= Aram Bagh, Karachi =

Aram Bagh آرام باغ
- Locality
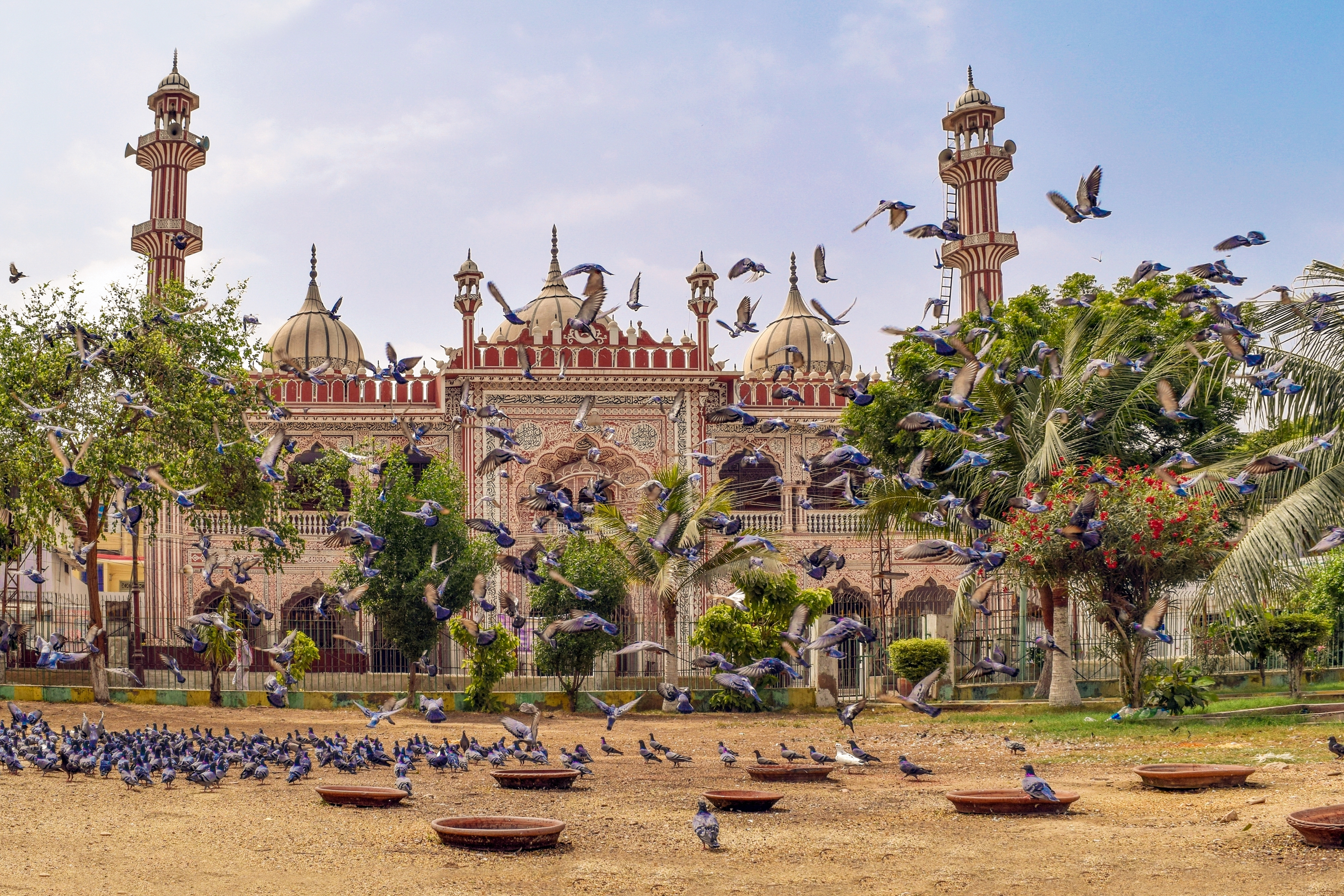
- Aram Bagh Mosque, built across from Aram Bagh Park by Muslim refugees from India following Partition
- Interactive map of Aram Bagh
- Coordinates: 24°51′22″N 67°0′48″E
- Country: Pakistan
- Province: Sindh
- City: Karachi

Government
  - Constituency: NA-247 (Karachi South-II)
  - National Assembly Member: Aftab Siddiqui (PTI)

Aram Bagh (Urdu: آرام باغ meaning Garden of relaxation), originally known as Ram Bagh (Urdu: رام باغ meaning Garden of Ram) is a neighborhood located in historic center of Karachi, Pakistan that was built around the Aram Bagh Park. Aram Bagh has a high concentration of listed and protected heritage buildings, with many in a good state of conservation.

== History ==
There has been an abundance of water in the Ram Bagh area of Karachi since ancient times and many wells were dug here to supply water to the residents that settled around it. According to Hindu belief, the Hindu avatars Ram, Sita and Lakshman stayed at this location on their way to Hinglaj pilgrimage after spending 14 years in a jungle. Since that time, Ram Bagh became a place of pilgrimage for Hindus. Arif Hasan claims Karachi was called Ramya in some Greek texts.

The British built an army cantonment in Ram Bagh area after they conquered Karachi from the Kalmati in 1839. The Ram Bagh Quarter had three water tanks, including a prominent one named the Rambagh Tank, which was 9 acres in size. The British named the entire locality as Ram Bagh after this water tank. Wells in Ram Bagh were used to supply the British Cantonment to the east. During the 1857 Mutiny against British rule, rebels were blasted by canons by the British forces in Ram Bagh.

In 1939, Deewan Jethanand built Ram Bagh -a park positioned near Swami Narayan temple, which is located on the nearby Burns Road. Ram Bagh was used for Hindu religious gatherings and celebrations, as well as political gatherings. The Ramlila story was enacted in Ram Bagh annually which lasted ten days.

During the partition of British India in 1947, some homes of the Hindu community in Ram Bagh were looted; during this time, thousands of Muslim refugees from India set up camps in Ram Bagh and it was renamed as Aram Bagh i.e. Garden of relaxation, to mark the end of their arduous journey to Pakistan. The area is still home to about 40 Hindu families, who report good relations with their Muslim neighbors.

== Religious sites ==
The Shiv Mandir is located in Aram Bagh and is open on Monday evenings. It was built by Astan Shrimati Hajeebai in memory of Ram Mangat Ram, her husband. Aram Bagh is also home to the Rameshwar Mahadev Mandir, built in the 1920s and still in use. In the past, Ram Bagh also contained the Ram Chandur Temple, among three other mandirs, each of which were "situated at the four corners of the Tank."

Aram Bagh Masjid, as well as the Shiv Mandir and Swami Narayan Mandir, are located in the Aram Bagh area. The Aram Bagh Masjid was built in Aram Bagh, atop the stage on which Ramlila performances occurred, by the Muslims refugees that settled around the Aram Bagh.

Aram Bagh is also home to a functioning Sikh temple, the Guru Nanak Satsang Sabha Gurdwara, built in 1935, which serves the small Sikh community of Aram Bagh as well as Nanakpanthi Hindus The Gurdwara had come under of Hindu residents until 2016, when the Pakistani Supreme Court ordered it to be handed back to the Sikh community.

== Heritage buildings ==
As per the Sindh Directorate of Antiquities:

=== Protected ===
- Shahab Mansion
- Wasim Mansion
- Rooman Building
- Sobhraj Chetumal Maternity House
- Sindh Wildlife Building
- Y. M. C. A. Building
- National Academy of Performing Art (Hindu Gymkhana)
- Aiwan-e-Saddar
- Muslim Gymkhana
- Old State Bank Building (Victoria Museum)
- D. J. Sindh Government Science College Extension
- NED University City Campus
- D. J College (Deyaram Jethmal College)
- Geetumal (Giddu Mall) Building
- Ather Mansion
- DMD Trust Building
- Dr. Khan Building
- Sarnagati Building
- P. K. Shahani Building
- Badruddin Building
- Sitakunj Building
- Salika Company
- Sevakunj Hostel
- Mendoza Building
- Raza Library Building/Kashif Manzil
- Lucky Chambers
- Manzoor Sons Building
- Jamila Nighat Maternity Home (Dhani Ram Sons)
- Hasan Manzil
- Log Ram Building
- Zainab Manzil
- Saify Electric Trading Co.
- Markaz-e-Ehl-e-Sunnat
- Shams Light House
- Sadik Manzil
- Yousuf Manzil
- Abu Bakar Siddique Manzil
- Haji Ibrahim Building
- Mollai (Bhagwani) Mansion
- Opal Building
- Talpur Building
- Gul Trading Company Building
- Coffee House (Wassumal) Building
- Sami Chambers
- Awan Lodge
- Sindh Zamindar Hotel
- Zubaida Mansion
- Dost Manzil
- Wadhumal Deumal Panchayat Trust Building
- J. M. B. Girls School (Sita Ram Building)
- Haridas Lalji Building
- Bhojraj Building
- Shikarpuri Mansion (Ceasor Building)
- Darul-Ishaat (Tayyab Ali) Building
- Hassan Ali (Lekhra) Building
- Bholchund Zehra Building
- Thakurdas Building (Zarina Manzil)
- Bhojaj Building
- Sheikha Building
- Ganga Ram Building
- Malkani Mansion
- Rehman Dental Clinic Building
- Azfar Mansion (Rehman Building)
- Thakurdas Building (Thakur Singh Building)
- Mukhi Wadhumal Building
- Government Veterinary Hospital (Richmond Crawford Dispensary)
- Dawakhana Hakim Ajmal Khan
- China Amersi Building
- Domed Structure at intersection of Rattan Street and Satsing Shivan Street
- Qadeer Brothers Building
- Hotel Home (Lahori) Building
- Mehmood Library (China Amersi)
- Silver House
- Rehmat Building
- Fatima Manzil
- Jahangir Game Company Building
- Saeeda Manzil

=== Unprotected ===
- Old Shahani Building
- Anubehar Building
- Premkunj Building
- Alfalah Manzil
- Naveen Mansion
- Haji Manzoor Building
- Afundi Manzil
- Karachi Mansion
- Ramkrishan/ Nawab Manzil
- Khan Mansion
- KB Noori Building
- Sugan Mansion
- Shams Manzil
- Saheli Mansion
- Jamnadas Building
- Moti Ram Building
- Madan Mohan Teckchand Building
- Mohandas Tekamdas Building
- Rais Manzil
- Wazir Ali Building
- Wazir Ashraf Building
- Darul Aman
- New Lekhraj
- Muhammad Ali Building
- Mama Parsi Building
- Bholchund Building
- Kalavati Nivass
- Ahmed Ali, Akber Ali Building
- Asnand Khatori Building
- Aziz Mehel
- Narayan Gopal Building
- Shakeel Mansion/Chaki Compound
- Government Boys Primary School
- Ramchandra Temple

== See also ==
- Jehangir Kothari Parade
- Bagh Ibne Qasim
- Mazar-e-Quaid
- Karachi Zoo
- List of parks and gardens in Pakistan
- List of parks and gardens in Lahore
- List of parks and gardens in Karachi
- PAF Museum Park
- Maritime Museum Park
- Hill Park
- Safari Park
- Jheel Park
- Bagh-e-Quaid-e-Azam
- Jinnah Bagh, Larkana
- Aziz Bhatti Park
- List of parks in Karachi
