= Bagh Ibne Qasim =

Beach park in Karachi, Pakistan

Bagh Ibn-e-Qasim
- باغ ابنِ قاسم
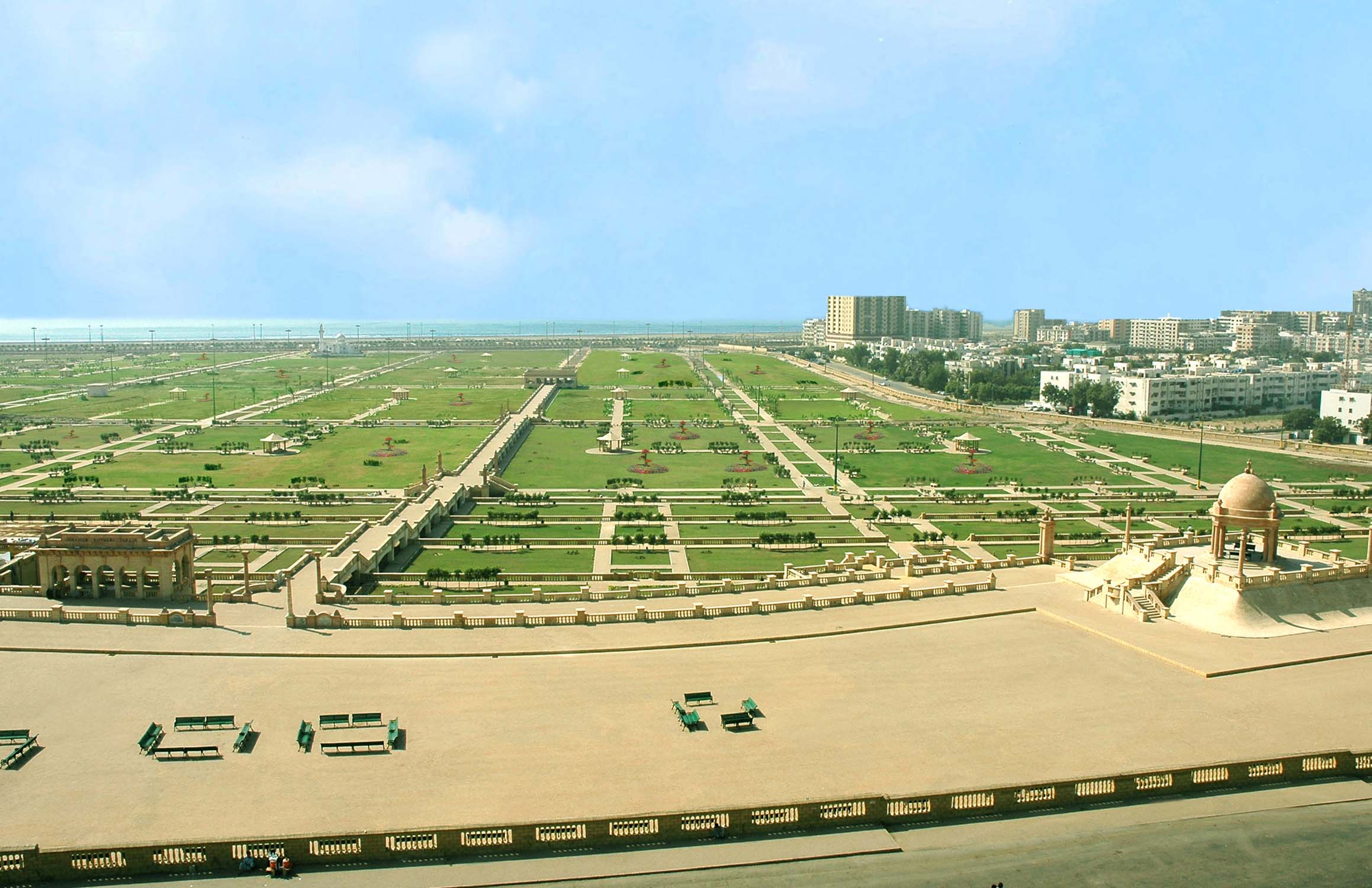
- A view over the park, with the Jehangir Kothari Parade visible on the left next to the Lady Lloyd Pier, and the Katrak Bandstand on the right
- Interactive map of Bagh Ibn-e-Qasim
- Type: Urban park
- Location: Clifton, Karachi, Pakistan
- Coordinates: 24.8099°N 67.0251°E
- Area: 16 ha
- Opened: February 27, 2007; 19 years ago
- Etymology: Named after the 8th century Arab conqueror, Muhammad Bin Qasim of the Umayyad empire
- Administrator: Karachi Metropolitan Corporation

Bagh Ibne Qasim (Urdu: باغ ابنِ قاسم; lit. 'Garden of the Son of Qasim', in reference to Muhammad bin Qasim) is a 53-hectare (130-acre) beachside park in Karachi, Pakistan. It is one the largest urban park in Karachi which was inaugurated in 2007 on the site of the former Toyland Theme Park near Clifton Beach. Named in honor of the 8th-century conqueror Muhammad Bin Qasim, the park is spread across a substantial 53 hectares of land and feature historic structures such as the Jehangir Kothari Parade and Katrak Bandstand.

== Location ==
The park is located near the Clifton Beach, Karachi and is Karachi's largest urban park, covering 0.53 square kilometres (130 acres). The northern edge begins at Jehangir Kothari Parade, and ends near the coast of the Arabian Sea. It encompasses the Jehangir Kothari Parade, built in 1919, as well as the Katrak Bandstand. The Lady Lloyd Pier, built in 1921, stretched from what is today Shahrah-e-Firdousi to the waterline of the shore through what is today the park. Two historic fountains are situated within the park, the Pirojbai Hormusji Khajurina Fountain from 1936, and the Motumal Shewaram Setpal Fountain, also from 1936.

== History ==
The park encompasses what was previously known as the Rupchand Bilaram Park, which was almost 160 ha (400 acres) in size. In 1964, the park's size was reduced to 53 ha (132 acres) after the Karachi Municipal Corporation leased out land for development. In 1966, the Karachi Development Authority assumed control of the park, and in 1974, renovated several structures in the park. A sea wall to the east was made at this time, which lead to the coastline retreating further from the southern edge of the park. The Jehangir Kothari Parade, Katrak Bandstand, Lady Lloyd Pier, and the 2 fountains were protected in 1994 by the Sindh Cultural Heritage Preservation Act. In the years afterwards the area fell into gradual decay as successive governments neglected to maintain the site. By 2001, the park was barren and considered a "virtual wasteland."

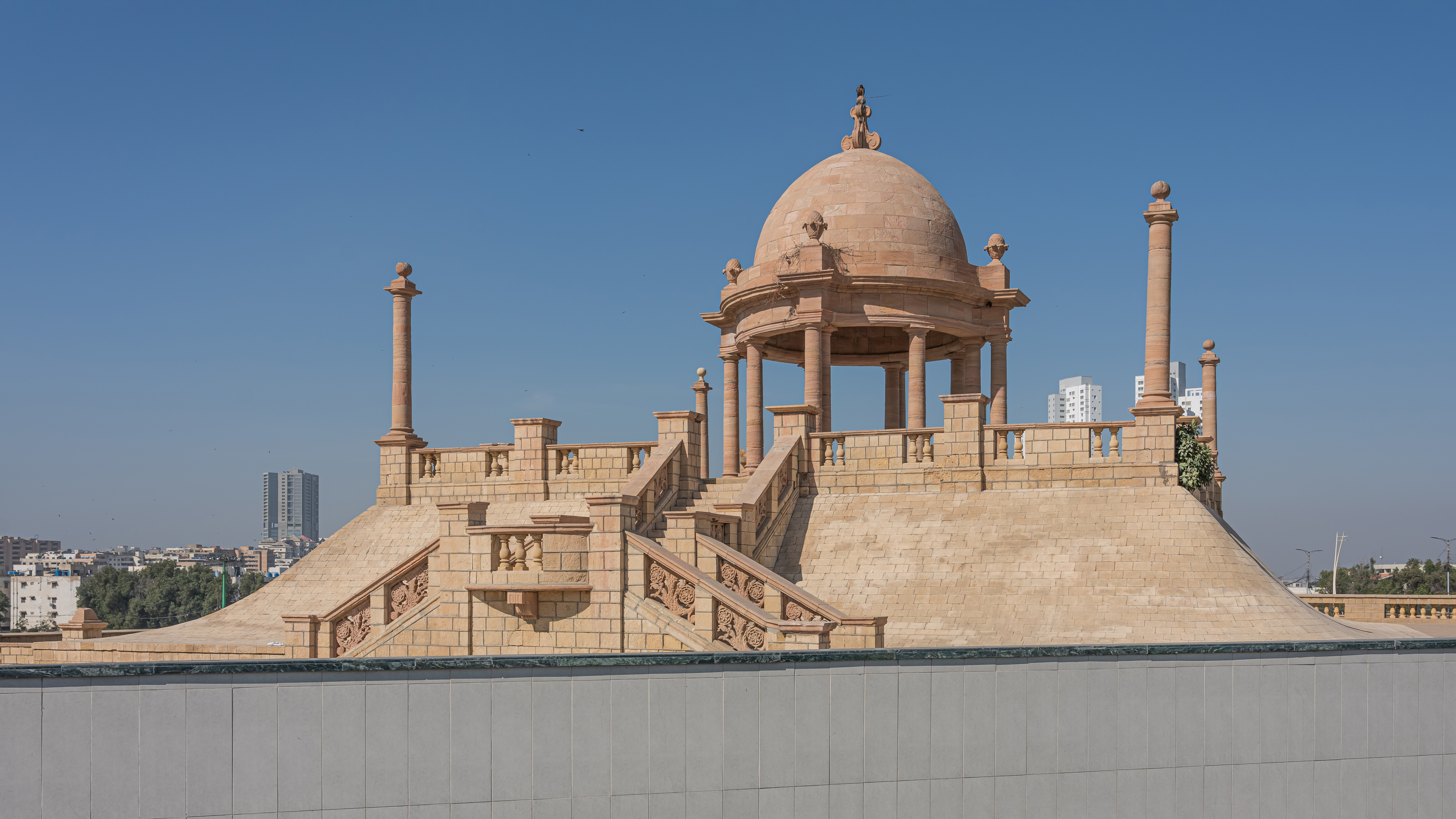
Katrak Bandstand was built in 1920, and is now at the northern edge of the park

Construction on the new park began on 22 July 2005. The park was ceremonially opened by then President Pervez Musharraf on 27 February 2007 at a cost of PKR 600 million, and renamed after the 8th century Arab conqueror, Muhammad Bin Qasim of the Umayyad empire. The park quickly gained popularity and became a venue for different events. By 2015, the park again began to fall into decay due to lack of maintenance. A large three-level intersection on Shahrah-e-Firdousi, as well as the allegedly illegal seizing of land for the 62-floor Bahria Icon Tower further deteriorated the park's environment.

In April 2017, the park again was renovated by the Karachi Metropolitan Corporation, and the park was re-opened by Prime Minister Imran Khan on 30 March 2019. In October 2019, the park hosted the opening of the Karachi Biennale.

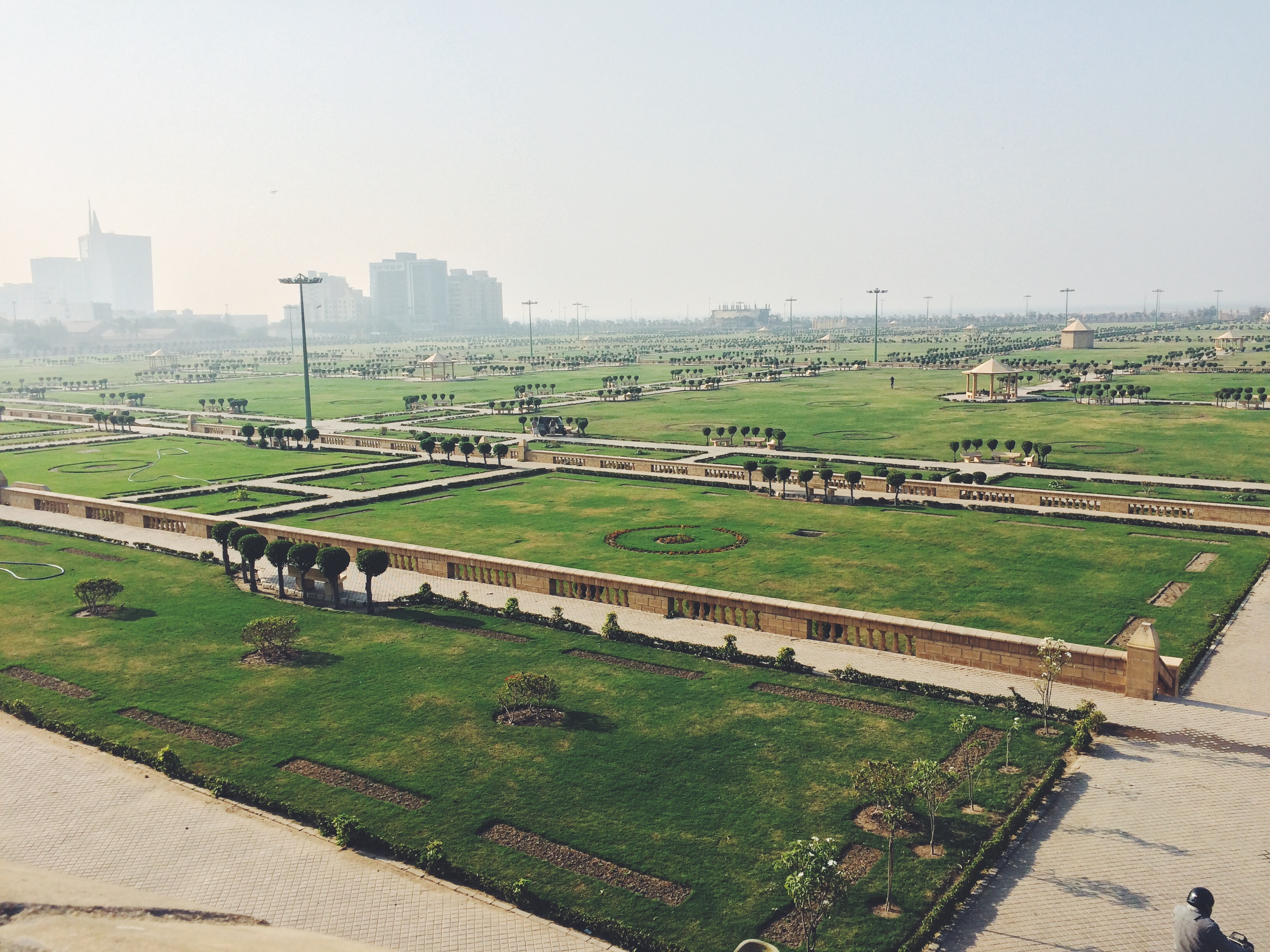
Bagh ibn Qasim

== Features ==
The park is spread over 53 ha (130 acres) near the Arabian Sea coast. The northern edge of the park includes the 1919 Jehangir Kothari Parade, the Katrak Bandstand, and former Karachi Aquarium. The 1921 Lady Lloyd Pier begins at the northern edge of the park near the Jehangir Kothari Parade, and extends 180 m (600 ft) into the park.

The park also has a turtle pond, murals of dinosaurs, 24 washrooms, a mosque, 20 stone canopies and a large rose garden. It overlooks the 90 m (300 ft) Port Fountain of Karachi Port Trust (KPT).

== Significance ==
Many large public gatherings and events are frequently held here due to its huge size of park grounds, for example the centennial celebrations for the renowned Pakistani poet Faiz Ahmad Faiz in November 2011. Events that have taken place in the park include the Sindh Festival 2014.

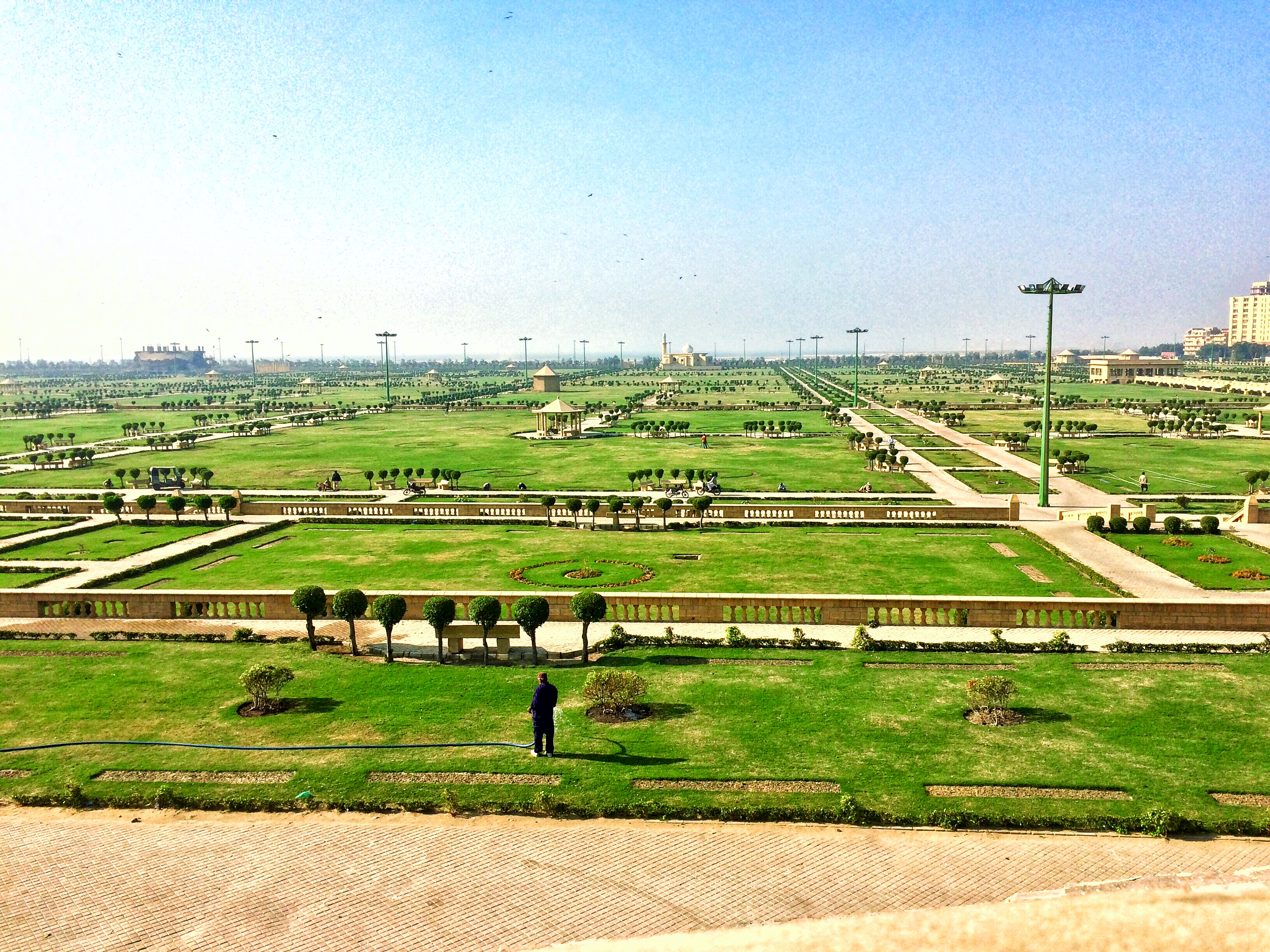
Ibn Qasim Park

== Gallery ==
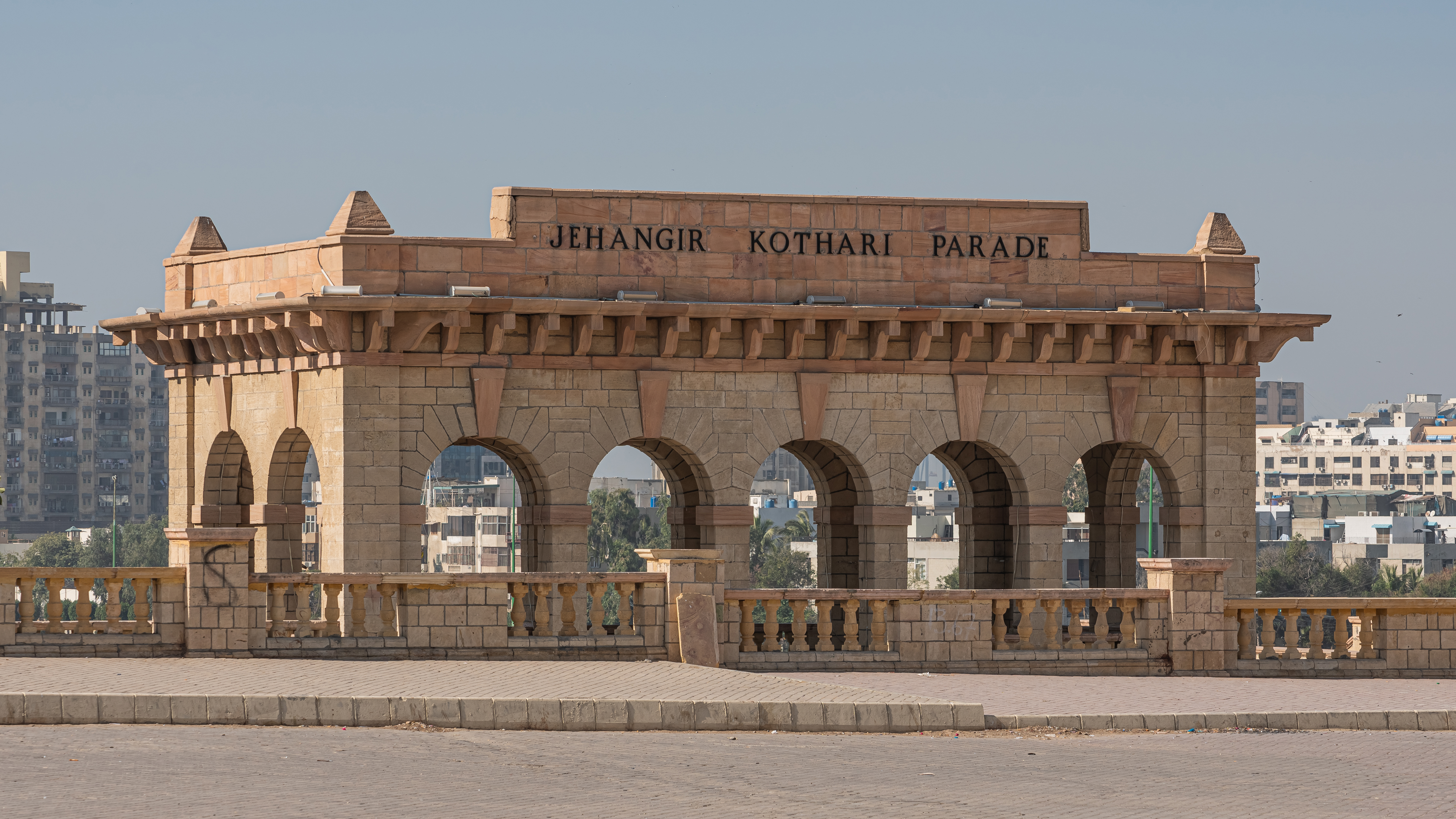
The Jehangir Kothari Parade at the northern edge of the park

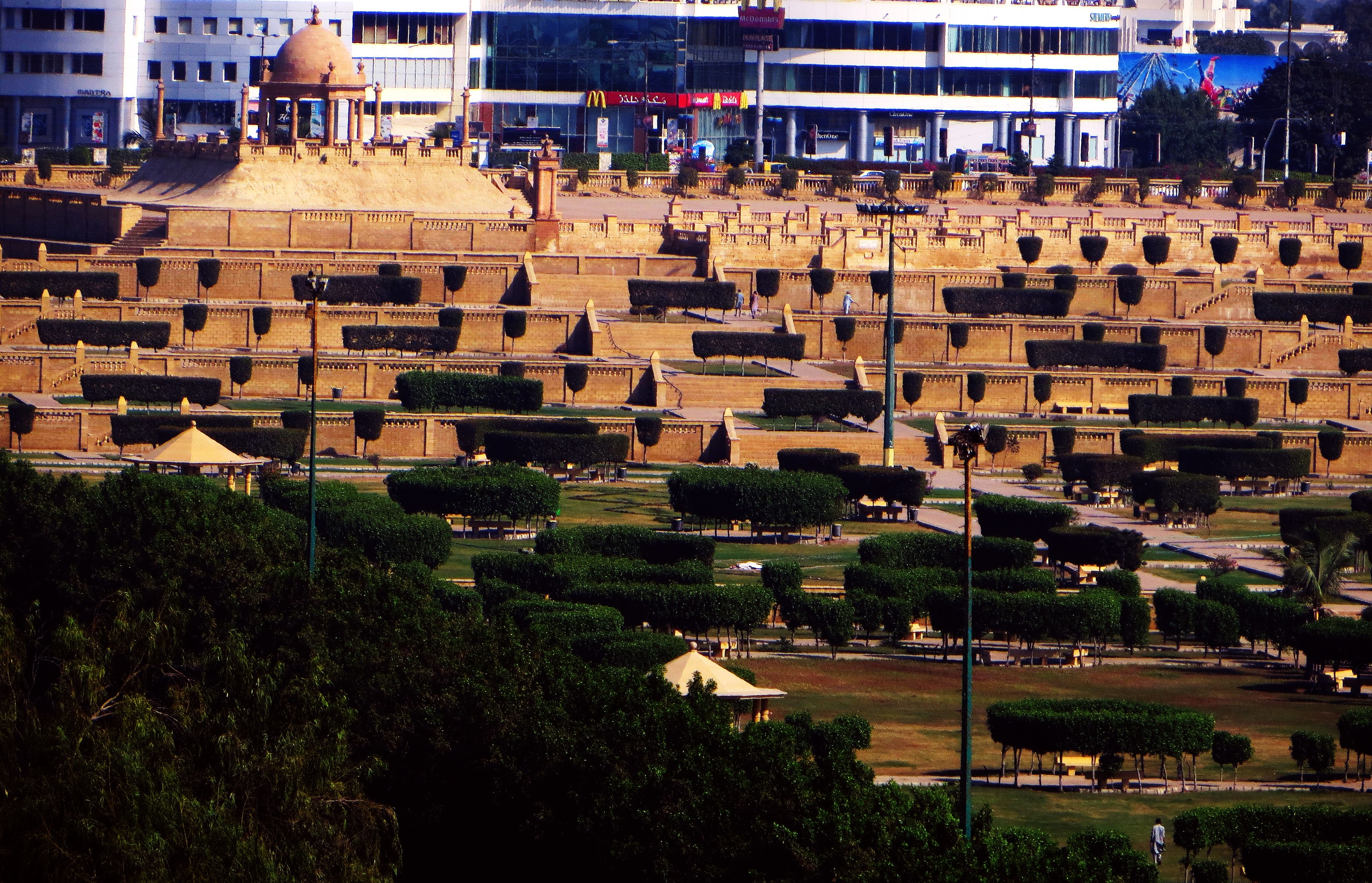
View of the Katrak Bandstand

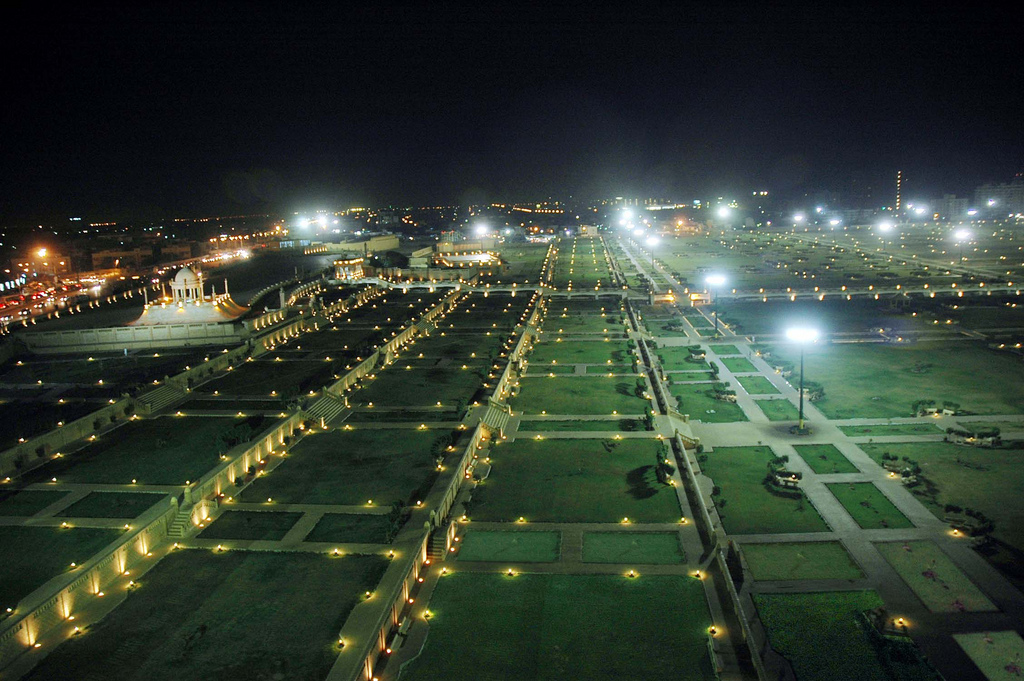
Aerial night-time view of the park

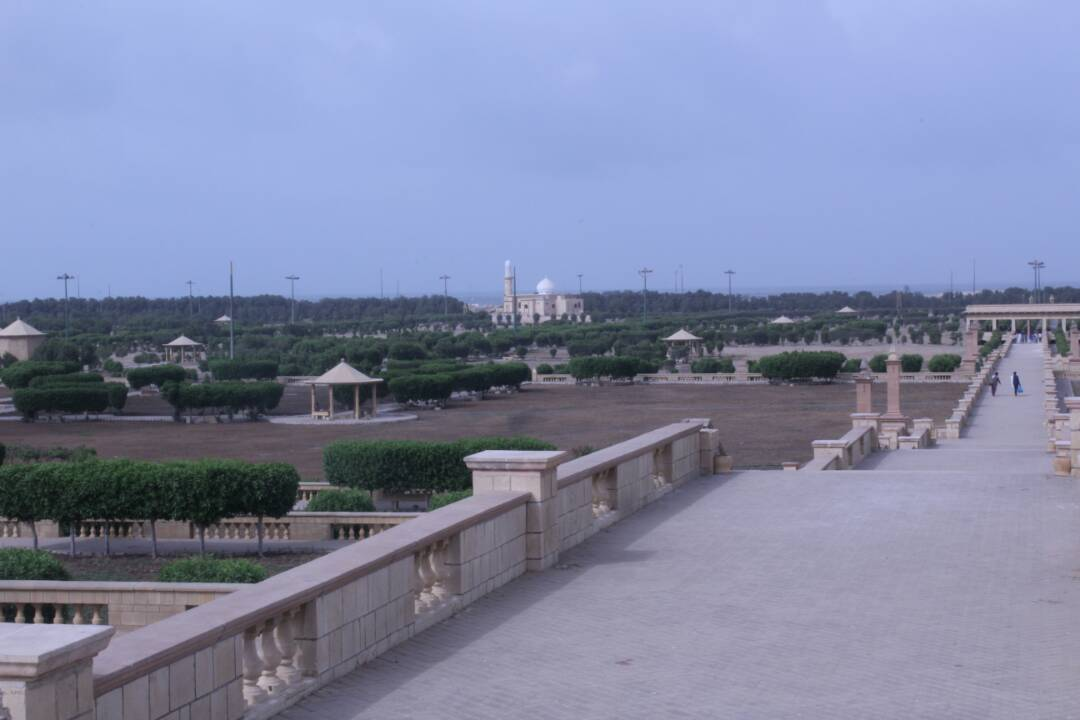
The Lady Lloyd Pier, built in 1921, runs through much of the park

== See also ==
- Muhammad bin Qasim
- Jehangir Kothari Parade
- Mazar-e-Quaid
- Karachi Zoo
- List of parks and gardens in Pakistan
- List of parks and gardens in Lahore
- List of parks and gardens in Karachi
- PAF Museum Park
- Maritime Museum Park
- Hill Park
- Safari Park
- Jheel Park
- Bagh-e-Quaid-e-Azam
- Aziz Bhatti Park
- Aram Bagh
- List of parks in Karachi
