= List of parks and gardens in Karachi =

The following is a list of parks and gardens in Karachi, Sindh, Pakistan. Many of them are maintained by the Karachi Metropolitan Corporation.

== Public parks ==
- 5B Park (Phool Bagh), North Nazimabad Town
- Afza Altaf Park
- Agha Khan Park
- Allah Rakha Park
- Aladin Park
- Amina Park
- Amir Khusro, Clifton Cantonment
- Anu Bhai Park
- Aram Bagh Saddar Town
- Askari Amusement Park Gulshan-e-Iqbal Town
- Aunty Park, Clifton Cantonment
- Aziz Bhatti Park Gulshan-e-Iqbal Town
- Baara Dari Park, North Nazimabad Town
- Babul Islam Play Ground New Karachi Town
- Bagh Ibne Qasim Clifton Cantonment
- Baloch Park Saddar Town
- Baradari Old Polo Ground
- Bedhwar Library, Park Jamshed Town
- Beach Park, Clifton Cantonment
- Boat Basin Park, Clifton Cantonment
- Botanical Garden, Gulshan-e-Iqbal Town
- Bukhari Shah Park Kharadar
- Cantonment Park Malir Cantonment
- Central Park, Taiser Town
- Central Park, Sector T, Gulshan-e-Maymar, Taiser Town
- Chandni Chowk Park
- Chhatree (Umbrella) Park, Taiser Town
- Corniche Park Clifton Cantonment
- Dehli Park, Lyari Town
- Dolphin Beach Park, Clifton Cantonment
- F Block Playground, North Nazimabad Town
- Fatima Zehra Park
- Gabol Park, Lyari Town
- Go Aish, Gulshan-e-Iqbal Town
- Hasa Singh Park, Jamshed Town
- Hasrat Mohani Model Park
- Hill Park, Jamshed Town
- Ibn-e-Insha Park, North Nazimabad Town
- Jahangir ParkSaddar Town
- Jam 11, Football Ground, Malir Town
- Jama Masjid Park, Lyari Town
- Jamaluddin Afghani Park
- Johar Park
- Kamal Park Gulshan-e-Iqbal Town
- Kashmir Park, Jamshed Town
- Kernal Park, Jamshed Town
- Khayyal Das ParkSaddar Town
- Khori Garden, Lyari Town
- Khaja Nazimuddin Family Park
- Khatoon Park, Orangi Town
- Kidney Hill Park, Gulshan Town
- Kite Park
- Kutchi Memon Park
- Lala Gul Park 11/A, New Karachi Town
- Liaquat Park
- Lucknow Chhota Park Korangi Town
- Lucknow Bara Park, Korangi Town
- Maulana Mohammad Ali Jauhar Park
- Metroville SITE Town Park, Orangi Town
- Mir Usman Park, Lyari Town
- Mohammadi Park
- Moulvi Usman Park, Lyari Town
- Mudassir Park Gulshan-e-Iqbal Town
- Mujahid Shaheed Model Park Korangi Town
- Naveen Bhai Ground Lyari Town
- New International Stadium, Baldia Town
- Nisar Shaheed Park, Clifton Cantonment
- Nishtar Park Jamshed Town
- Park, Taiser Town
- Park Orangi Town, Orangi Town
- Parsi Colony Park Jamshed Town
- Partab Singh Park, Saddar Town
- Playground 5A/3 New Karachi Town
- Professor Rafiq Chohan Park, Saddar Town
- Sabri Park
- Sohrab Katrak Park Jamshed Town
- The Forum Clifton Cantonment Board ParkClifton Cantonment
- Tikon Park Clifton Cantonment
- Usmania Family Park Gulshan-e-Iqbal Town
- Zamzama Park, Clifton Cantonment
- Alakhwan Park, New Karachi Town
- Quaid e Azam park, steel town

== National parks ==
- National Park SITE Town
- Kirthar National Park

== Private parks ==
- Dreamworld Resort, Super Highway
- Jaan Farmhouse
- Jabees Playland, Clifton
- Shamsi farmhouse Malir Cantonment
- Sindbad, Rashid Minhas Road

== Gardens ==
- Bagh Ibne Qasim
- Bagh-e-Jinnah, Karachi
- Jheel Park, Jamshed Town
- Karachi Zoological Gardens, Garden Road
- Safari Park Gulshan-e-Iqbal Town
- Talimi Bagh

== Playgrounds ==
- CAA Club Jogging Track Faisal Cantonment
- Al Jafar Playground
- Bangalore Town Ground Gulshan-e-Iqbal Town
- F Block Playground North Nazimabad Town
- Fateh Bagh North Nazimabad Town
- Jinnah Ground Gulberg Town
- KGA Grounds Jamshed Town
- Karachi Parsi Institute Jamshed Town
- Khajji Ground
- Kokan Ground Gulshan-e-Iqbal Town
- Pakistan Association for Deaf (pad) Ground
- Railway Ground
- National Bank of Pakistan Sports Complex
- Shaheen Ground
- Sharfabad Cricket Ground Gulshan-e-Iqbal Town
- Yousuf Suleman Mulai Ground Gulshan-e-Iqbal Town
- Zahid Ground Gulbarg Town
- Goal football/cricket ground model colony

== Golf and Country clubs ==
- Acacia Country and Golf Club Faisal Cantonment
- Defence Authority Country and Golf Club Clifton Cantonment
- Karachi Golf Club Faisal Cantonment
- Gulmohar Golf Club Malir Cantonment
- Arabian Sea Country Club Bin Qasim Town

== See also ==
- List of parks and gardens in Pakistan
- List of parks and gardens in Lahore
- List of urban parks by size
