= Bagh-e-Karachi =

Public Park in Karachi, Pakistan

Aladin Park
- علادین پارک
- Type: Public park
- Location: Karachi, Pakistan
- Area: 29 ha
- Opened: 12 July 2026
- Administrator: City of Karachi

Aladin Park (Urdu: علادین پارک), is a public park currently under in Karachi, Pakistan.

== History ==
Aladin Park was originally part of the Karachi Safari Park, which was done as a public park. However, in 1995, it was converted into the Aladdin Amusement Park, which also housed the Aladdin Shopping Mall and the Pavilion. After the demolition, the area was cleared and returned to its original purpose as a public park on Aladin Park now new openly.

== Development ==
In the initial phase of construction, 5653 trees were planted in the park. The park is being envisioned as a family park with several recreational amenities, including swings.

=== New City Council building ===
Apart from the park, a new building for the Karachi Metropolitan Corporation (KMC) City Council with a capacity of 600 to 800 seats is also being constructed on the grounds.

== See also ==
- Bagh-e-Jinnah
- List of parks and gardens in Karachi
- List of parks and gardens in Pakistan
