= Khaadi =

Pakistani fashion and lifestyle brand

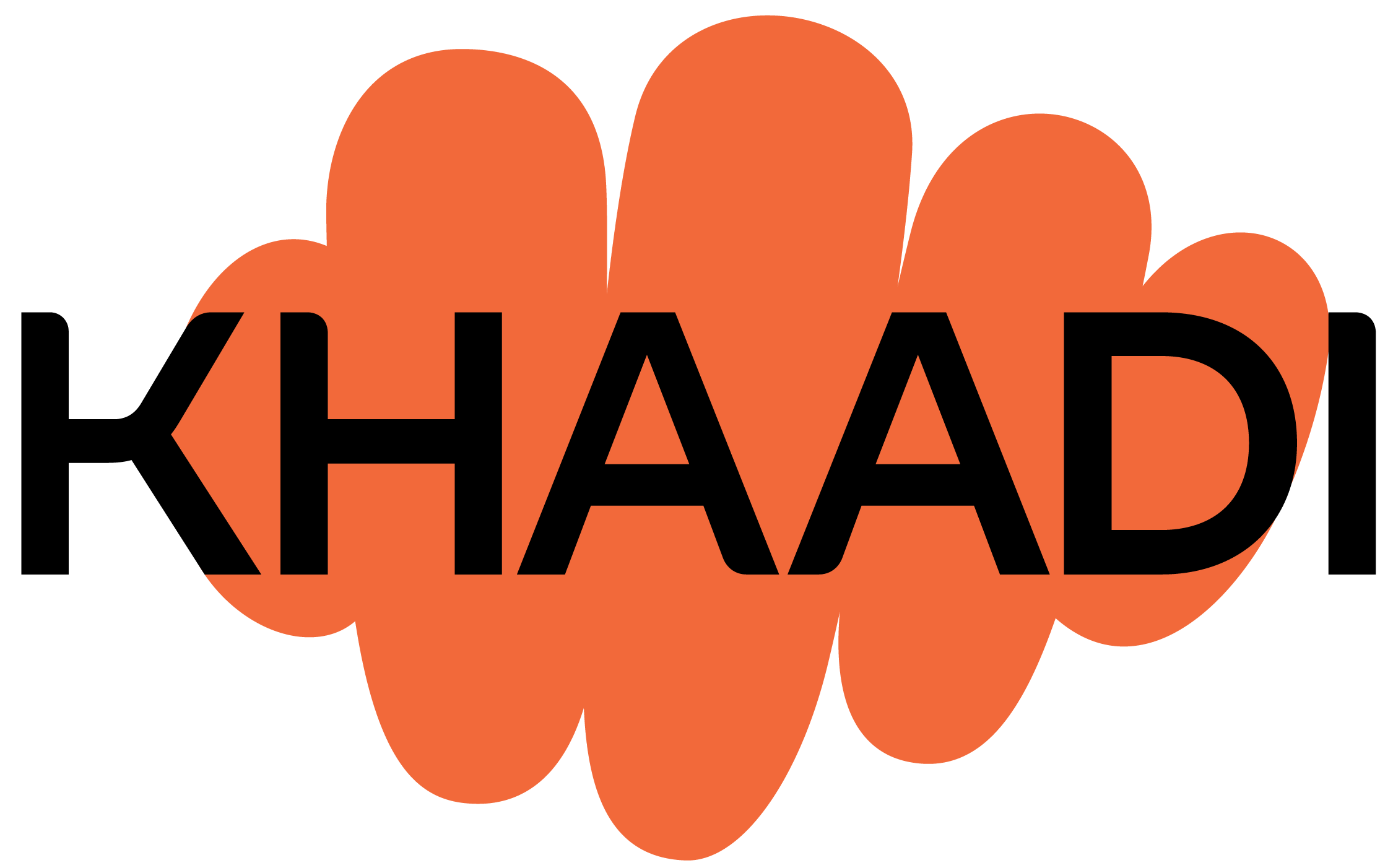

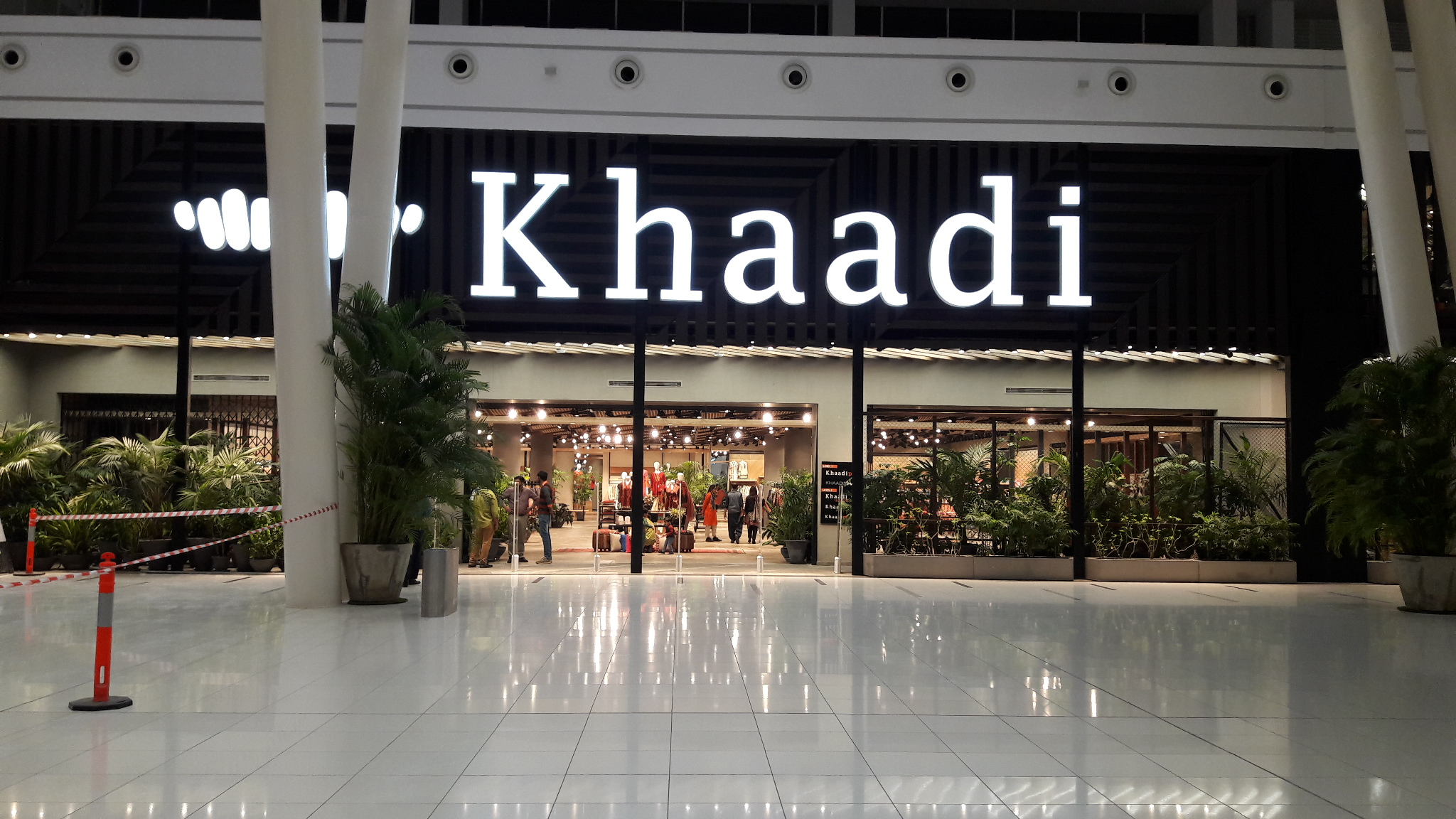
- Trade name: Khaadi
- Type: Private
- Industry: Retail
- Genre: Clothing
- Founded: 13 December 1998 (27 years ago)
- Founder: Shamoon Sultan
- Headquarters: Pakistan
- Number of locations: 41 stores
- Area served: Asia, Europe, Australia, America, Northern America and Middle East
- Products: Textiles, Apparel
- Website: www.khaadi.com

Khaadi (Urdu: کھادی, pronounced [kʰaːd̪iː]) is a Pakistani fashion and lifestyle brand founded in December 1998. Its headquarters are located in Karachi. As of 2026, it operates over forty stores in seventeen cities across Pakistan and nine stores across the United Kingdom, the United States, Canada, and the Arab States of the Gulf.

== History ==
=== Founding and early growth ===
Khaadi was founded in 1998 by Shamoon Sultan, and the first store opened in Zamzama, Karachi, in 1999. Khaadi was originally a hand-woven clothing brand. It then expanded to multiple stores within two years of its inception and introduced several product lines.

By 2002, Khaadi had expanded its product line to include women's ready-to-wear items, and it later entered women's luxury wear with Khaadi Khaas in 2008.

=== International expansion ===
Khaadi began its international expansion in 2010, with its first store in Dubai, followed by its entry into the United Kingdom in 2013. It subsequently established stores across major cities in the UK including London, Birmingham, Bradford and Manchester, alongside locations in the UAE. In 2024, Khaadi began to make its mark in the United States, opening its first store in Tysons, Virginia, followed by experience stores in Houston and New Jersey.

=== Diversification and fast fashion ===
Khaadi expanded beyond its original handwoven fabric offering as it developed into a fashion and lifestyle retailer. In 2002, it introduced Ready To Wear, followed by Khaadi Khaas, its high-end fashion line, in 2008. The brand transitioned into fast fashion with the launch of Fabrics in 2012, followed by Khaadi Home in 2013. Accessories were introduced in 2016 and Fragrances in 2019, further broadening Khaadi’s product offering and establishing it as a complete fashion and lifestyle brand.

=== Labour practices ===
In May 2017, workers at Khaadi began nationwide protests following the dismissal of thirty-two workers for attempting to enforce their rights under Pakistani labour law, demanding an end to mistreatment in the garment sector, including long working hours, payment below minimum wage, and hazardous working conditions.

=== Rebranding and recent expansion ===
In 2020, Khaadi enlisted the assistance of Landor and Fitch in designing The Experience Hub, a 2,972 m^{2} (31,990 sq ft). space in Karachi that opened in December 2021 and functions as a retail space with its own café.

In 2024, Khaadi expanded its operations in the United States with a 5,500 sq ft (510 m^{2}) "Experience Store" at Tysons Corner Center in Virginia.

== Brand identity ==
The word Khaadi is derived from khaddi (Urdu: کھادی), meaning handloom. The fingers in the original logo signified the weavers' hands and the work that goes into the final product.

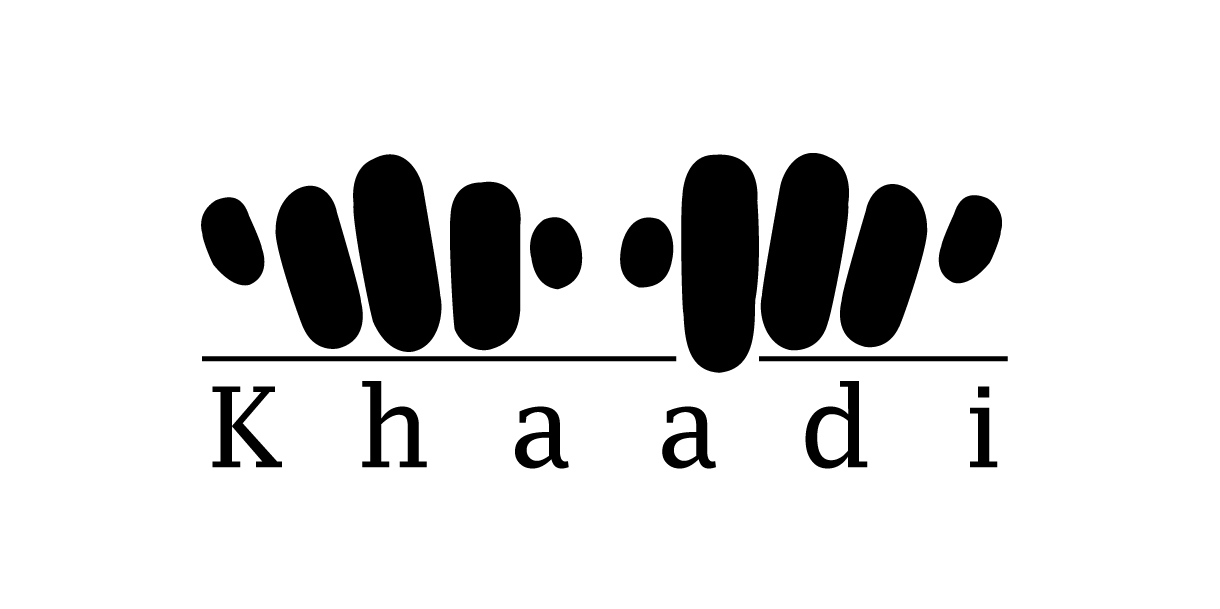
1999

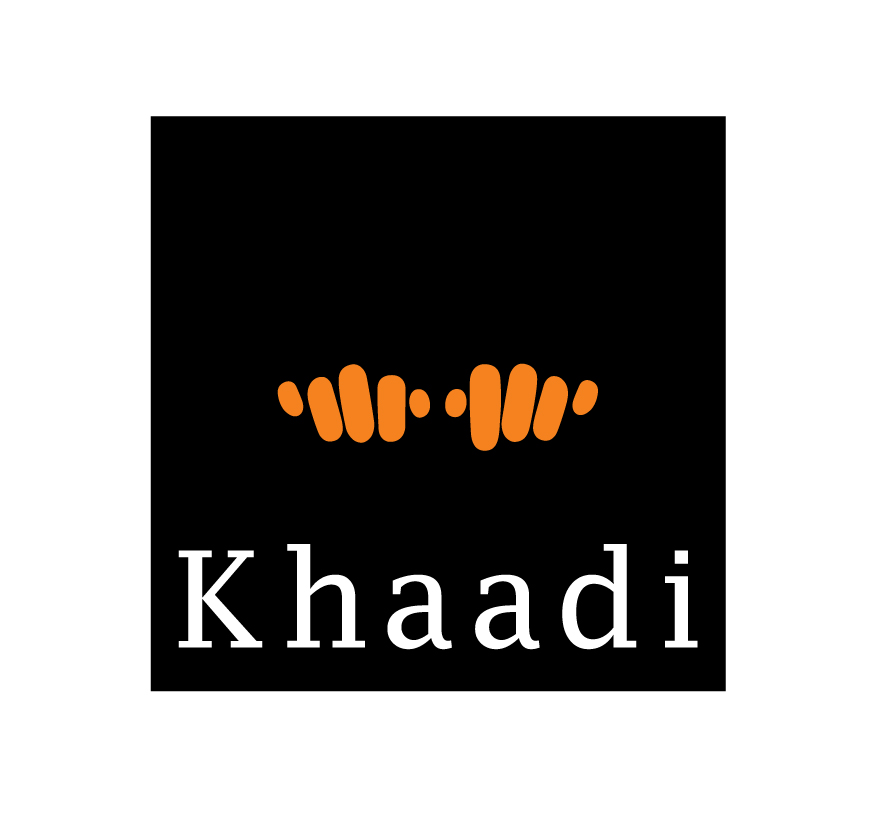
2010

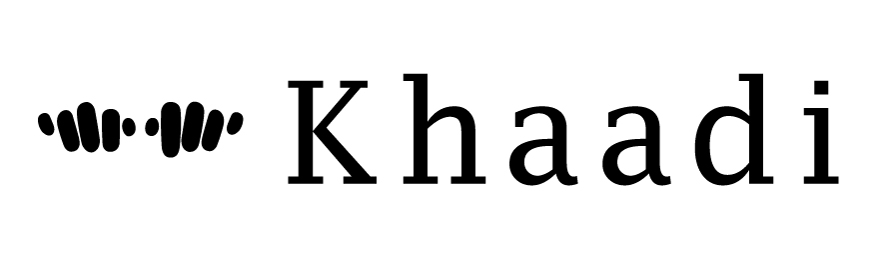
2013

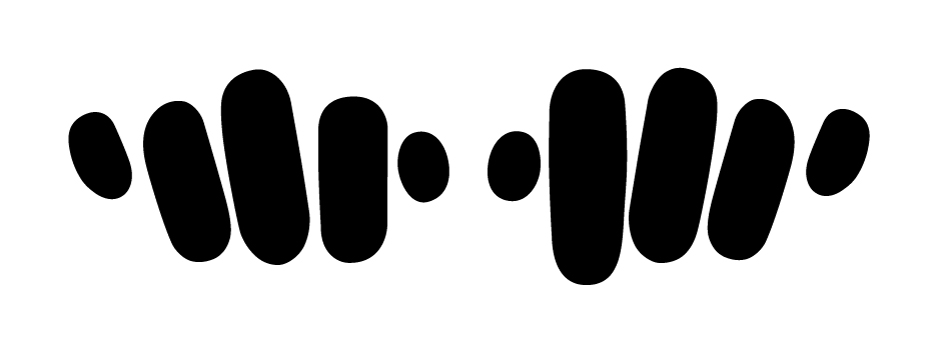
2018

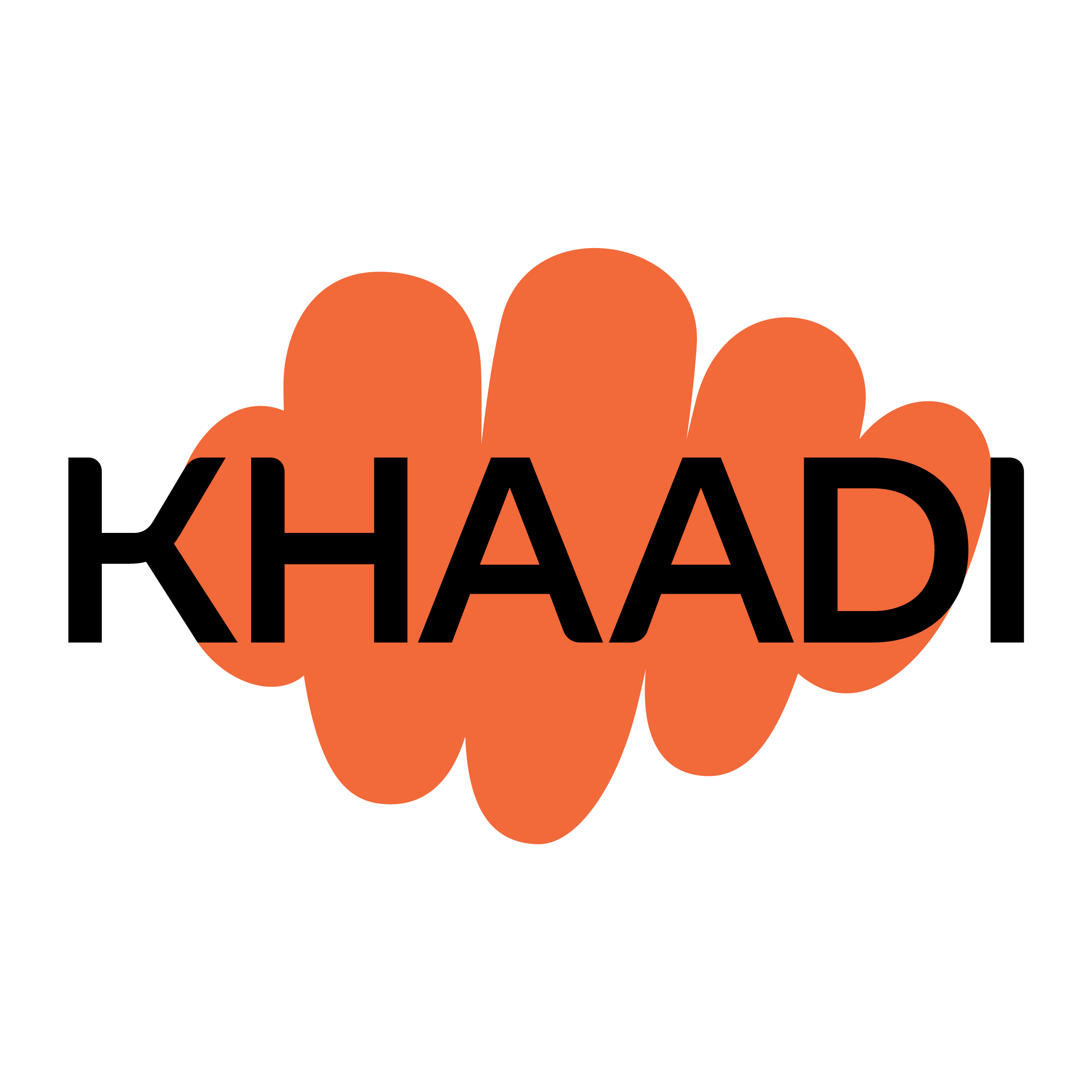
2021–present
