= Clifton Cantonment =

- Cantonment
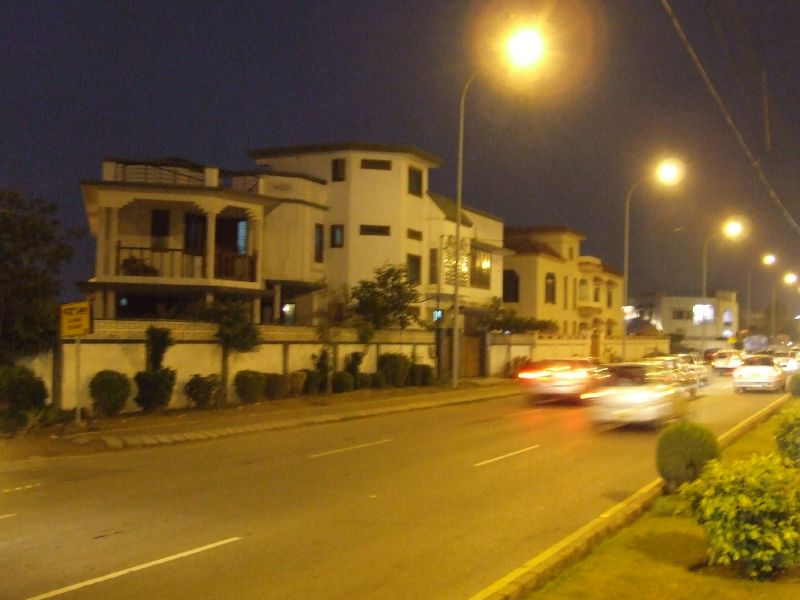
- Defence, Clifton Cantonment
- Interactive map of Clifton Cantonment
- Coordinates: 24.803896°N 67.063106°E
- Country: Pakistan
- Province: Sindh
- City District: Karachi
- Established: 9 August 1980

Government
  - Body: Cantonment Board Clifton
  - Chief Executive Officer: Muhammad Saleem Hassan Wattoo

Population (1998)
  - Total: 225,000
- Postal code: 75600
- Website: cbc.gov.pk

The Clifton Cantonment (Urdu: کلفٹن چھاؤنی) is a cantonment town within the city of Karachi, Sindh, Pakistan.

It serves as a military base and residential establishment. It was established by the British Indian Army during 19th century British India, and was taken over by the Pakistan Army in 1947. The cantonment maintains its own infrastructure of water supply and electricity, and is outside of the jurisdiction of the Karachi Metropolitan Corporation. Cantonment Board Clifton provides municipal services.

== Neighbourhoods ==
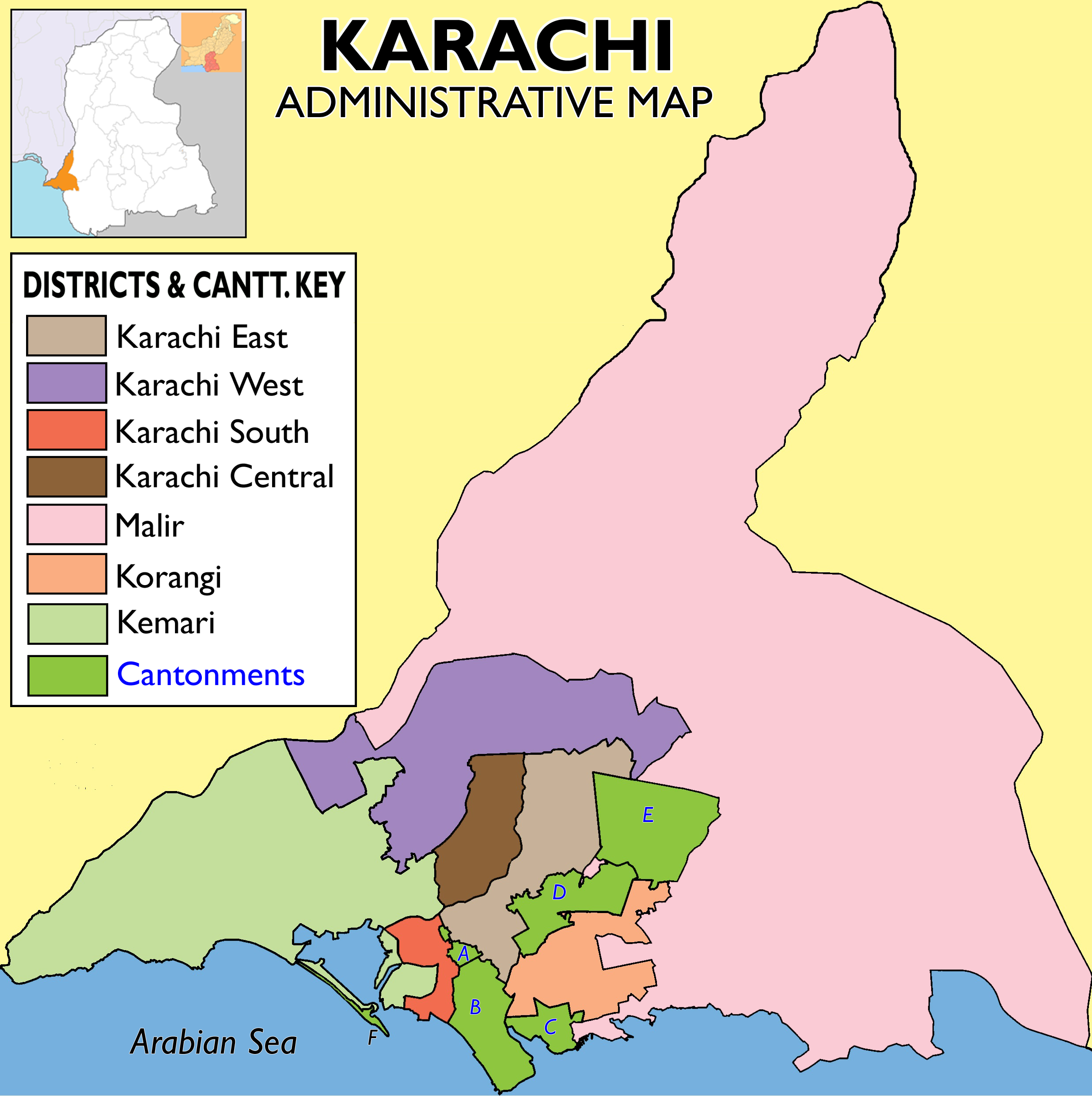
Location of Clifton Cantt. marked 'B' in the administrative map of Karachi.

- PNT Colony (Samieya Town)
- Bukhshan Village
- Chandio Village
- Chaudhry Khaliquz Zaman Colony
- Clifton (Karachi)
- Clifton Block-7
- Clifton Block-8
- Clifton Block-9
- DHA, Karachi or (Defence Housing Authority, Karachi)
- DHA City, Karachi
- DHA Suffa University
- DHA Phase I
- DHA Phase II
- DHA Phase III
- DHA Phase IV
- DHA Phase V
- DHA Phase VI
- DHA Phase VII
- Delhi Colony
- Gizri Creek
- Gizri
- Madinabad
- Pak Jamhuria Colony
- Punjab Colony

== Important roads ==
- Korangi Road
- Sunset Boulevard
- Khayaban-e-Jami
- Khayaban-e-Ittehad
- Khayaban-e-Bahria
- Khayaban-e-Badban
- Khayaban-e-Hilal
- Khayaban-e-Shahbaz
- Khayaban-e-Sehar
- Khayaban-e-Rahat
- Khayaban-e-Muhafiz
- Khayaban-e-Bukhari
- Khayaban-e-Nishat
- Commercial Avenue
- Khayaban-e-Hafiz
- Khayaban-e-Muslim
- Khayaban-e-Shaheen
- Khayaban-e-Shujaat
- 26th Street
- Saba Avenue
- Beach Avenue
- Khayaban-e-Mujahid
- Khayaban-e-Janbaz
- Khayaban-e-Shamsheer
- Khayaban-e-Tanzeem
- Khayaban-e-Tauheed
- Khayabane-e-Amir Khusro
- Khayaban-e-Tariq
- Khaliq-uz-Zaman
- Gizri Road

== See also ==
- Army Cantonment Board
