= Jehangir Kothari Parade =

Promenade in Karachi, Pakistan

Coordinates: 24.8136°N 67.0258°E

- Pakistan
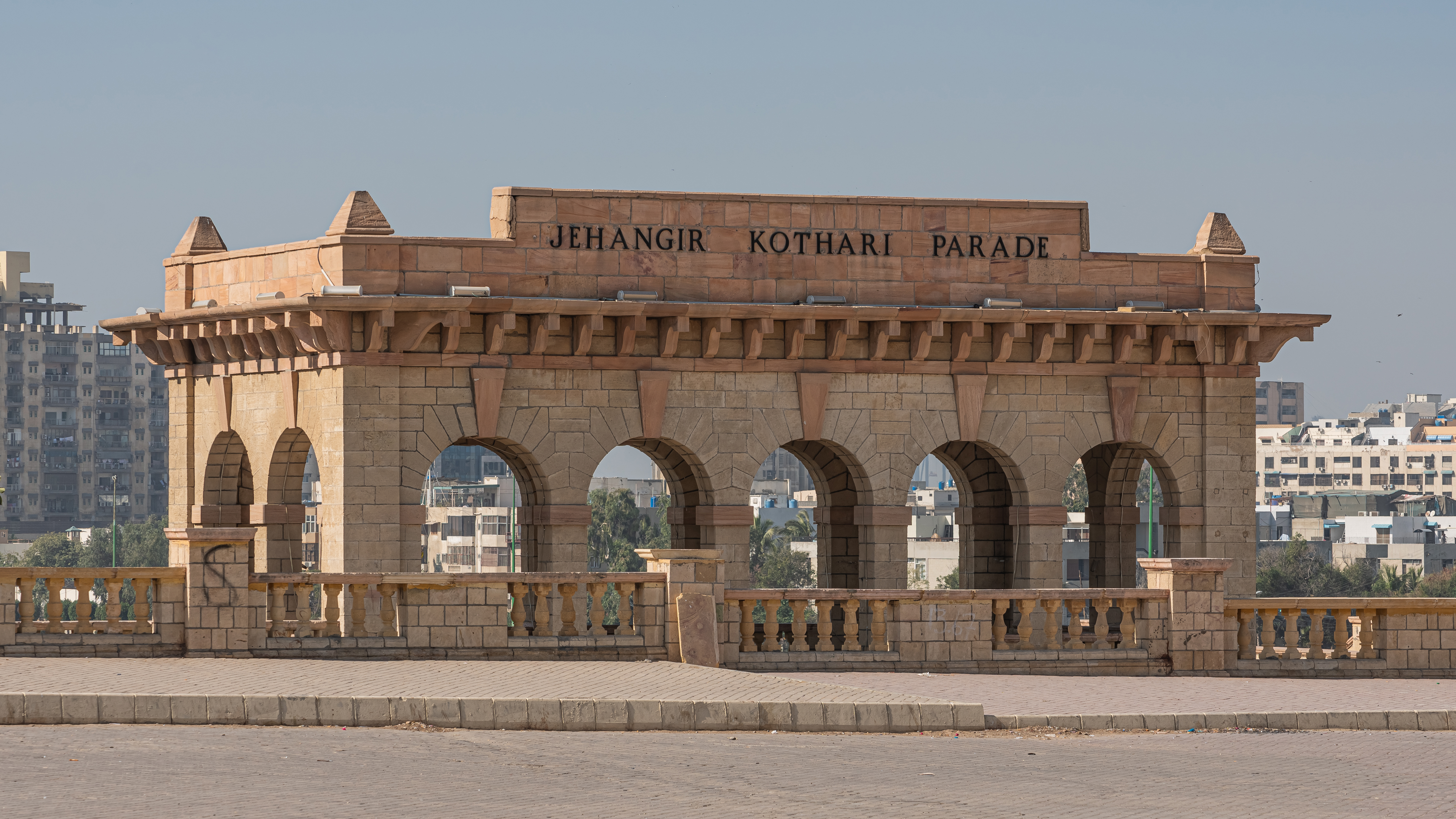
- Jehangir Kothari Parade and Pavilion
- Used for those deceased 10 February 1919 -
- Established: 5 January 1920.

Jehangir Kothari Parade (Urdu: جهانگیر کوٹهاری پریڈ) is a promenade in Karachi, Pakistan, built on land donated by Parsi businessman and philanthropist Jehangir Hormasji Kothari to the city of Karachi in 1919.

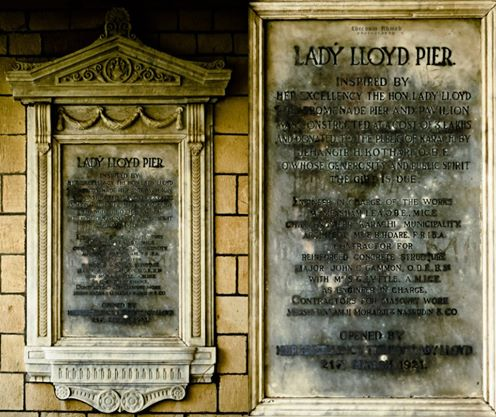
Lady Lloyd pier plaque

It is situated on a hilltop on the Arabian Sea, in the Clifton Beach area of Karachi. Jehangir Kothari was built in 1919 and opened to Karachi public in 1920. There are two structures in the complex: the Promenade Pavilion and Lady Lloyd Pier (an elevated sandstone public walkway) which is named after Lady Lloyd, wife of then Governor of Bombay Sir George Lloyd. This is evident in the marble plaque embedded in the pier wall that reads, "Lady Lloyd Pier".

== Construction ==
Inspired by Lady Lloyd, this promenade pier and pavilion was constructed at a cost of approximately British-Indian Rupees 300,000, and was donated to the people of Karachi by Jahangir Hormusji Kothari. Sandstone was used to construct it from the nearby village Gizri. The pavilion structure was inaugurated by Lady Lloyd on 5 January 1920 while the pier was inaugurated on 21 March 1921.

== Renovation ==
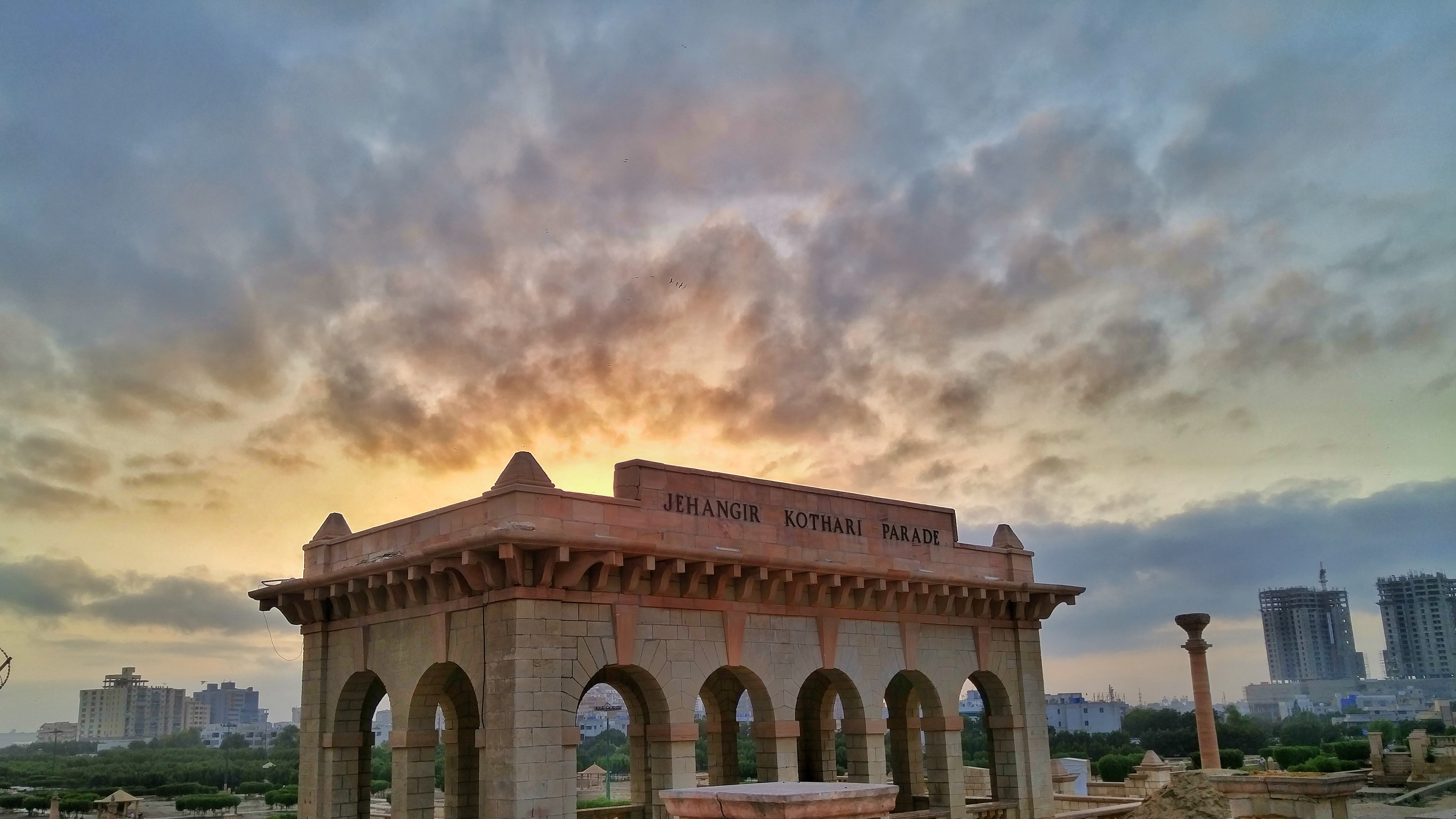
Jehangir Kothari Parade

In June 2005, City District Government Karachi extensive renovation work of the promenade pier and pavilion. The project covered the surrounding large area on both sides of Lady Lloyd Pier and after some delays, the project was finally inaugurated on 27 February 2007 by then President of Pakistan Pervez Musharraf. The finished project became Pakistan's largest park, Bagh Ibne Qasim. It was constructed on 52.6 ha (130 acres) of land around the pier and the newly formed park was named Bagh Ibne Qasim in memory of the 8th century Arab Muslim conqueror Muhammad Bin Qasim.

The park consists of extensive lighting, pathways and green spaces. The Lady Loyd Pier runs down the middle of the park. Bin Qasim park – as it is referred to by locals – shares the vicinity with another park, Beach Park, constructed at Clifton Beach. This park is spread over an area of 19 ha (47 acres) and was built along the city's coastal driveway to the south. The shrine of Abdullah Shah Ghazi is situated close by.

== See also ==
- List of tourist attractions in Karachi
- Shree Ratneshwar Mahadev Temple, Karachi
