= Kidney Hill Park =

Park in Karachi, Pakistan

Coordinates: 24°52′50″N 67°04′39″E

- Ahmed Ali Park
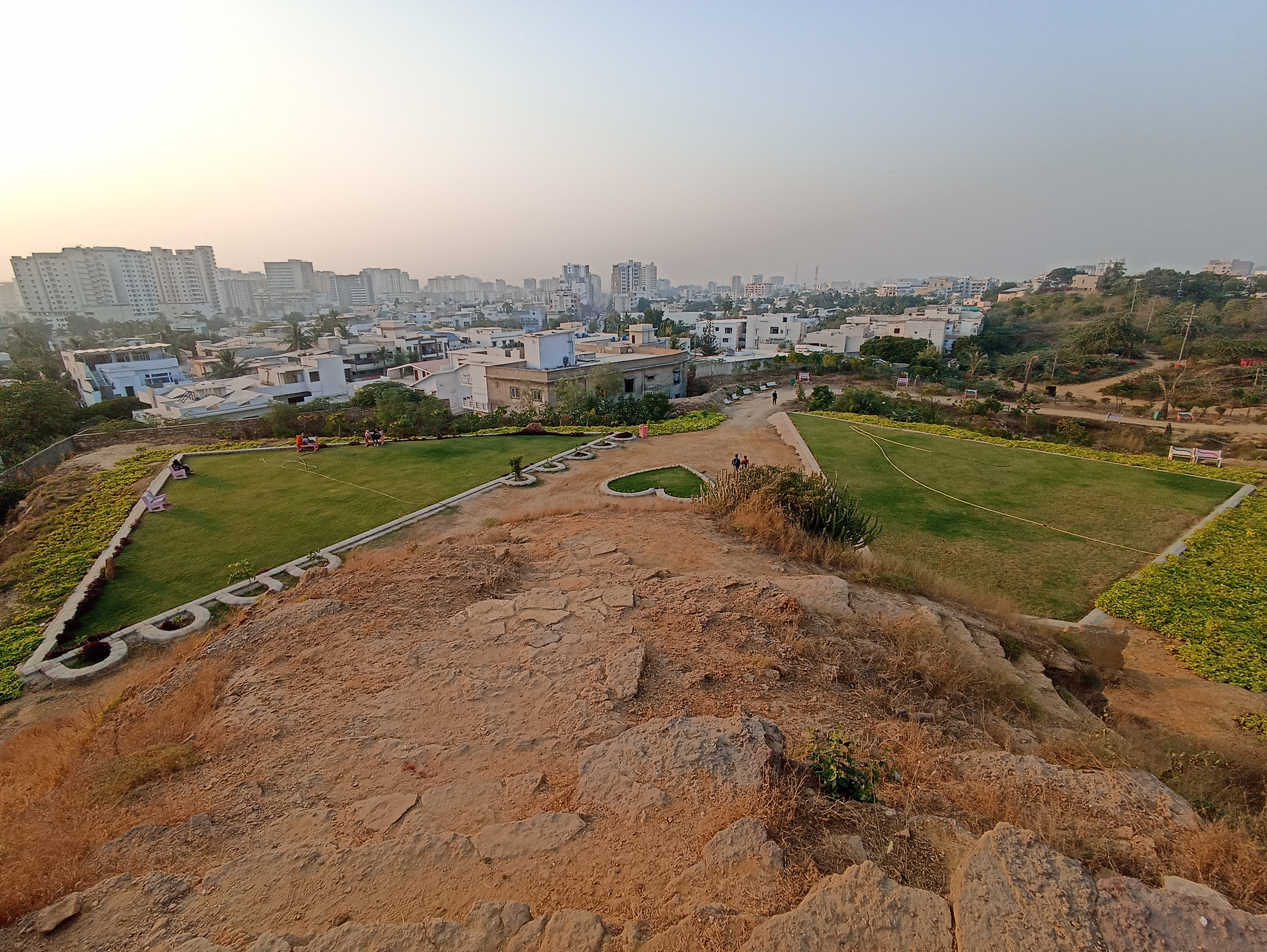
- Interactive map of Kidney Hill Park
- Type: Urban Park
- Location: Karachi, Pakistan
- Area: 82 acres (33 ha)
- Created: Early 1960s
- Operator: Karachi Metropolitan Corporation
- Open: All year
- Status: Open
- Species: Neem, Palm, Date trees

Kidney Hill Park, also known as Ahmed Ali Park, is an urban park located in Karachi, Pakistan. The park is known for its kidney-shaped hilly terrain and is considered one of the highest points in Karachi.

== History ==
The park was designated as a public area in the early 1960s. Despite this, it remained inaccessible to the public for approximately half a century due to unlawful occupation by various public and private entities. In 2019, a significant anti-encroachment campaign was launched in the city by the Supreme Court of Pakistan. As a result of this initiative, all unauthorized structures within the Kidney Hill Park were removed, including a mosque, a shrine, and a graveyard.

After the park land was cleared, the Karachi Metropolitan Corporation (KMC) initiated a project to transform Kidney Hill Park into a modern urban forest. The Mayor of Karachi, Wasim Akhtar, expressed that the revitalization of the park would serve as a present to the residents of Karachi.

== Features and developments ==
The park, which covers an area of over 82 acres, is a nurturing ground for more than 140,000 plant saplings. The KMC has planted a diverse range of trees, such as Neem, palm, and date trees. The park is also equipped with various walking trails and cemented pathways.

In addition to the urban forest, the park is set to house a waterfall, touted to be one of the largest in Pakistan. The waterfall, named in honor of the late former prime minister Benazir Bhutto, was inaugurated by Karachi's Administrator, Barrister Murtaza Wahab. The waterfall is projected to be 200 feet long and 25 feet high.

Future enhancements for the park include the introduction of modern chairlift and zipline projects. These new features are anticipated to transform the park into a distinctive recreational spot in Karachi.
