= Kashmir Park =

Amusement park in Karachi, Pakistan

Coordinates: 24.89454°N 67.06406°E

- Interactive map of Kashmir Park

Kashmir Park (formerly KMC Park / Askari Amusement Park) is an amusement park located in Karachi, Pakistan.

== History ==
The park opened on 15 June 2018 and is Karachi's first Amusement Park. The amusement park includes a 61 metre high ferris wheel, known as the Karachi Eye.

Askari Amusement Park is also called Askari Island Of Fun. It offers many kind of indoor games and rides for kids and adults. It also has a very huge food court where there is a wide selection of renowned food chains offering a diverse range of food and beverage options.

It also offers the wheelchair facility for people with disabilities.

Kashmir Park is run by the Karachi Metropolitan Corporation. Administrator Karachi Barrister Murtaza Wahab renamed Askari Park as Kashmir Park.

== Incidents ==
On 15 July 2018, a 12-year-old girl died and 25 others were injured when the Discovery ride collapsed in mid-air.

After this incident the Askari Amusement Park was reopened on 13 February 2019. According to the park management, the park was opened “after a change in management”. “We have adopted international standards to prevent such sort of incidents from happening,” CEO Askari Park Brig. (Retd) Shehzad told reporters.
