= Khajji Ground =

Area in Karachi, Pakistan

- کھجی گراؤنڈ
- Interactive map of Khajji Ground
- Location: Gulbahar, near Golimar, Karachi, Sindh, Pakistan
- Coordinates: 24°53′41″N 67°01′26″E
- Operator: Karachi Metropolitan Corporation
- Type: Playground and public open space

Khajji Ground, also spelled Khaji Ground, is an open ground in the Gulbahar and Golimar area of Karachi, Sindh, Pakistan. It is used as a playground and is situated adjacent to a graveyard.

== History ==
During the 1990s, the area surrounding Khajji Ground was identified as a focal point of civil unrest and military engagement, specifically during Operation Clean-up, where casualties from factional violence were discarded during this period. In 1995, a nearby girls' primary school was occupied by police forces, affecting access for residents of adjacent neighbourhoods such as Mohammadabad and Waheedabad.

Following security operations involving the Pakistan Rangers, the ground resumed utility as a recreational space. By the early 2000s, it was used for organized sports fixtures and public festivals.

During the 2010s, law enforcement agencies recovered weapons buried within the vicinity of the graveyard. During the 2010s and 2020s, the adjacent Khajji Ground graveyard was used for burials connected to Gulbahar and adjacent neighbourhoods. Targeted killings and shootings in the vicinity were periodically reported in the Rizvia police station limits and nearby parts of Golimar and Gulbahar. In 2025, further arms recovery operations were reported connected to the site.

In March 2025, a petition was filed with the Sindh High Court regarding the use of the ground for garbage dumping and the presence of encroachments. In May 2025, the court directed the Karachi Metropolitan Corporation (KMC) to undertake restoration activities. Subsequent hearings in August 2025 involved summons for municipal officials to address encroachment clearance and funding for rehabilitation.
