= Zamzama Park =

Public park in Karachi, Pakistan

Coordinates: 24°48′54″N 67°2′19″E

- زمزمہ پارک
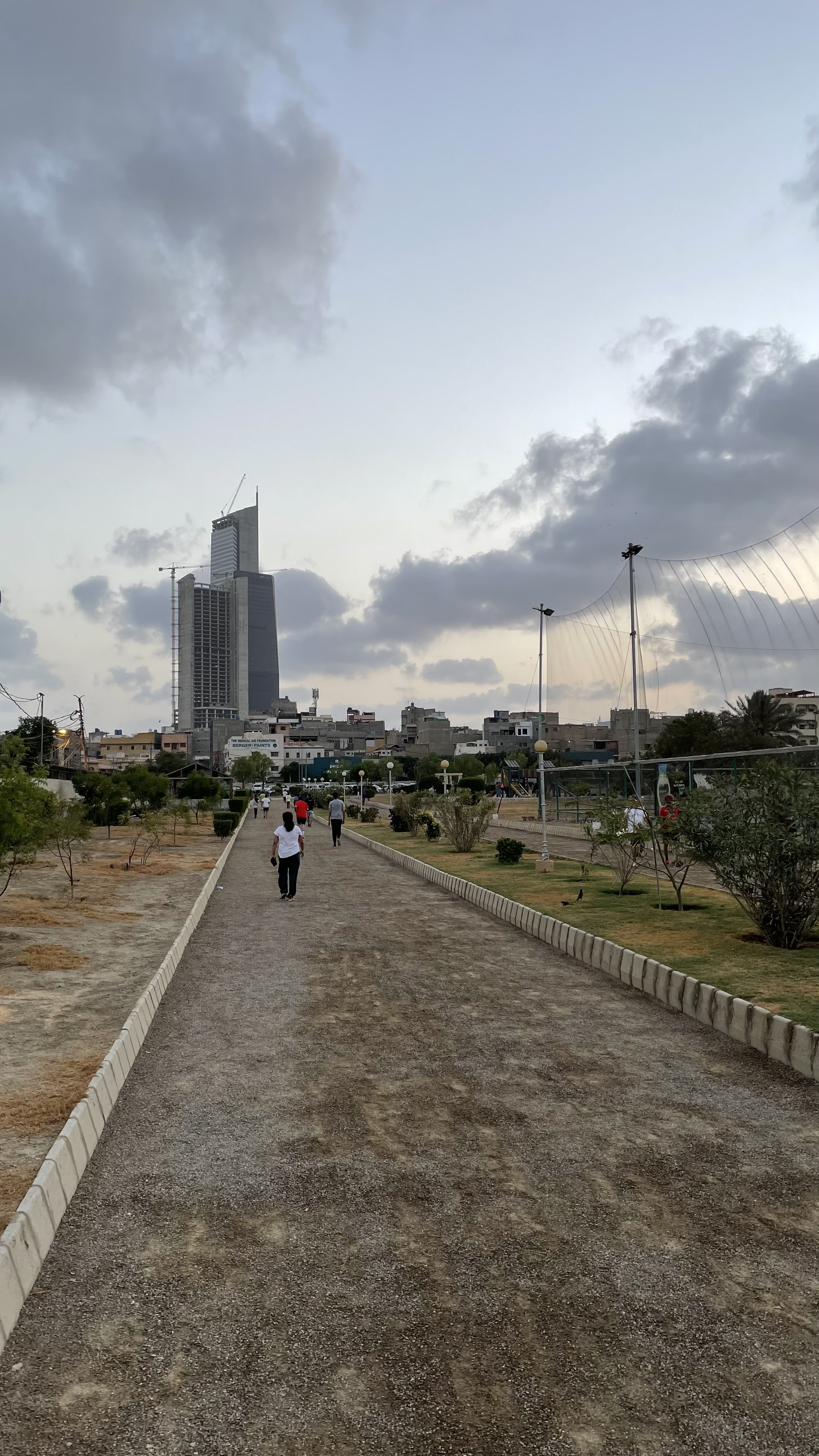
- A path in Zamzama Park
- Interactive map of Zamzama Park
- Type: Urban park
- Location: Defence Housing Authority, Karachi, Sindh, Pakistan.
- Area: 10.5-hectare (26-acre)
- Administrator: DHA
- Website: www.dhakarachi.org/index.php/dha-services/services-offered/creek-vistas/19-joomla/122-zamzama-park

Zamzama Park is a 10.5-hectare (26-acre) park located in the phase 5 area of Defence Housing Authority in Karachi, Sindh, Pakistan. It has jogging tracks, walking paths, a roller blading enclosure, refreshment stand and playground. The display centre and head office of Pakistan Bonsai Society is also located inside the park near Gate 2. The park is hosts an annual bonsai exhibition as well.

== See also ==
- List of parks and gardens in Pakistan
- List of parks and gardens in Lahore
- List of parks and gardens in Karachi
