= Hill Park, Karachi =

Urban park in Pakistan

Coordinates: 24°52′2″N 67°04′16″E

Hill Park
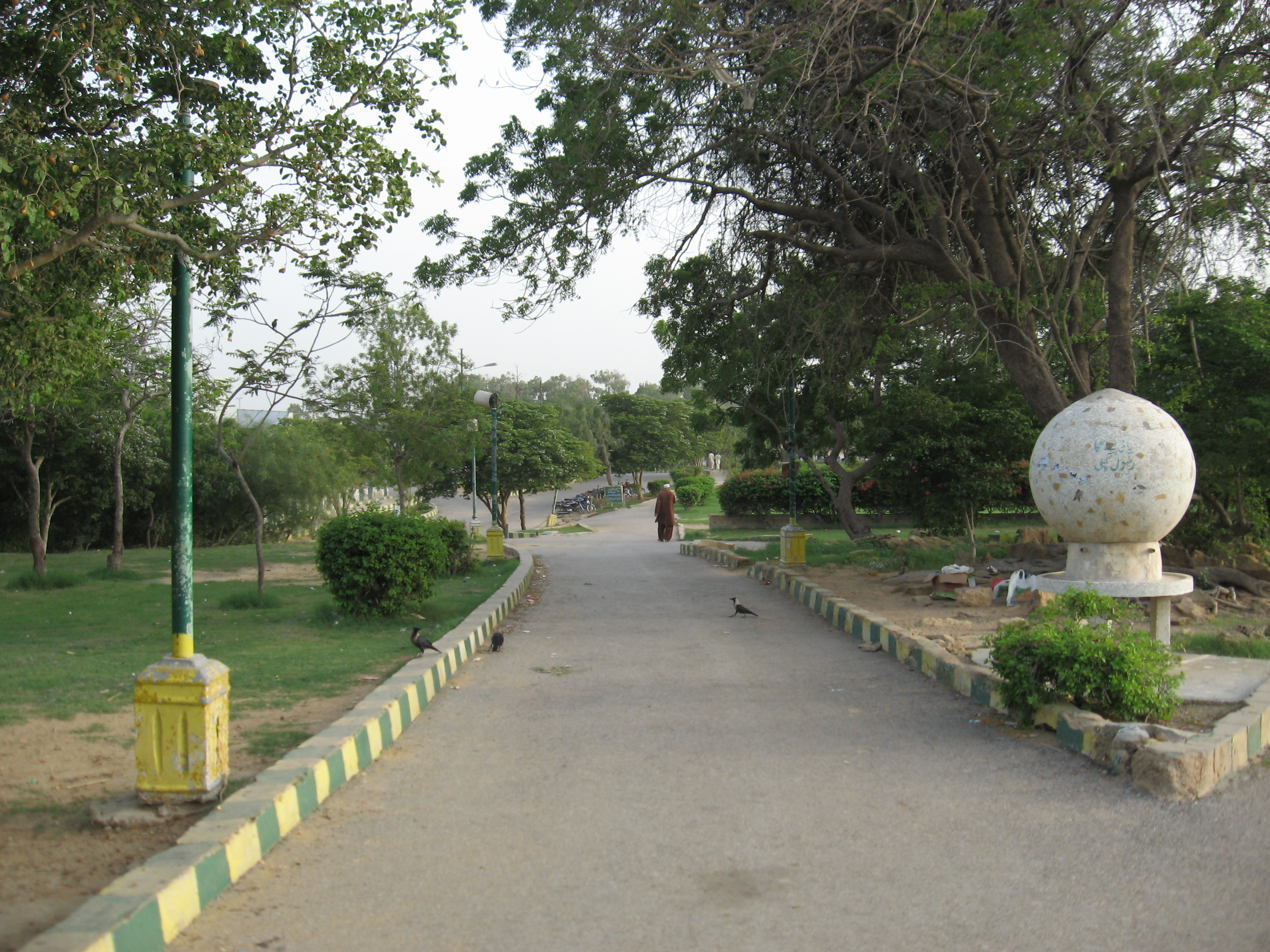
- Hill Park, Karachi
- Interactive map of Hill Park
- Location: PECHS, Jamshed Town, Karachi, Sindh, Pakistan
- Area: 25 ha (62 acres)

Hill Park (Urdu: باغ کوہ) is situated on a hilltop surrounded by a residential area known as PECHS neighborhood of Jamshed Town in Karachi, Sindh, Pakistan. The park is spread over 25 ha (62 acres) and of this only 25% area has been developed as park.

== Description ==
Though closely located with, it is different than Kidney Hill Park. Hill Park is located in Jamshed Town, Karachi, was built in the early 1960s, while Kidney Hill Park is located in Gulshan Town, Karachi. As of November 2021, over 15000 tree saplings have been planted for greenery and to overcome expected heat waves in Karachi.

== See also ==
- List of parks and gardens in Pakistan
- List of parks and gardens in Lahore
- List of parks and gardens in Karachi
