= Bagh-e-Jinnah, Karachi =

Public park in Karachi, Pakistan

Bagh-e-Jinnah
- باغِ جناح
- Interactive map of Bagh-e-Jinnah
- Type: Urban park
- Coordinates: 24.8476°N 67.0326°E
- Area: 16 acres (0.065 km^{2})

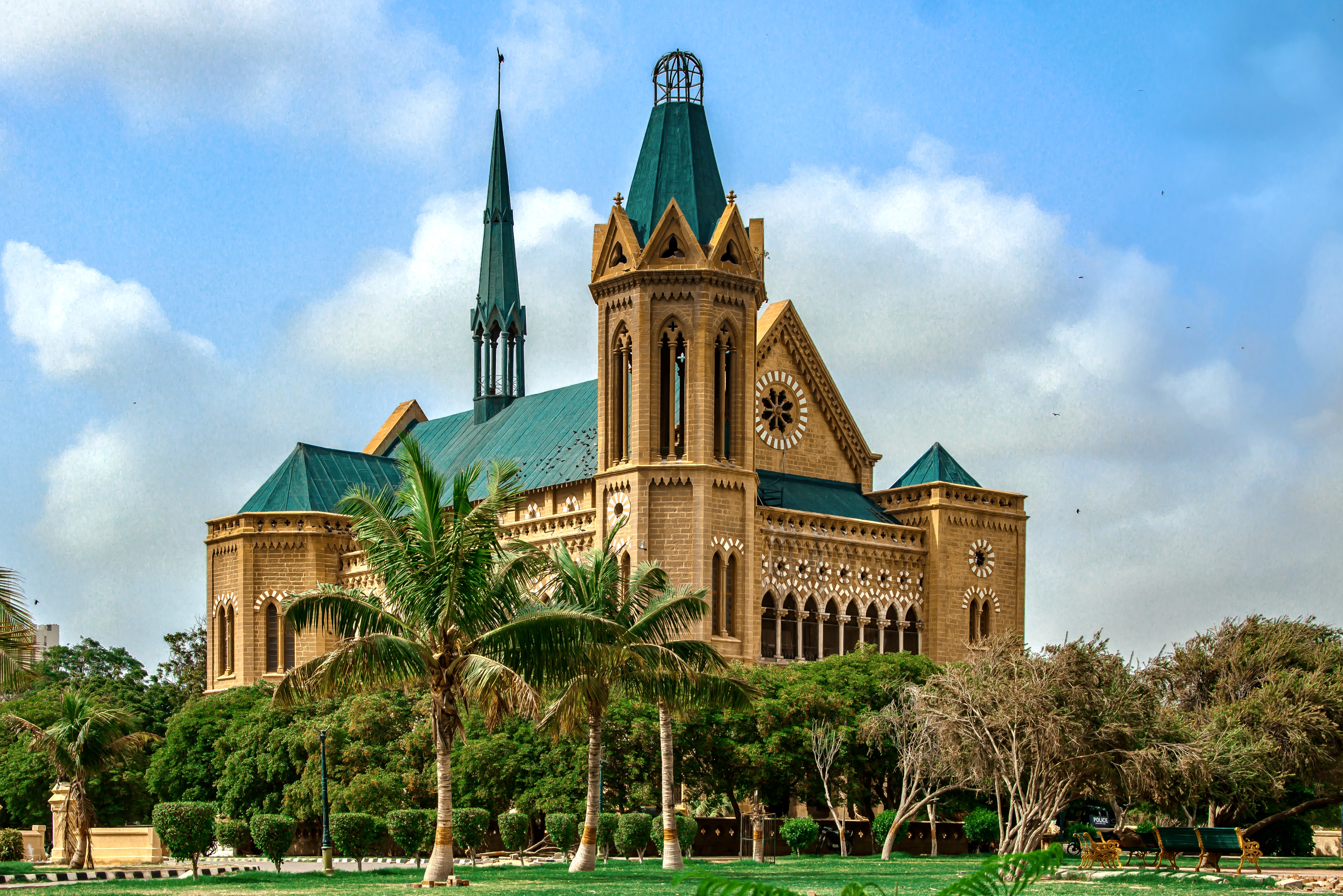
A view of Bagh-e-Jinnah and the Frere Hall

Bagh-e-Jinnah, Karachi (Urdu: باغِ جناح), formerly known as Frere Hall Gardens, is an urban park located between Abdullah Haroon Road (Victoria Road) and Fatima Jinnah Road (Bonus Road) in Karachi, Pakistan.

It is spread over 15 acres and is known for its Frere Hall, constructed in 1865. A public library and an art gallery "Sadequain Hall", named after Pakistan's iconic painter artist Sadequain, are also housed in this hall.

== History ==
In the days of the British rule, it served as the main city hall of Karachi and was the center of Karachi's social and cultural activities. Frere Hall was first opened to the public in 1865. Its construction started in 1863 and was completed in 1865. Constructed in the Venetian Gothic architecture style with yellowish Karachi limestone and red and grey sandstones from the nearby Jungshahi area, Frere Hall was built in honor of Sir Henry Bartle Edward Frere, British Commissioner in Sindh, who was known for promoting economic development in the area of Sindh. In its vicinity are the Marriott Hotel, U.S. Consulate, the Japanese Consulate and the Sindh Club.

After independence of Pakistan in 1947, Bagh-e-Jinnah's large area and park grounds are frequently used for public gatherings by Pakistani political leaders.

== See also ==
- List of parks and gardens in Karachi
