= Jheel Park =

Park in Karachi, Pakistan

Coordinates: 24.8702°N 67.0632°E

- جھیل پارک
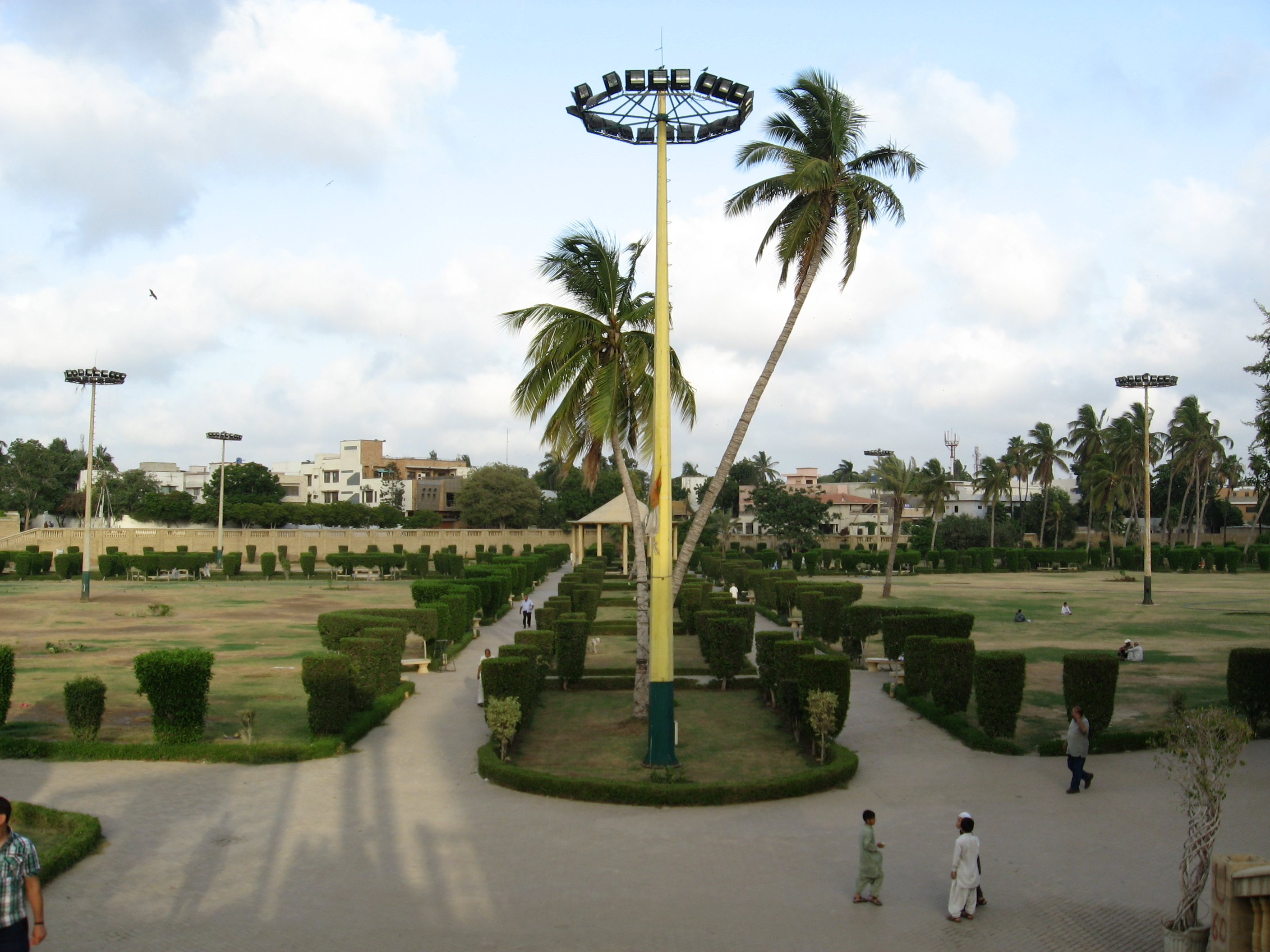
- A view of Jheel Park
- Interactive map of Jheel Park
- Location: P.E.C.H Society, Karachi, Sindh, Pakistan.
- Area: 25 acres (100,000 m^{2})

The Jheel Park (Urdu: جھیل پارک), also known as Society Jheel Park, is a park situated near Tariq Road in P.E.C.H Society, Karachi, Sindh, Pakistan.

The park is constructed on 25 acres (100,000 m^{2}) of land.

== Gallery ==
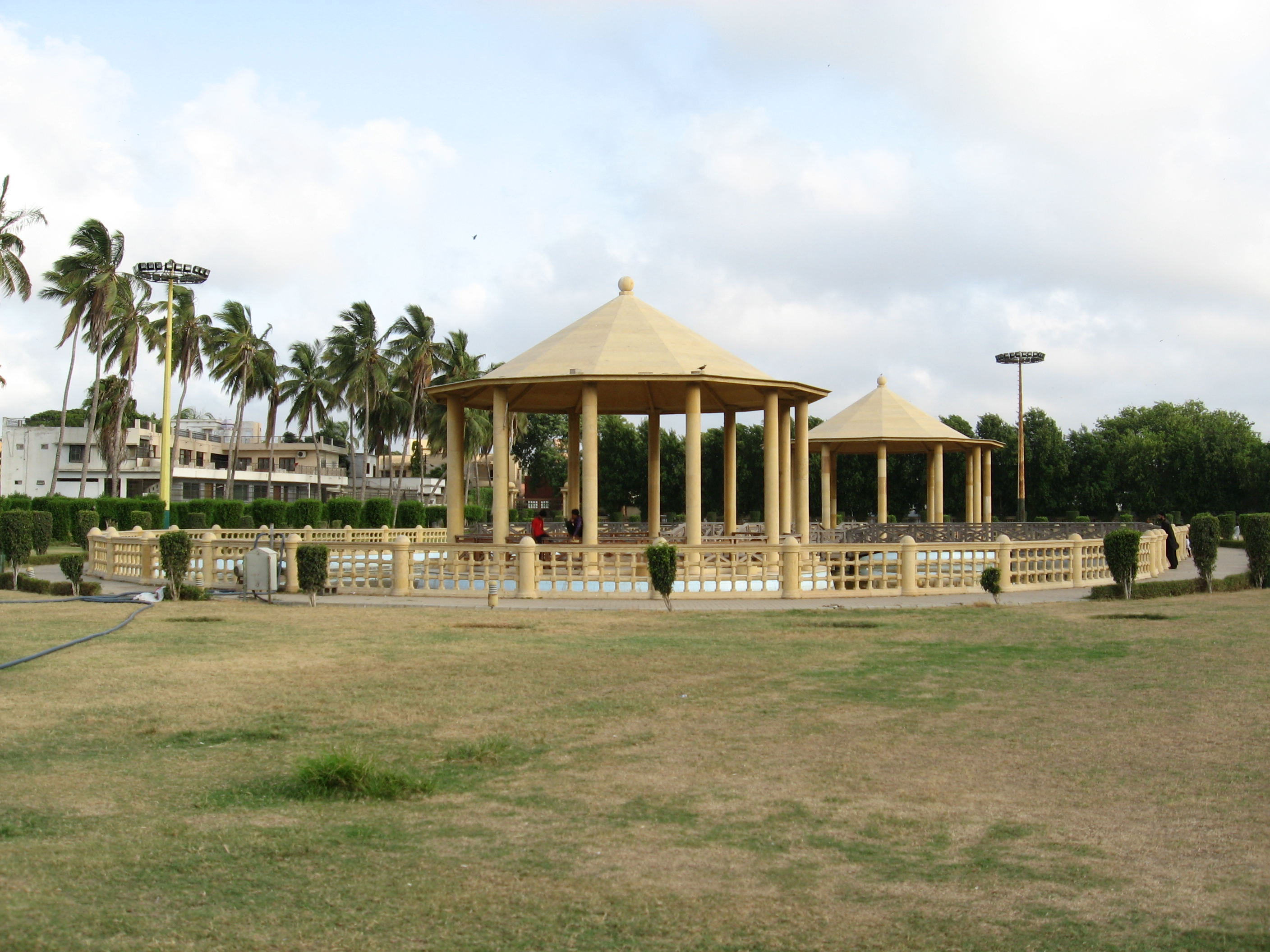
Lake and structures in the Park

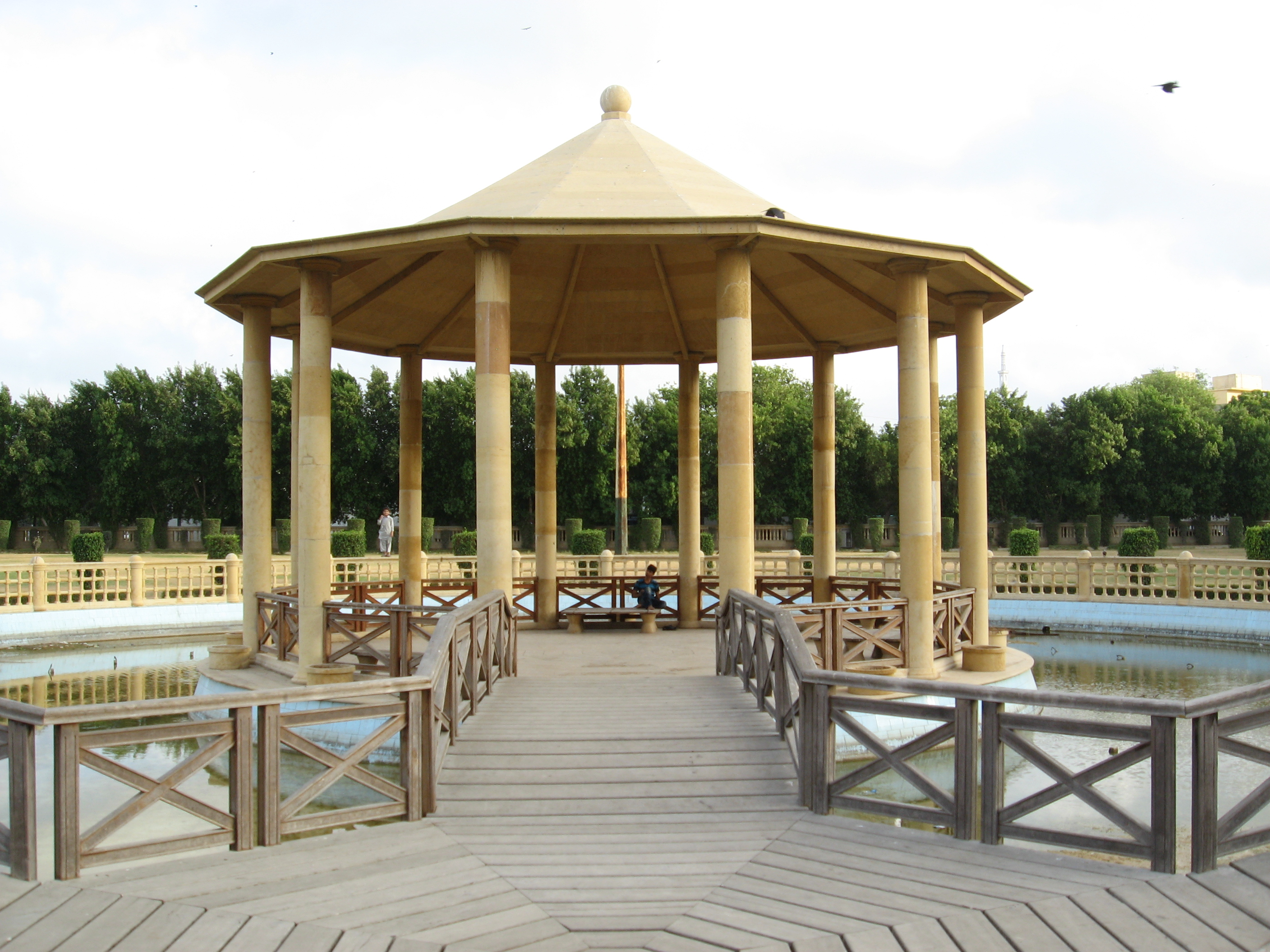
Structure and wooden bridge on the lake

== See also ==
- List of parks and gardens in Pakistan
- List of parks and gardens in Lahore
- List of parks and gardens in Karachi
