= Polo Ground, Karachi =

Park in Karachi, Pakistan

Polo Ground
- Bagh-i-Quaid-i-Azam
- زمین چوگان
- Interactive map of Polo Ground
- Type: Urban park
- Location: Karachi, Sindh, Pakistan
- Coordinates: 24°51′00″N 67°01′24″E
- Area: 20 acres (81,000 m^{2})
- Administrator: Karachi Metropolitan Corporation

Polo Ground, Karachi, also known as Gulshan-e-Jinnah or Bagh-i-Quaid-i-Azam (lit. 'Garden of the Great Leader'), is a park located on Dr. Ziauddin Ahmed Road and Aiwan-e-Sadar Road in Karachi, Sindh, Pakistan. This park is spread over 80,937 m^{2} (871,200 sq ft) and has a football ground, Japanese garden, children's recreation area, bird aviary, and jogging tracks. A baradari is also located there. It also has two five-star hotels nearby. The ground also hosts the biggest Eid congregation in Karachi.

Although the ground is officially known as Bagh-i-Quaid-i-Azam, the former name 'Polo Ground' is still widely used by the people of Karachi.

== History ==
Bagh-e-Quaid-e-Azam has historic significance. It was the venue of the first official march-past of the military parade in front of Pakistani political leaders after independence of Pakistan in 1947. This parade was held here and Quaid-e-Azam Muhammad Ali Jinnah took the salute here as the first Governor General of Pakistan in 1947. This park was used as a polo ground before the 1970s.

The first Eid prayers were organized by the Karachi Metropolitan Corporation at the ground in 1958.

On 26 March 2022, Administrator Karachi Murtaza Wahab inaugurated a bird aviary at the ground. The 30.4 metre-long and 9.2 metre-wide enclosure houses 315 birds, including three pairs of African and Australian parrots.

== Football use ==
In the 20th century, the ground was frequently used for football. In the 1950s and 1960s, it usually hosted the Karachi Senior Division Football League matches.

In the 1990s, FIFA president João Havelange watched an exhibition match at the Polo Ground.

== Cricket use ==
The ground sees a multitude of tape ball cricket matches being simultaneously being played in it. It is said that Hanif Mohammad and his four brothers learned the game there in the 1940s and early 1950s.
