= Gizri =

Neighbourhood of Karachi, Pakistan

- Interactive map of Gizri
- Coordinates: 24°49′03″N 67°02′57″E
- Country: Pakistan
- Province: Sindh
- City District: Karachi

Government
  - Constituency: NA-247 (Karachi South-II)
  - National Assembly Member: Aftab Siddiqui (PTI)

Area
  - Total: 0.343 km^{2} (0.132 sq mi)

Population (2007)
  - Total: approximately 25,000
- Time zone: UTC+05:00 (PKT)
- Postal code: 75600

Gizri, (Urdu: گزری), is a historic neighborhood and former fishing village located close to Clifton Beach, on the Arabian Sea, in Karachi, Pakistan.

== History ==
Gizri, a 250-year-old fishing village now part of Clifton and administered by the Cantonment Board Clifton (CBC), has a rich cultural and historical legacy. Originally home to Sindhi-speaking fisherfolk since 1760. These Sindhi fishermen still reside in a neighborhood named 'Machhi Para' and they are the oldest inhabitants of this locality. The area has evolved into a neighborhood known for its intellectuals and scholars.

The name "Gizri" is believed to have evolved from the Urdu word "Guzz", meaning "courtyard". Many 19th-century buildings in Karachi were constructed using the renowned Gizri stone - a historical hallmark that endures. This distinctive stone, a limestone, also widely used for gravestones, inspired the notion of a "Guzz" - a courtyard of stone.

== Area's major ethnic groups ==
Like most areas in urban Karachi there are also several ethnic groups living in Gizri including, Sindhis, Pashtuns, Punjabis, Brahuis, Kashmiris, Seraikis, Balochs, Memons and Gujaratis.

== Location within Karachi city ==
Gizri is located near Gizri Creek and Clifton Beach on the Arabian Sea coast. The locality is surrounded on most sides by the Defence Housing Authority and property values in Gizri have risen sharply as a result. Formerly a fishing village, it has developed into a modern residential area that includes several apartment buildings. Most of its fishermen later sold their land and moved to Ibrahim Hyderi, although some still live in a part of Gizri called Machhi Para.

According to The News International in 2007:

"Gizri is a part of the Union Council (UC) 11, Kehkashan, Saddar Town. It has a population of around 25,000 people."

== Gizri Flyover (also known as the Gizri Bypass) ==
Gizri Flyover (also known as the Gizri Bypass) was developed merely to connect the vehicular traffic of an upper-class residential area viz DHA Karachi to the rest of the city by flying over a low-income or 'informal settlement' viz Gizri area. Gizri Flyover was built so that DHA Karachi residents could 'escape' the traffic congestion in the Gizri Market area. Gizri Flyover is 1.2 km long and was built for Rs 600 million in 2009.
