= Aziz Bhatti Park =

Park in Karachi, Pakistan

Coordinates: 24.9138°N 67.0950°E

- باغ عزیز بهٹی
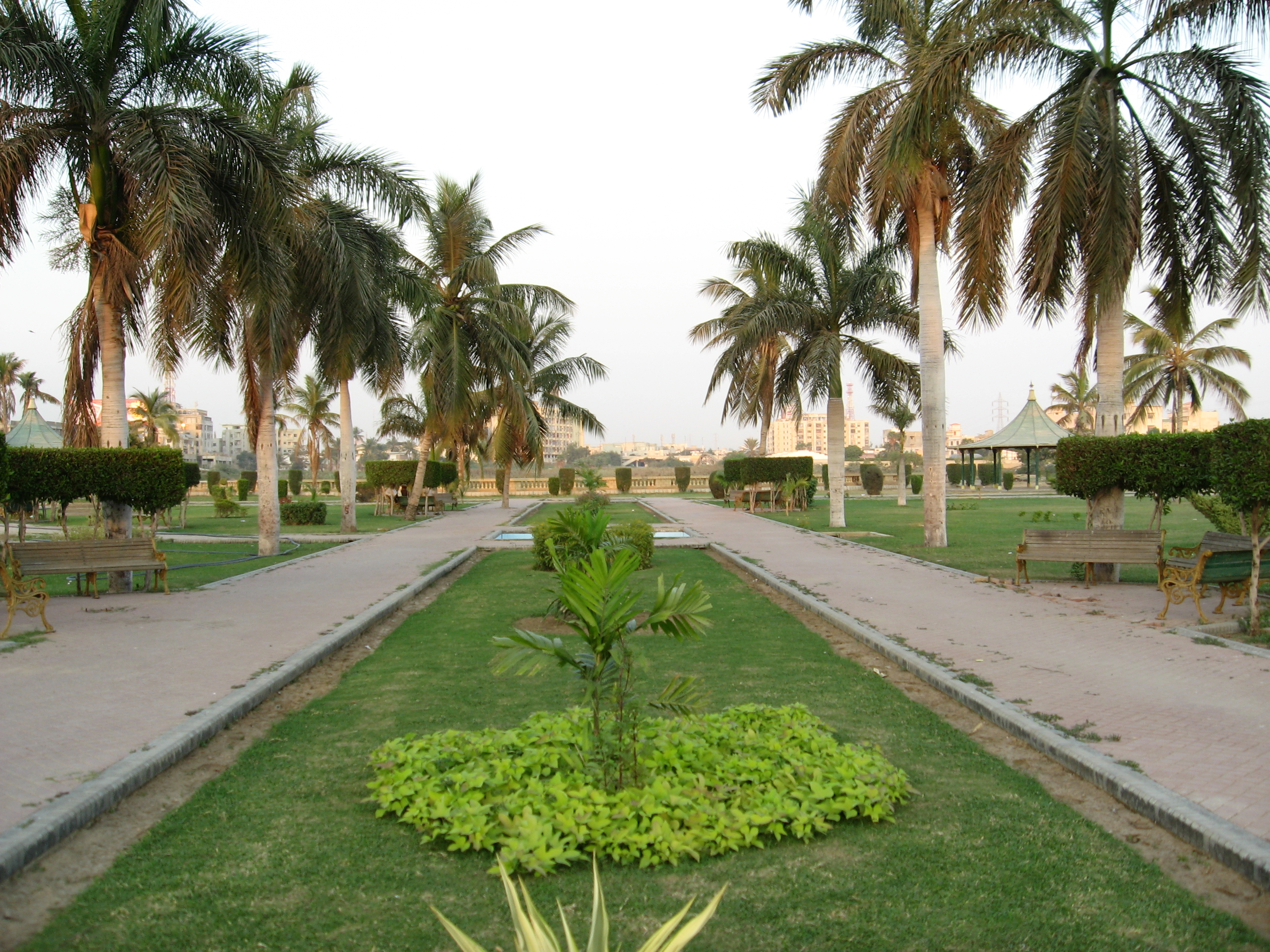
- A view of Aziz Bhatti Park
- Interactive map of Aziz Bhatti Park
- Type: Urban park
- Location: Gulshan-e-Iqbal, Karachi, Sindh, Pakistan.
- Area: 37 acres (150,000 m^{2})
- Created: 1972; 54 years ago
- Administrator: Karachi Metropolitan Corporation

The Aziz Bhatti Park (Urdu: باغ عزیز بهٹی) is located near Federal Urdu University on University Road in Gulshan-e-Iqbal, Karachi, Sindh, Pakistan.

The Park is named after the Nishan-e-Haider recipient Major Aziz Bhatti of Punjab Regiment, Pakistan Army. He defended Burki sector of Lahore on 6 September 1965, against an Indian attack during the Indo-Pakistani War of 1965.

The Aziz Bhatti Park was developed in 1972 by Karachi Development Authority and handed over to Karachi Metropolitan Corporation in 1992. The park has 150,000 m^{2} land. There is also a natural lake in park.

== Gallery ==
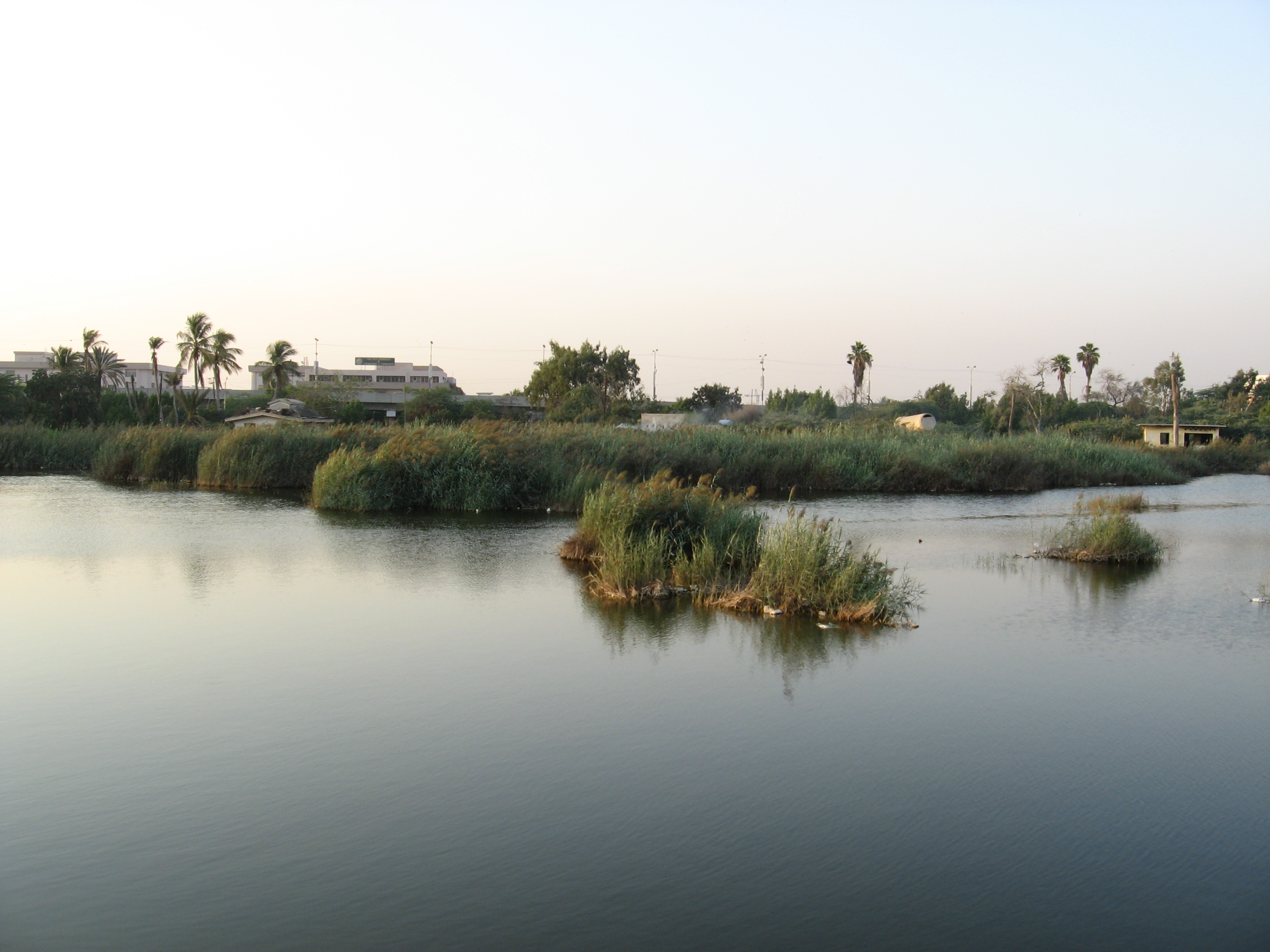
Natural lake in Aziz Bhatti Park

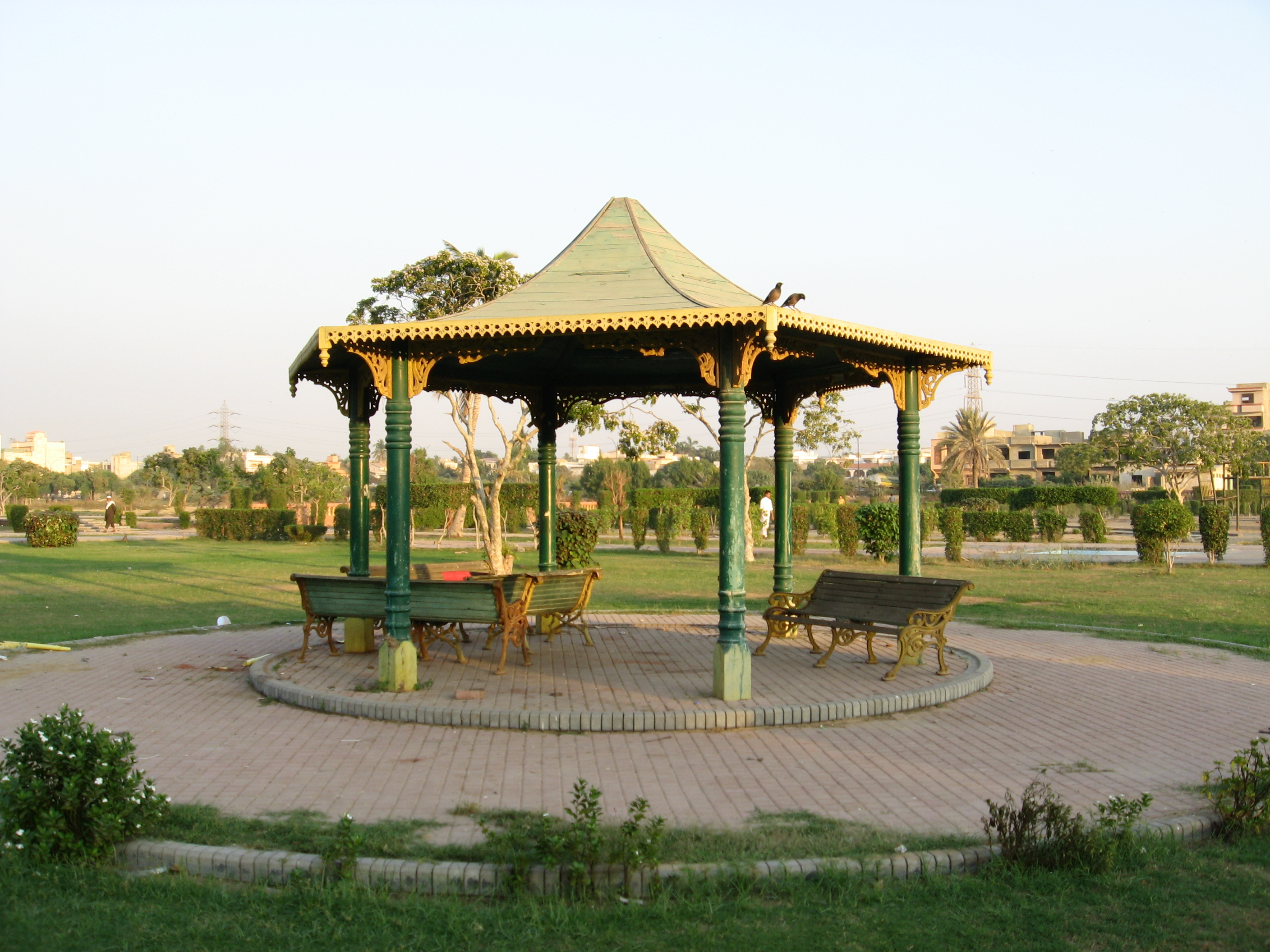
Benches and shed in the park

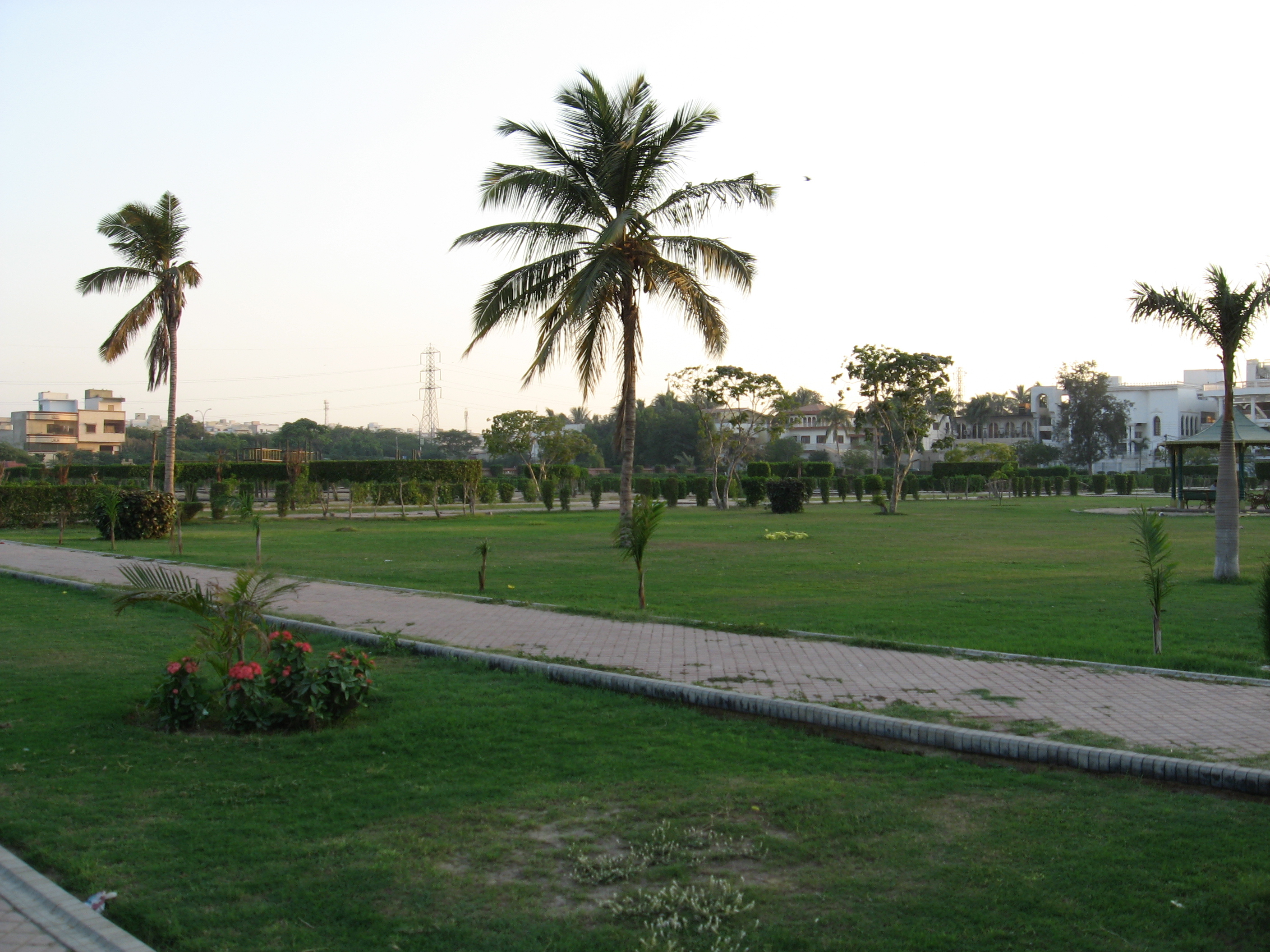
A view of Aziz Bhatti Park

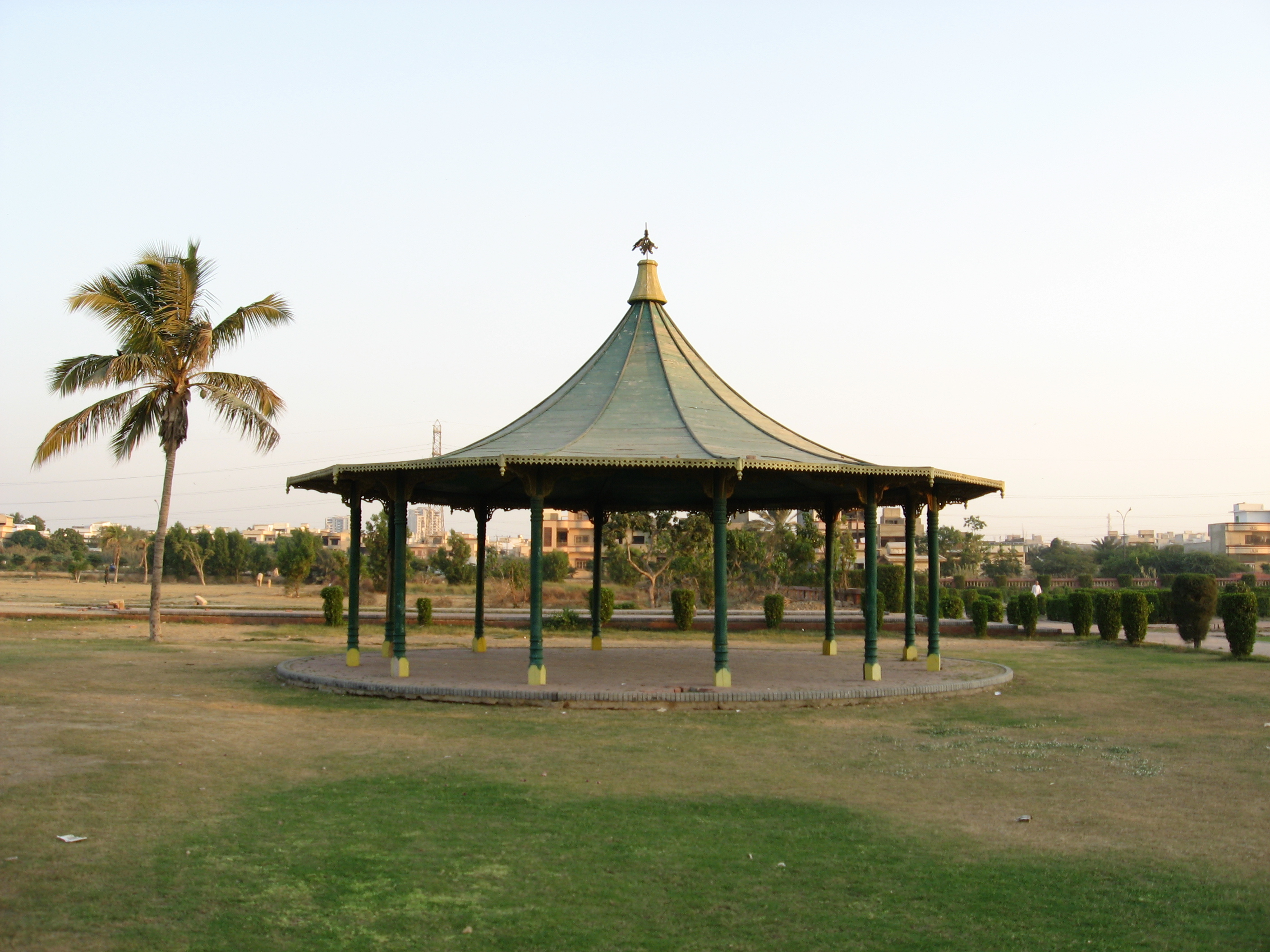
A shed in the park

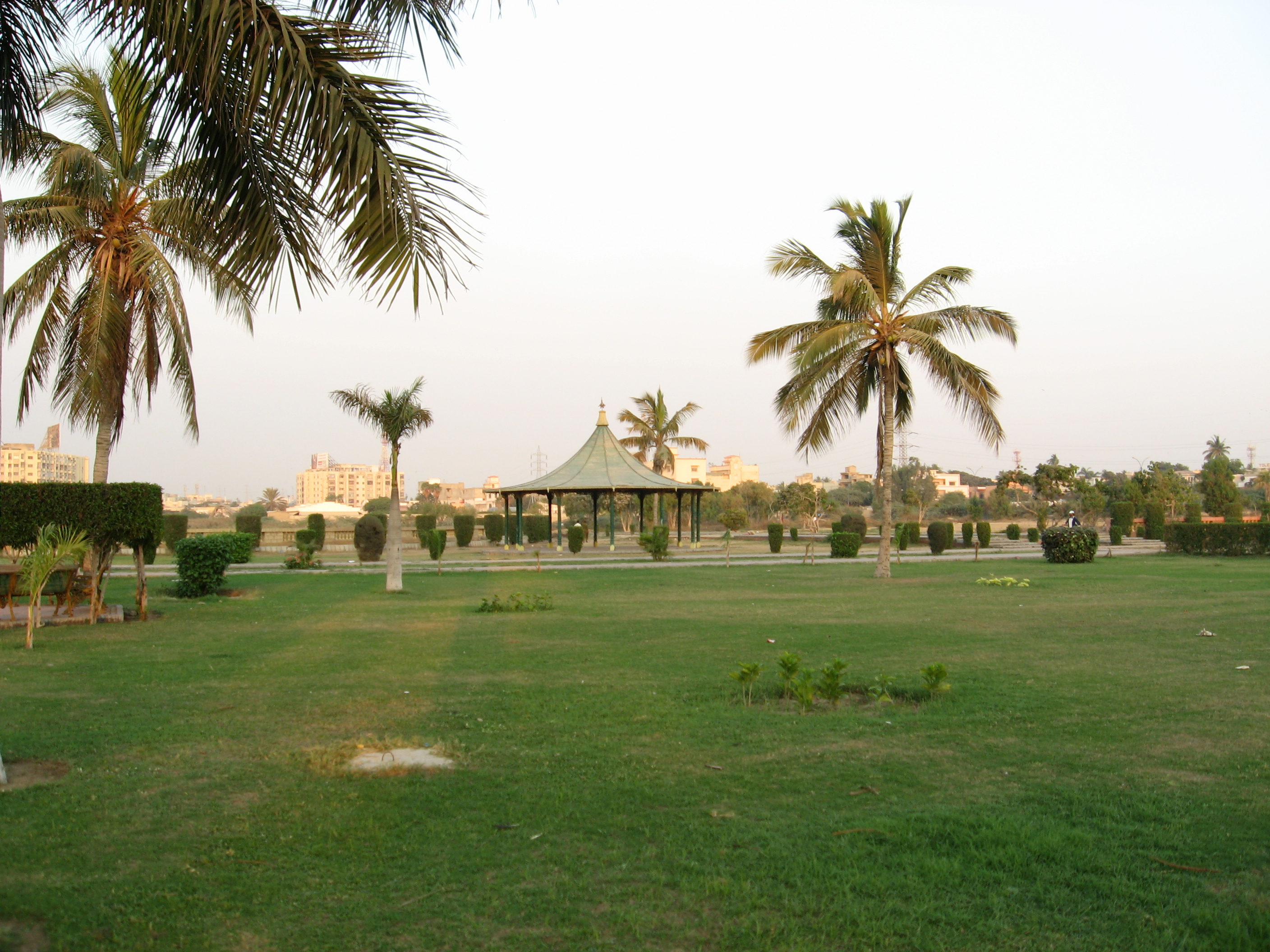
Aziz Bhatti Park

== See also ==
- List of parks and gardens in Pakistan
- List of parks and gardens in Lahore
- List of parks and gardens in Karachi
