= Shree Ratneshwar Mahadev Temple, Karachi =

Hindu temple in Karachi, Pakistan

Shree Ratneshwar Mahadev Temple
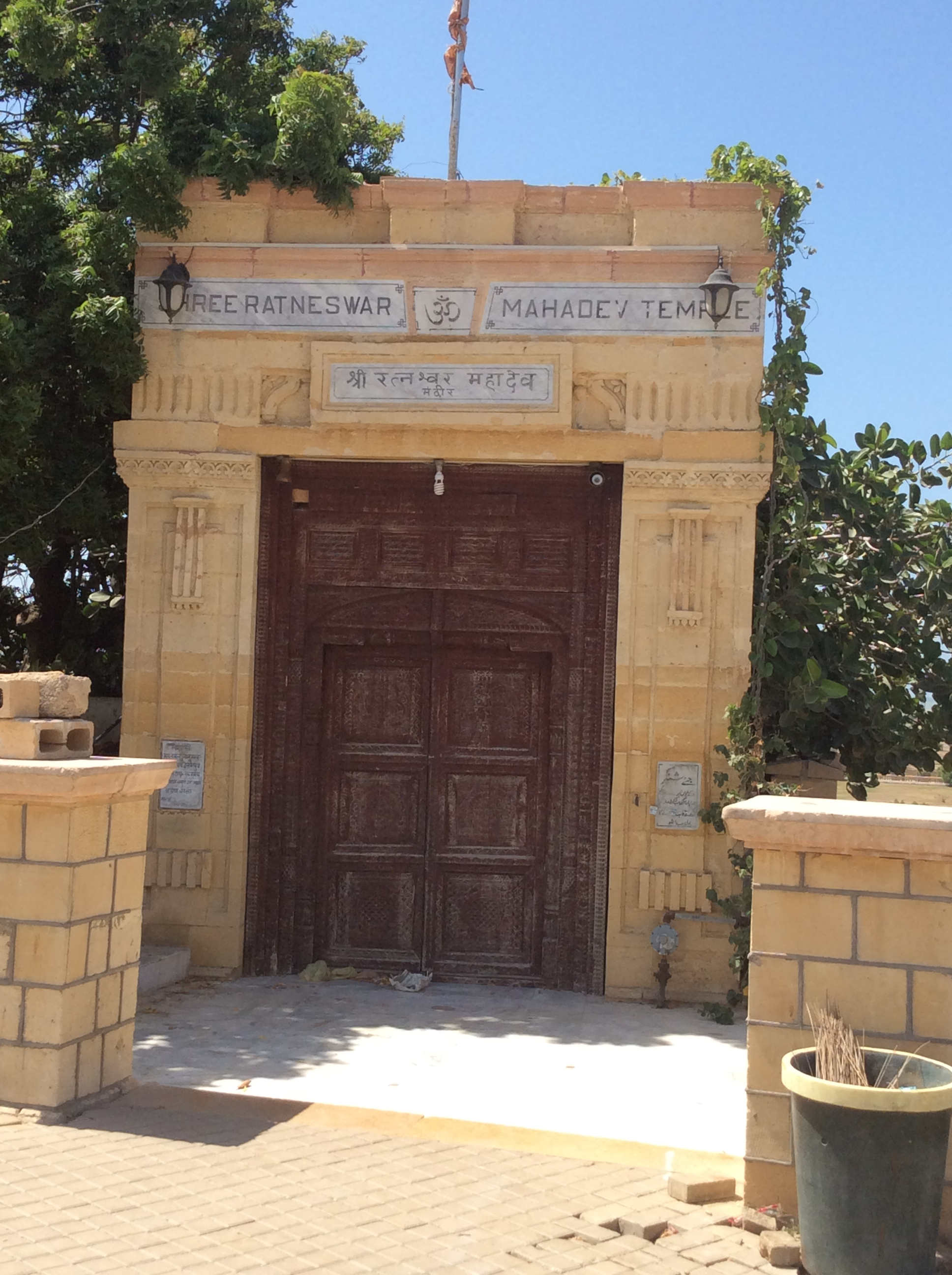
- Entrance to the underground Shree Ratneshwar Mahadev Temple

- Location within Sindh Location within Pakistan Location within Asia

Religion
- Affiliation: Hinduism
- District: Karachi
- Deity: Shiva
- Festival: Shivratri

Location
- Location: Karachi
- State: Sindh
- Country: Pakistan
- Coordinates: 24°48′45.9″N 67°01′36.0″E

Architecture
- Type: Hindu Temple

Ratneshwar Mahadev Temple is a historic underground Hindu temple in Karachi, Pakistan. It is located near the Clifton Beach in Clifton. The temple is famous for its annual Shivratri celebration, and during religious celebrations, around 25,000 pilgrims visit the temple.

== Architecture ==
Shree Ratneshwar Mahadev Temple is an underground temple with six levels. There are two staircases near Jehangir Kothari Parade that leads to the underground levels. The fourth underground level is a courtyard floor made of marble. The fifth level has a tunnel which is believed to lead to the Mohatta Palace. There is also a fresh water spring inside the Cave.

In 2014, under Clifton traffic improvement project the construction of two underpasses and a flyover were started near the temple due to which cracks started appearing in the cave. The Pakistan Hindu Panchayat filed a case in Supreme Court against this, and the Court ordered restoration of the temple.

== Religious significance ==
Hindus in Karachi believe that the third eye of the Shiva watches the Sea and prevents the Sea disasters like floods from happening. It is believed that Lord Shiva used to live in this cave, and also that Guru Nanak used to meditate in this cave.

== Shivratri Celebration ==
On the Shivratri night, Hindus in Karachi fast and visit the temple. Later, devotees from the Chanesar Goth come to the temple carrying water from the Ganges, which Hindus generally consider to be sacred, in order to bathe the idol of Shiva. Puja is performed until 5 am, when an aarti is then done. Devotees then walk barefoot with women carrying a pooja thali containing flowers, incense sticks, rice, coconut and a diya to the sea after which they are free to break their fast. Later they eat food prepared in the temple kitchen for breakfast.

== See also ==
- Ramapir Temple Tando Allahyar
- Umarkot Shiv Mandir
- Shri Krishna Mandir, Rawalpindi
- Krishna Temple, Sadiqabad
- Darya Lal Mandir
- Panchmukhi Hanuman Temple
