= Clifton Urban Forest =

Urban forest project in Karachi, Pakistan

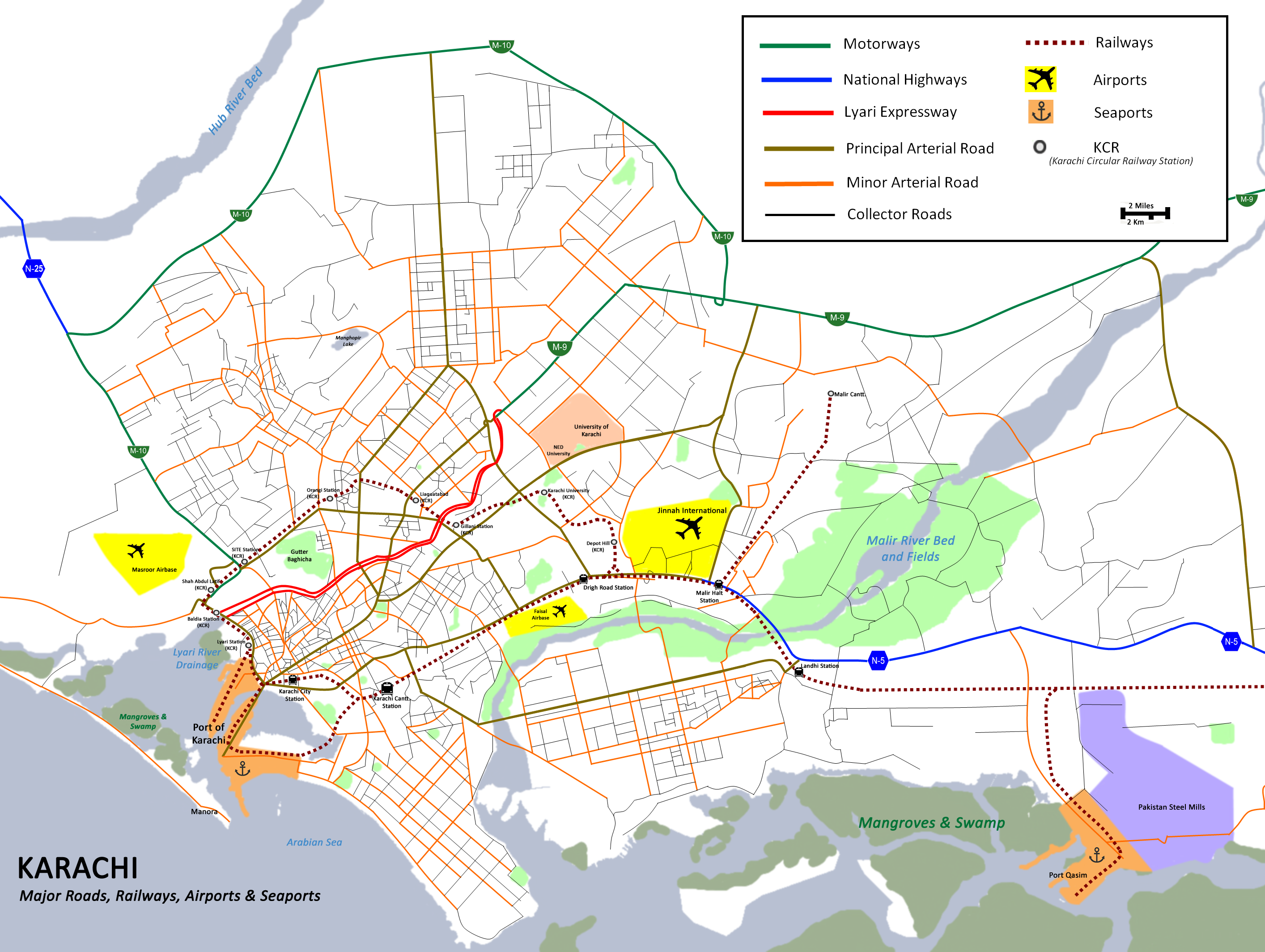
- Location within Karachi
- Interactive map of Clifton Urban Forest

Geography
- Location: Karachi, Pakistan
- Coordinates: 24.809°N 67.017°E
- Area: 200 acres (81 ha)

Administration
- Established: January 8, 2021; 5 years ago
- Owner: Masood Lohar
- Website: www.cliftonurbanforest.org

Clifton Urban Forest is an urban forest project currently being developed near the affluent neighborhood and seaside of Clifton in Karachi, Pakistan. Planted using the Miyawaki technique, it now hosts over 800,000 tree saplings of dozens of species, including moringa, sukhchain, oleander, date palms, and wild almonds. It was founded and directed by Masood Lohar, a climate change adaptation and resilience expert, on January 8, 2021 in close coordination with the Government of Sindh. The area covers around 200 acres along the seaside, with the saplings being brought in from Lohar's nursery in Hyderabad, Pakistan, which was paid for with his pension from his former job at the UNDP Global Environmental Finance Unit.

The project's aim is to improve the climatic conditions and resilience of Karachi, and to solve the city's problems of high temperatures, runoff water, and bad air quality. To achieve this, the end goal is to plant around one million Salvadora persica in the area, known locally as peelu. The land along the beach being planted used to be a trash dumping ground with heaps of debris, waste, litter, and more. The garbage was moved and formed mounts along the edge of the ocean, forming a barrier against the sea's salt spray.

== Residing birds' species ==
Over 150 different types of aquatic and terrestrial birds can now be found in the forest. Two internationally near-threatened birds on the International Union for Conservation of Nature (IUCN) red list, the black-tailed godwit & eurasian curlew, were spotted in the urban forest lagoon in October 2022.
