= Teen Talwar =

- تين تلوار
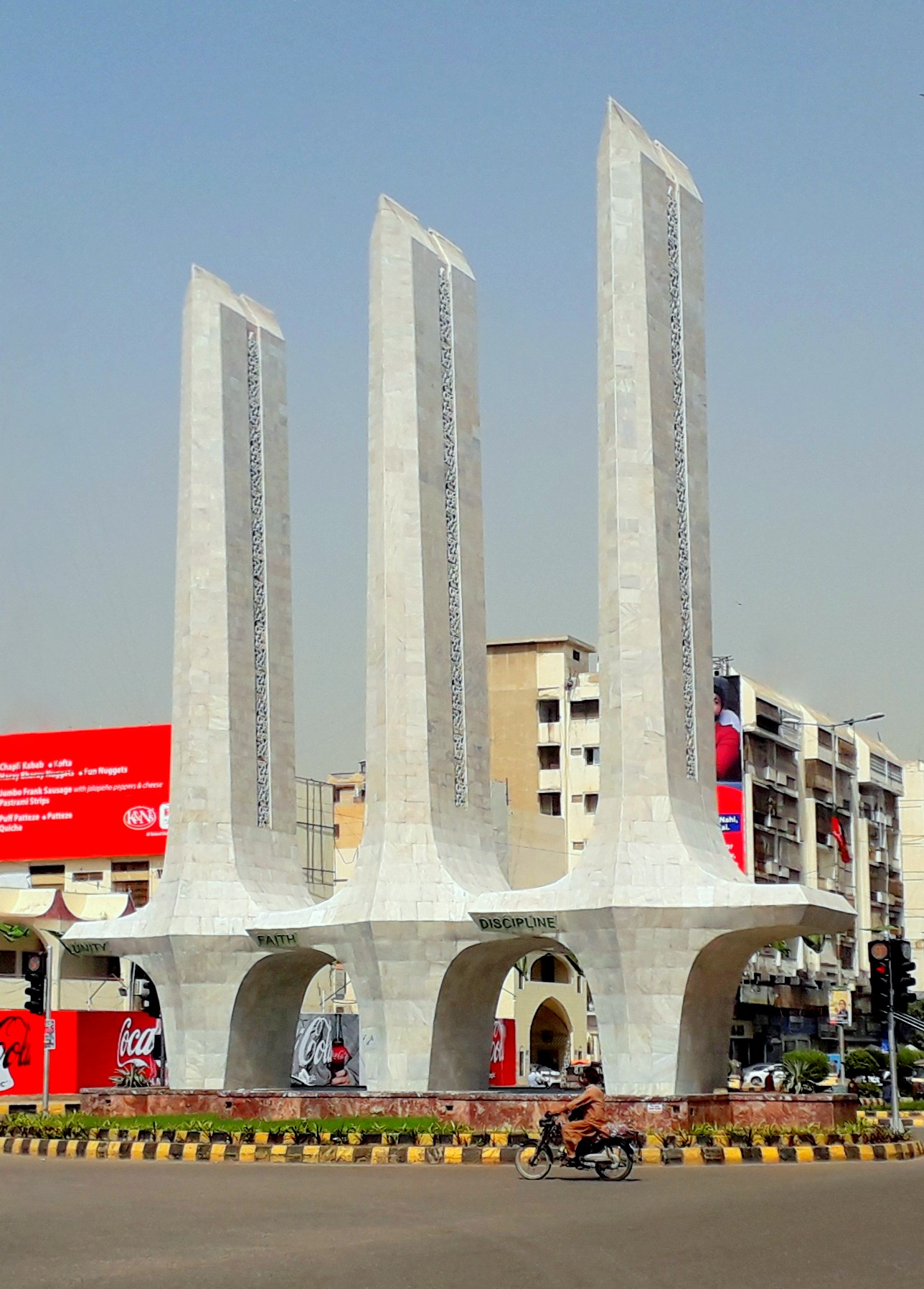
- Teen Talwar in Clifton
- Interactive map of the Teen Talwar area

General information
- Type: Public monument
- Location: Clifton, Karachi
- Coordinates: 24°50′02″N 67°02′01″E
- Construction started: 1973
- Completed: 1974
- Landlord: Karachi Metropolitan Corporation

The Teen Talwar (Three Swords) monument is located in Clifton, Karachi, Sindh, Pakistan. The three marble swords are inscribed with Quaid-e-Azam Mohammad Ali Jinnah's creeds Unity, Faith and Discipline. It was commissioned by Pakistan's former president and Prime Minister, Zulfikar Ali Bhutto in 1973, and was designed by Zoroastrian architect Minoo Mistri.

== Background ==
Zulfikar Ali Bhutto approved the monument as part of a beautification scheme to depict the Pakistan Peoples Party's electoral symbol of a sword. The initial concept was for the three swords to be shown in the PPP's electoral colours (black, green and red). Later, the idea was changed to white marble.

Designed by Architect Minoo Mistri and constructed during Zulfiqar Ali Bhutto's period, it depicts Quaid-e-Azam's three pillars of strength: Unity, Faith & Discipline. It was constructed by well known contractor company M/s Mughal Corporation whose owner was Mr Haji Ilyas Hassan Baltistani who also build Laprus Hospital and so many other government buildings. He was a friend of Mr Muhammad Ali Habib (owner of Habib Group) and he was a richest man of his time and well known personality in Pakistan and in Baltistani Community.

== Current status ==
The structure stands on a small roundabout in the middle of the road. This asphalt island is the remnant of a much larger, grassy roundabout that controlled traffic at the intersection of Chartered Accountants Avenue, Bath Island Road and main Khayaban-e-Iqbal Road. As the original roundabout has been replaced with traffic signals, the remaining circular island tends to cause traffic tie-ups. Despite a clean up and restoration of the monument in 2008 (which also reduced the size of the roundabout), another problem has been the persistence of advertising, political banners and flyers that are continually placed on the structure, as the monument rests in a highly visible place in the city.
