= Clifton, Karachi =

Clifton کلفٹن
- Locality
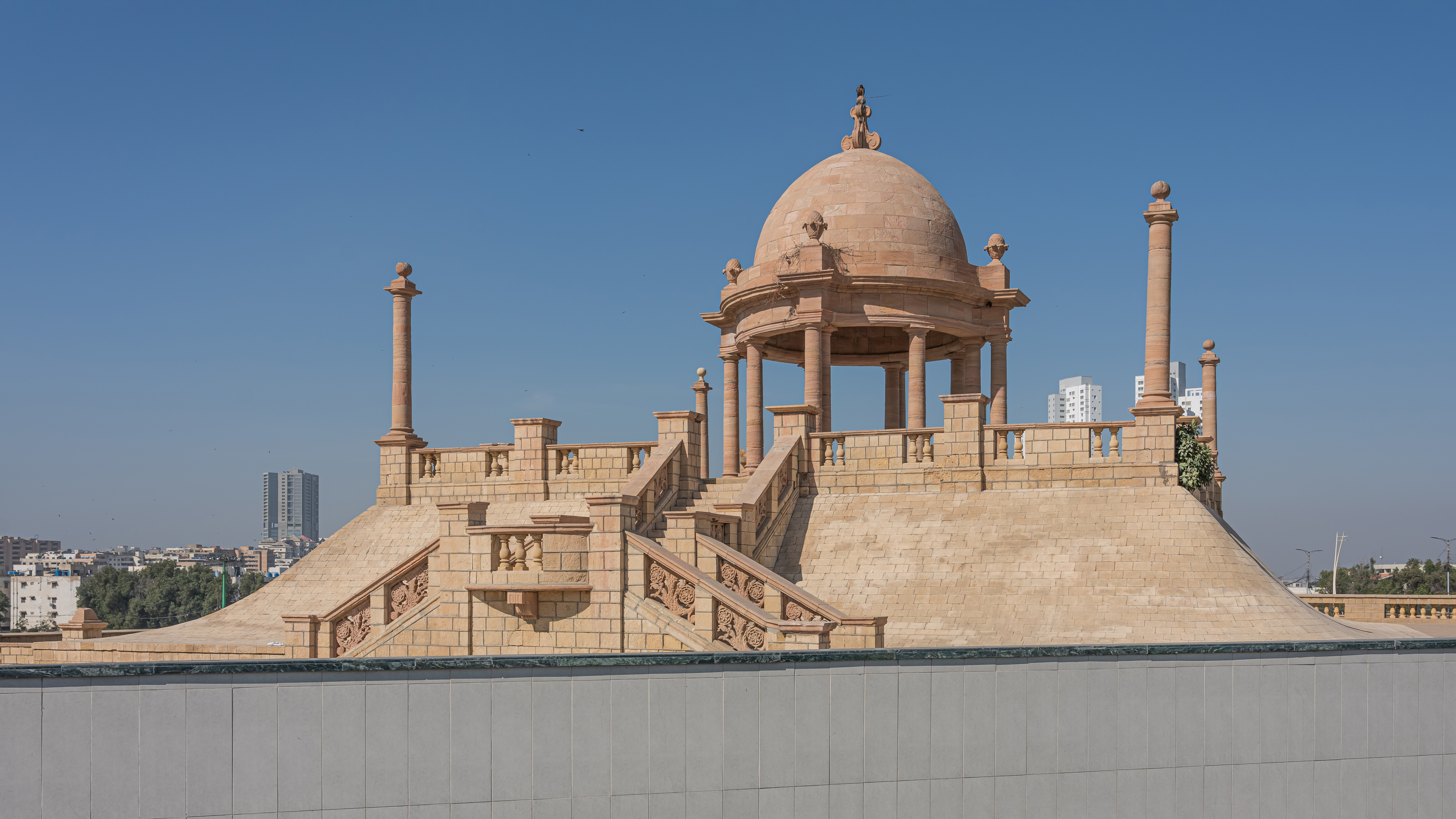
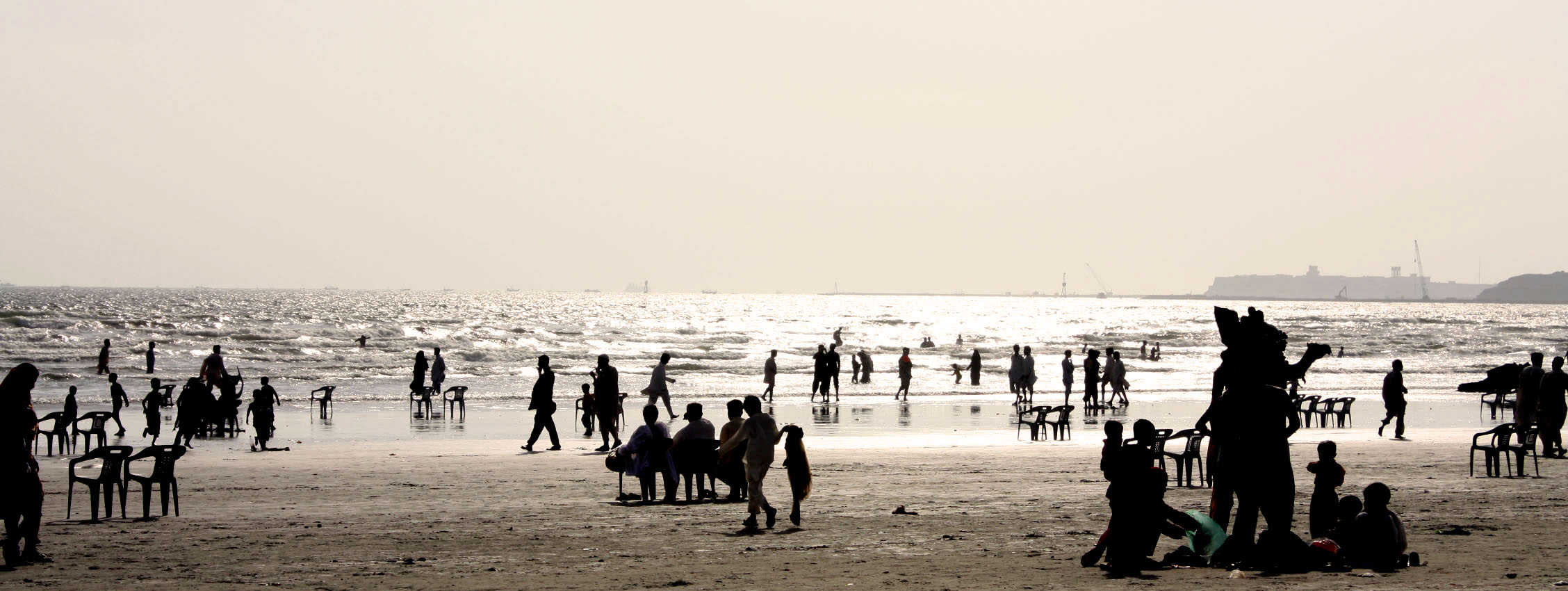
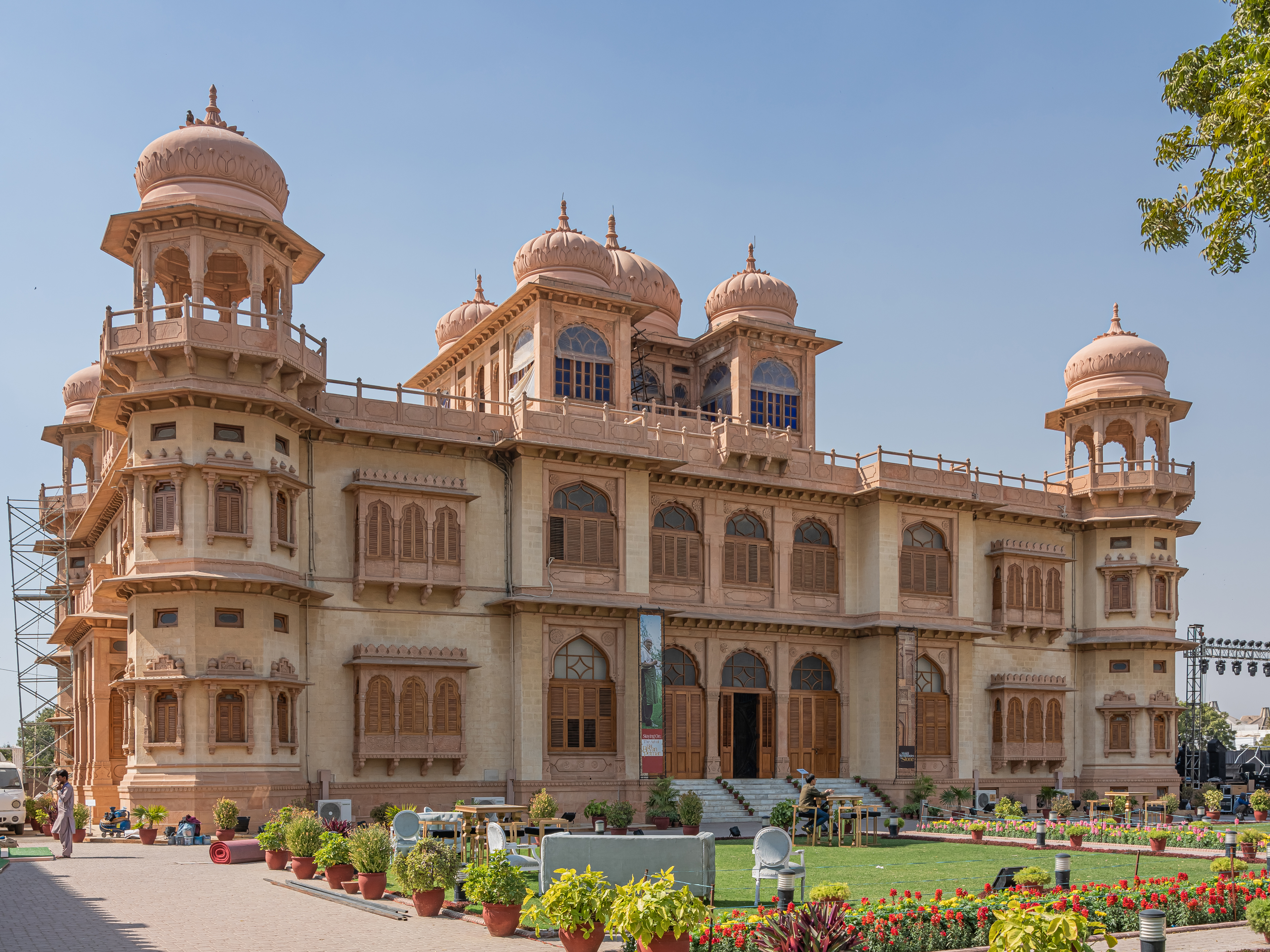
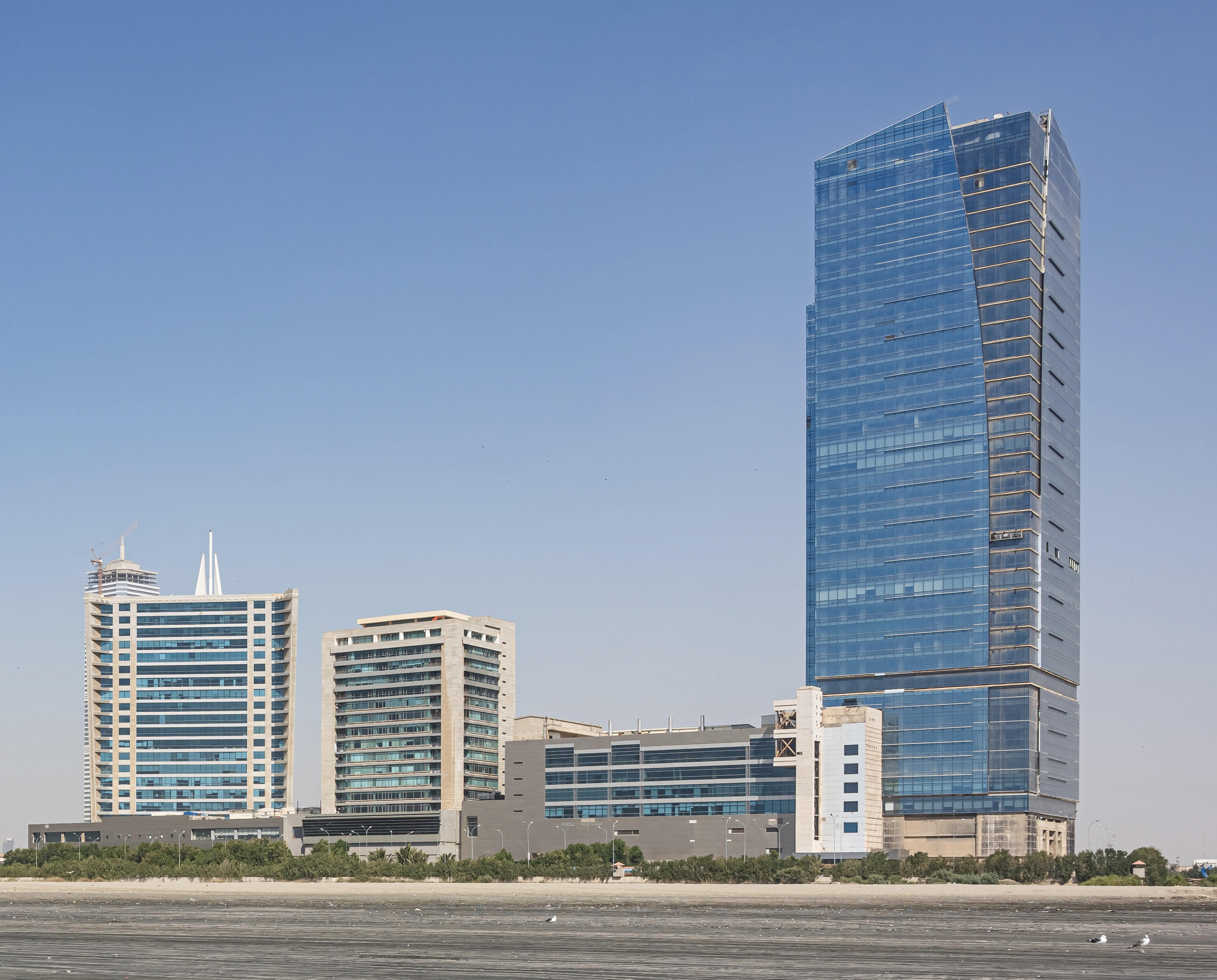
- Clockwise from top: Clifton's Katrak Bandstand, Dolmen City, Clifton Beach, Mohatta Palace
- Interactive map of Clifton
- Coordinates: 24°49′N 67°02′E
- Country: Pakistan
- Province: Sindh
- City: Karachi
- District: Karachi South

Population
  - Total: 245,943

Clifton is an upscale and historic seaside locality in Karachi, Pakistan. It is one of the most affluent parts of the city, home to some of Karachi's most expensive real estates. It is home to several foreign consulates, while its commercial centres are amongst the most high-end in Pakistan, with a strong presence of international brands.

== History ==
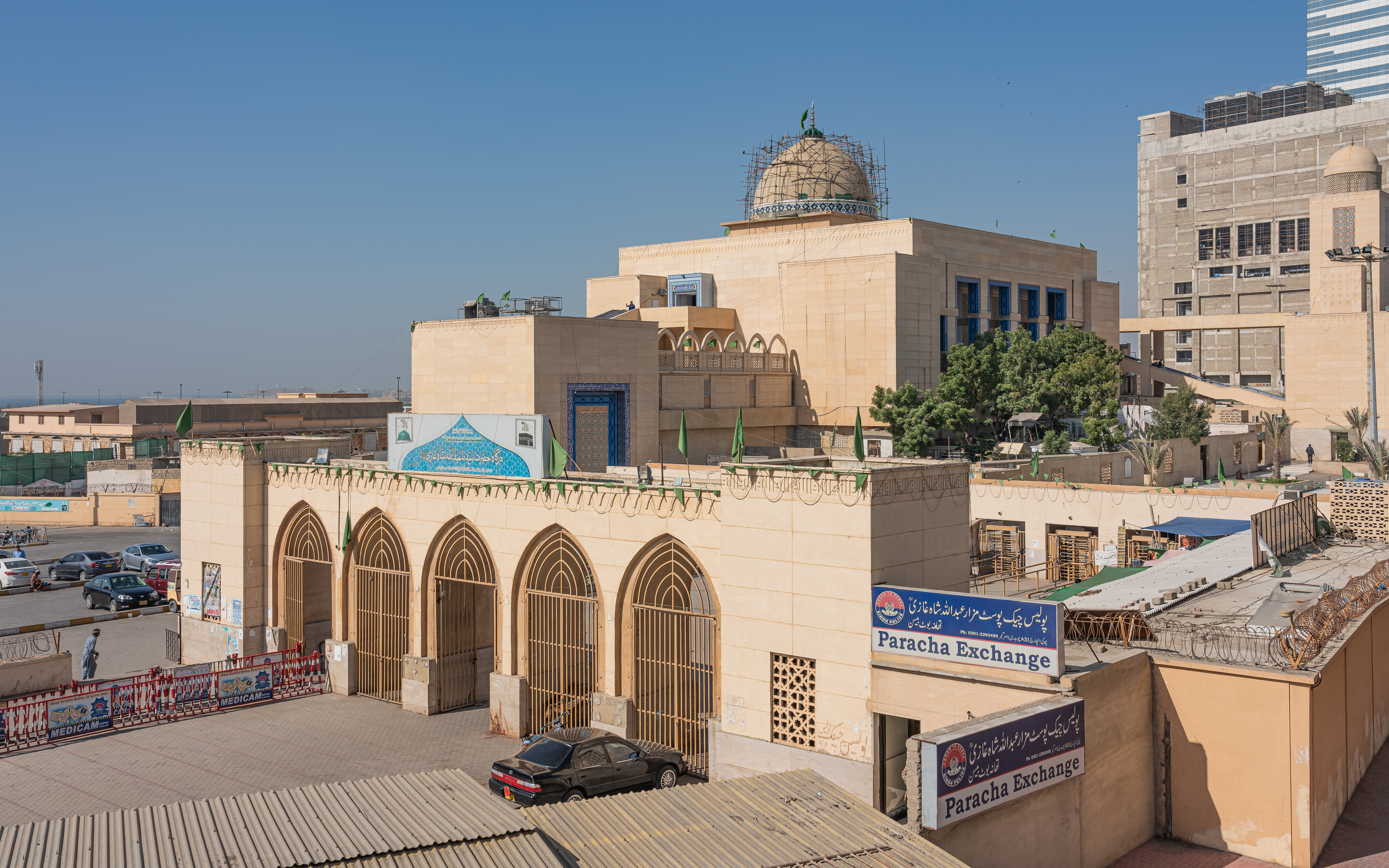
The shrine of Karachi's patron saint, Abdullah Shah Ghazi, is located in Clifton.

The area around Clifton was a largely barren seashore until British rule, and was previously known to locals as "Hawa Bandar", or "Wind Port". Prior to the establishment of the area as a suburb of Karachi, Clifton's shoreline had been home to a shrine of 8th century Abdullah Shah Ghazi - widely regarded as the city's patron saint. The shrine is immediately adjacent to the historic Sri Ratneswar Mahadev Hindu Temple.

Clifton was initially developed in the late 19th century under British colonial rule, and initially served as the location for homes belonging to the city's British elite as an escape from the city. In the early 20th century, Parsis from nearby Iran began moving to the area, and were soon followed by Muslims and Hindus. The Jehangir Kothari Parade, bestowed to the city by Parsi businessman Seth Jehangir Hormusji Kothari, was built in Clifton in 1919–20. The Mohatta Palace was built in Clifton in 1927 by a wealthy Hindu businessman, and now serves as a museum. Clifton Bridge was built in the 1930s to connect the suburb to central Karachi. By the 1950s, camel owners began offering rides to local tourists on the beach. The area remained a residential area characterized by bungalows until the 1970s, when the area began to develop as one of Karachi's prime commercial and retail centres.

In 1973, Clifton's famous Three Sword monument In Block 9, Clifton was erected as part of a beautification programme launched by Prime Minister Zulfiqar Ali Bhutto, and was built in the shape of his political parties election symbol at the time. Despite a breakdown of law and order in Karachi in the 1980s and 1990s, Clifton was one of the localities in Karachi where real estate activity remained strong.

The government of Zulfiqar Ali Bhutto planned a casino in the area near the Clifton Beach in a bid to attract foreign tourists to Pakistan in the 70s. However, the idea was abandoned soon because of political issues and the structure lay empty for many decades until it was taken over by a local amusement parks company, who opened a themed entertainment center named "Sindbad" on it. This was also closed down in the early 2000s and after another bout of vacancy, the place was finally torn down and the Dolmen Mall was erected in its place. This mall is now one of Pakistan's premier shopping malls, housing local and many foreign brands like Debenham's.

The areas also houses the former residence of Zulfiqar Ali Bhutto and the current residence of Bilawal Bhutto Zardari and Asif Ali Zardari. Bilawal House, which is now the current residence of Bilawal Bhutto Zardari has been surrounded with controversy since the erection of a protective wall around the house, with many local politicians asking authorities to pull it down.

In 2018, a group of extremists attacked the Chinese consulate here. The extremists were killed and two police officers were also killed.

== Economy ==
Clifton is emerging as another Central Business District of Karachi along with Saddar Town the main Central Business District of Karachi. Today it headquarters the corporate office of Pakistan's largest energy company, Pakistan State Oil (PSO) as well several other large local and foreign companies such as Nestlé Pakistan Limited, Dolmen Group and Muller and Phipps among other corporate and regional offices. It also houses the headquarters of Institute of Chartered Accountants of Pakistan.

Increased business activity and real estate construction boom has resulted in Clifton altering the city skyline, with the two tallest buildings in Pakistan, the Bahria Icon Tower and the Ocean Towers located in Clifton.

The Karachi Eat Food Festival, which is Pakistan's biggest food festival, is held every year in Clifton. The festival started off back in 2016 and it has now become Pakistan's major culinary and restaurant event with 95+ stalls and major brand engagement. Many new restaurateurs and aspiring chefs try out their locally and internationally inspired dishes at the event. The event has been a major hit with young people with the event witnessing massive crowds on all three days of this festival. The KEF is organized in the early part of January each year.

Clifton itself is recognised as a fast food BBQ destination within Karachi which attracts locals as well as tourists who enjoy shopping walking on the seashore and dining in these restaurants which serve quality Halal foods on demand.

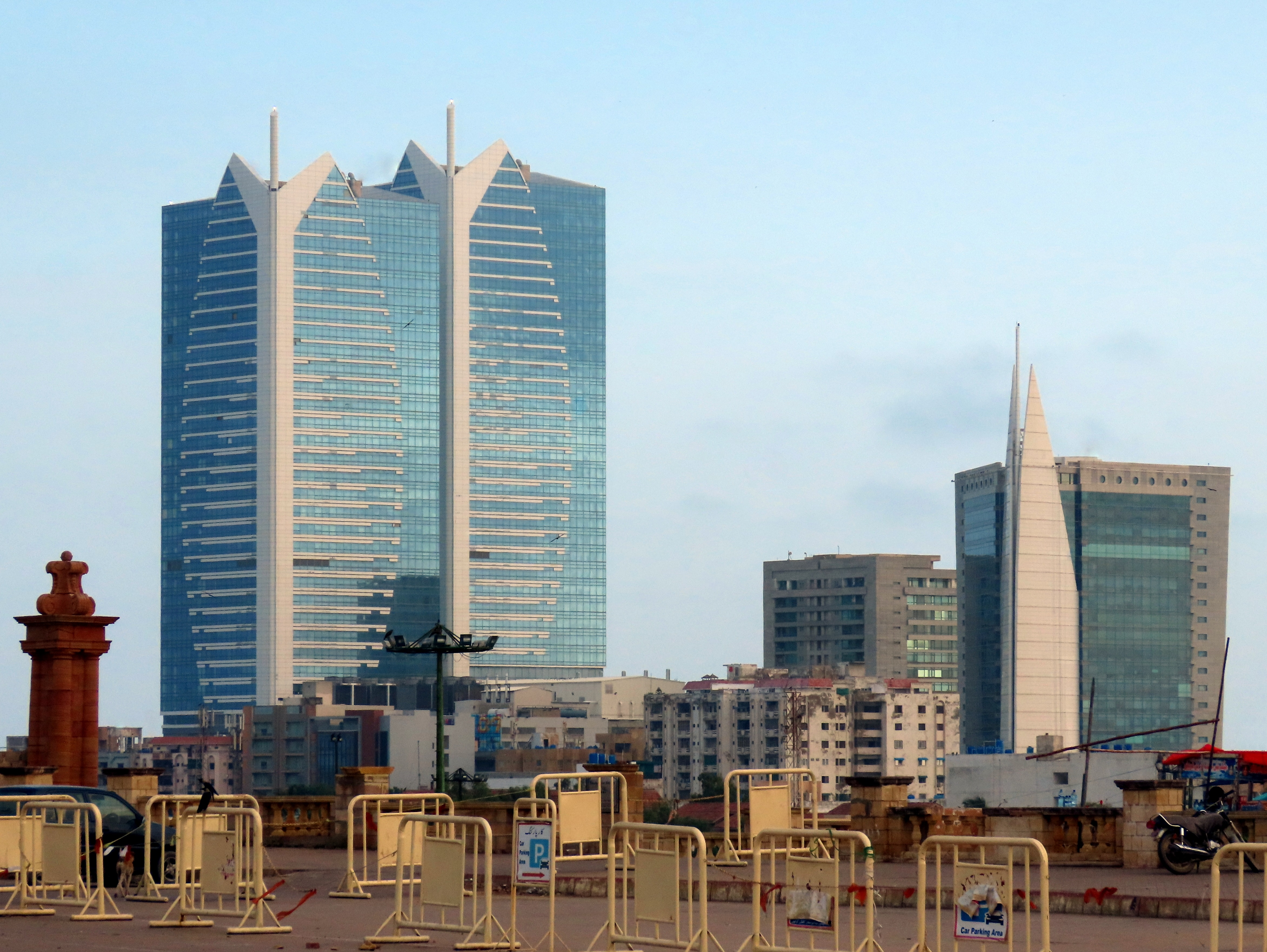
Dolmen City is a mixed-use development on the Clifton waterfront.

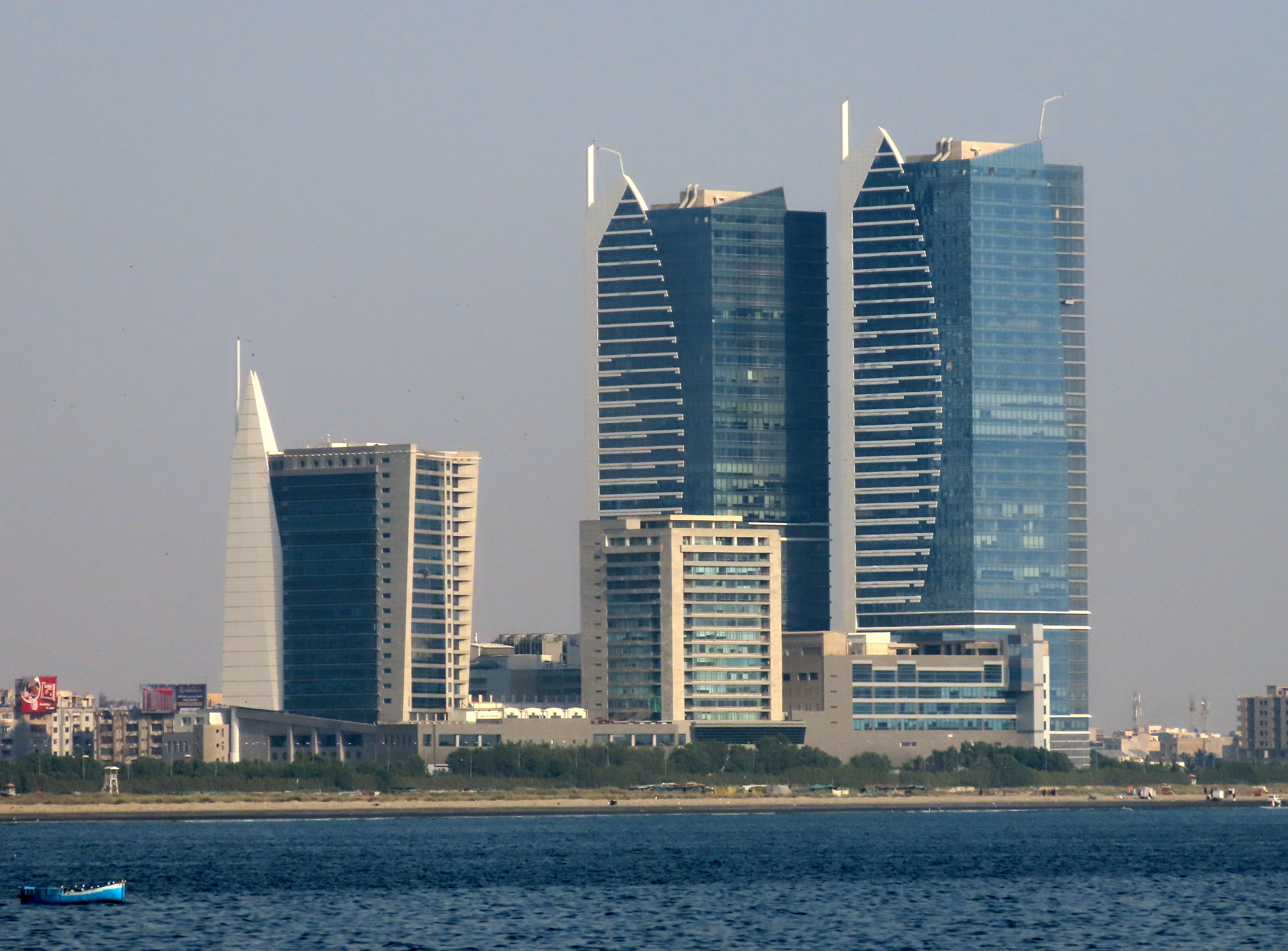
Another view of Dolmen

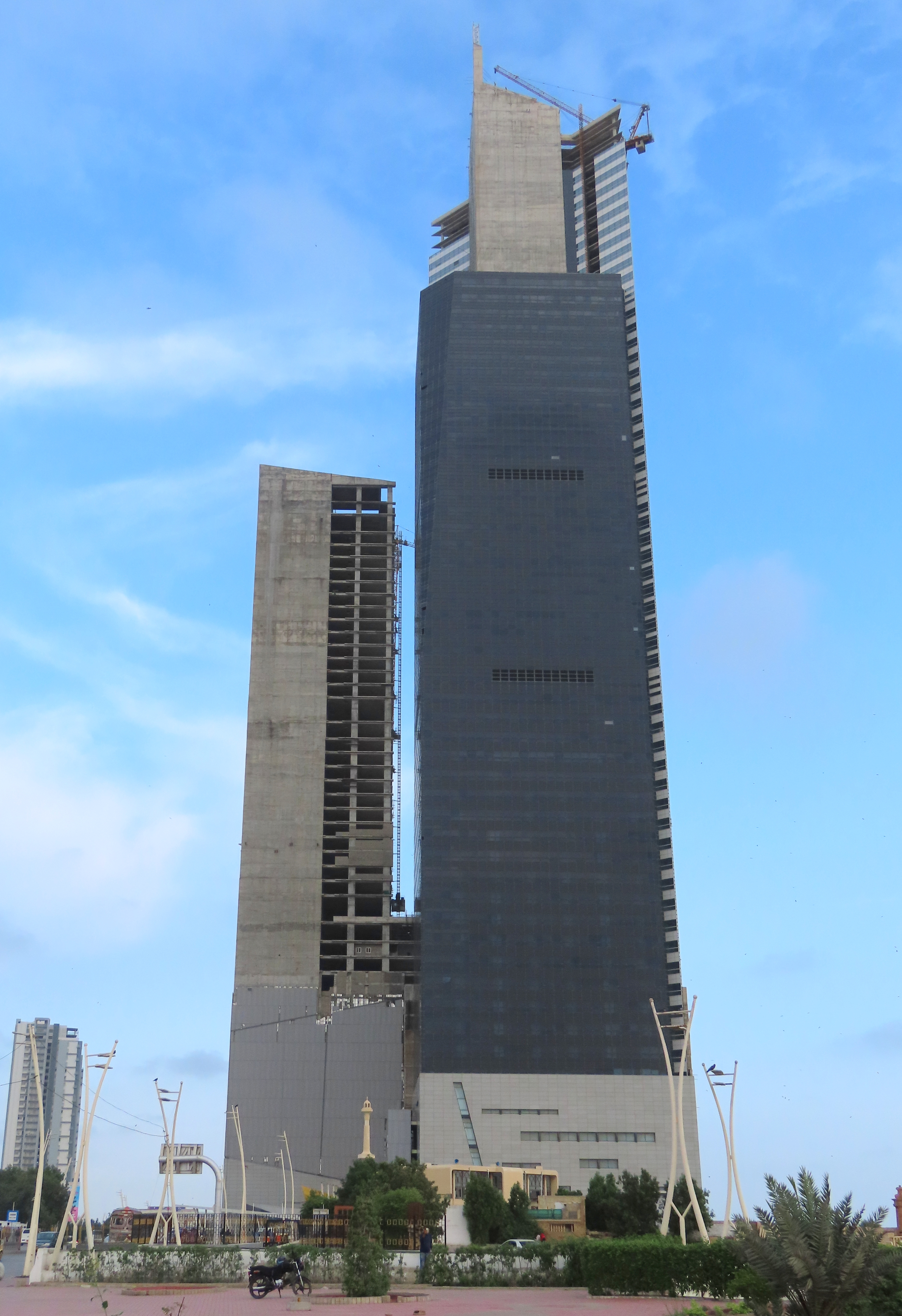
At a height of 300 metres (980 ft), Clifton's Bahria Icon Tower is the tallest skyscraper in Pakistan.

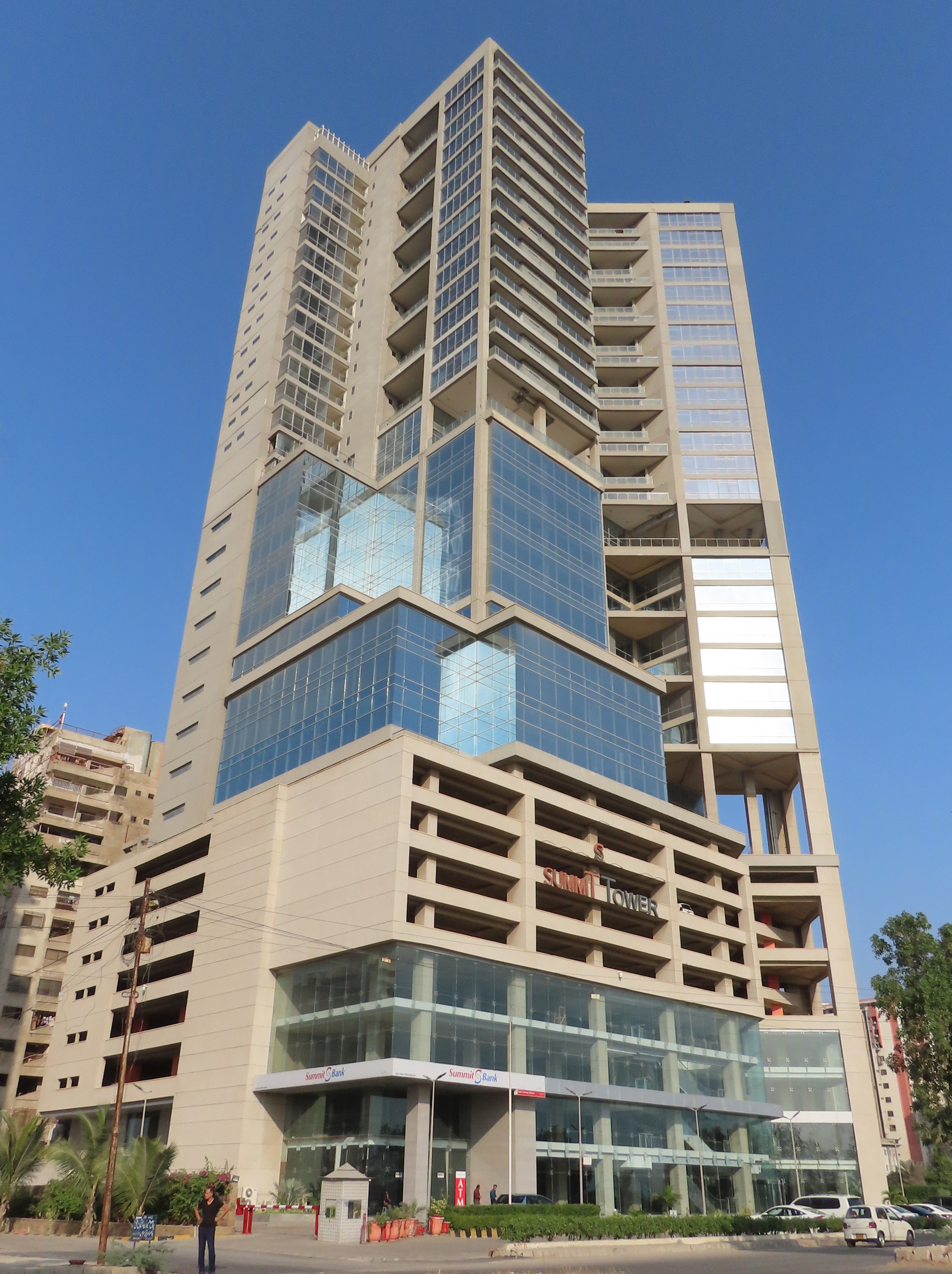
Clifton's beachfront has seen the construction of several skyscrapers begin since 2015.

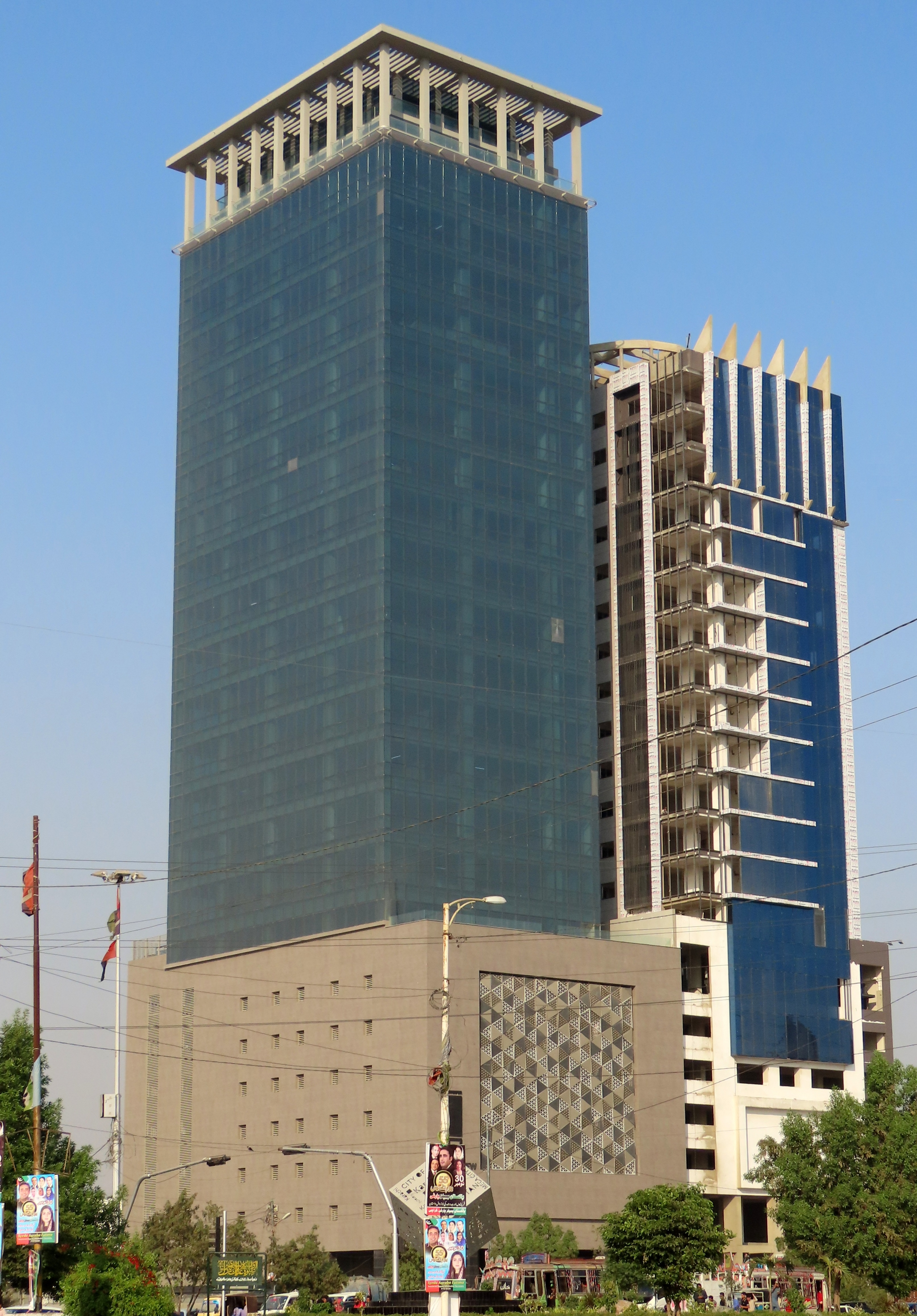
Marina View is located near Boat Basin Food Street.

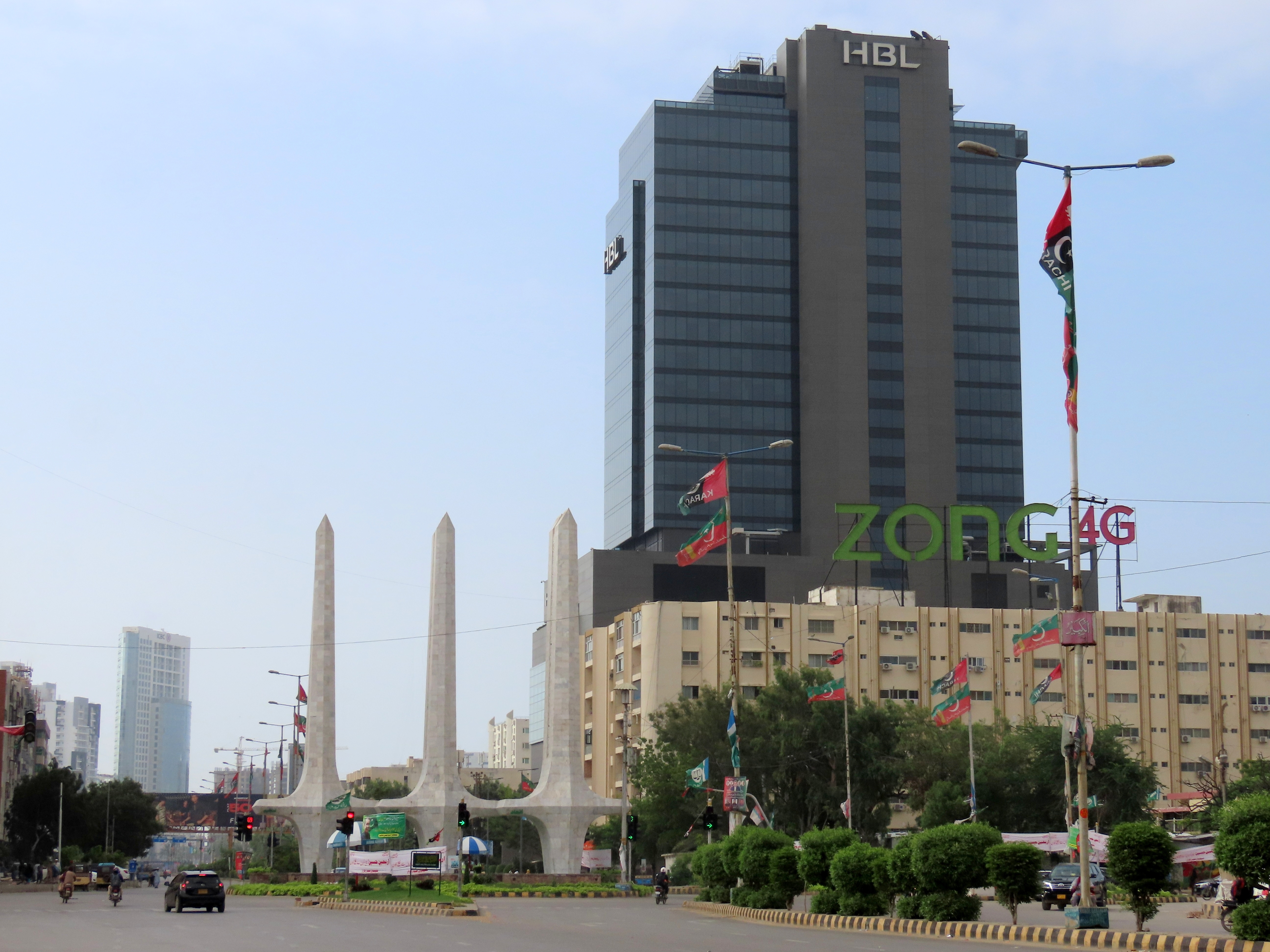
Teen Talwar is a major intersection in Clifton.

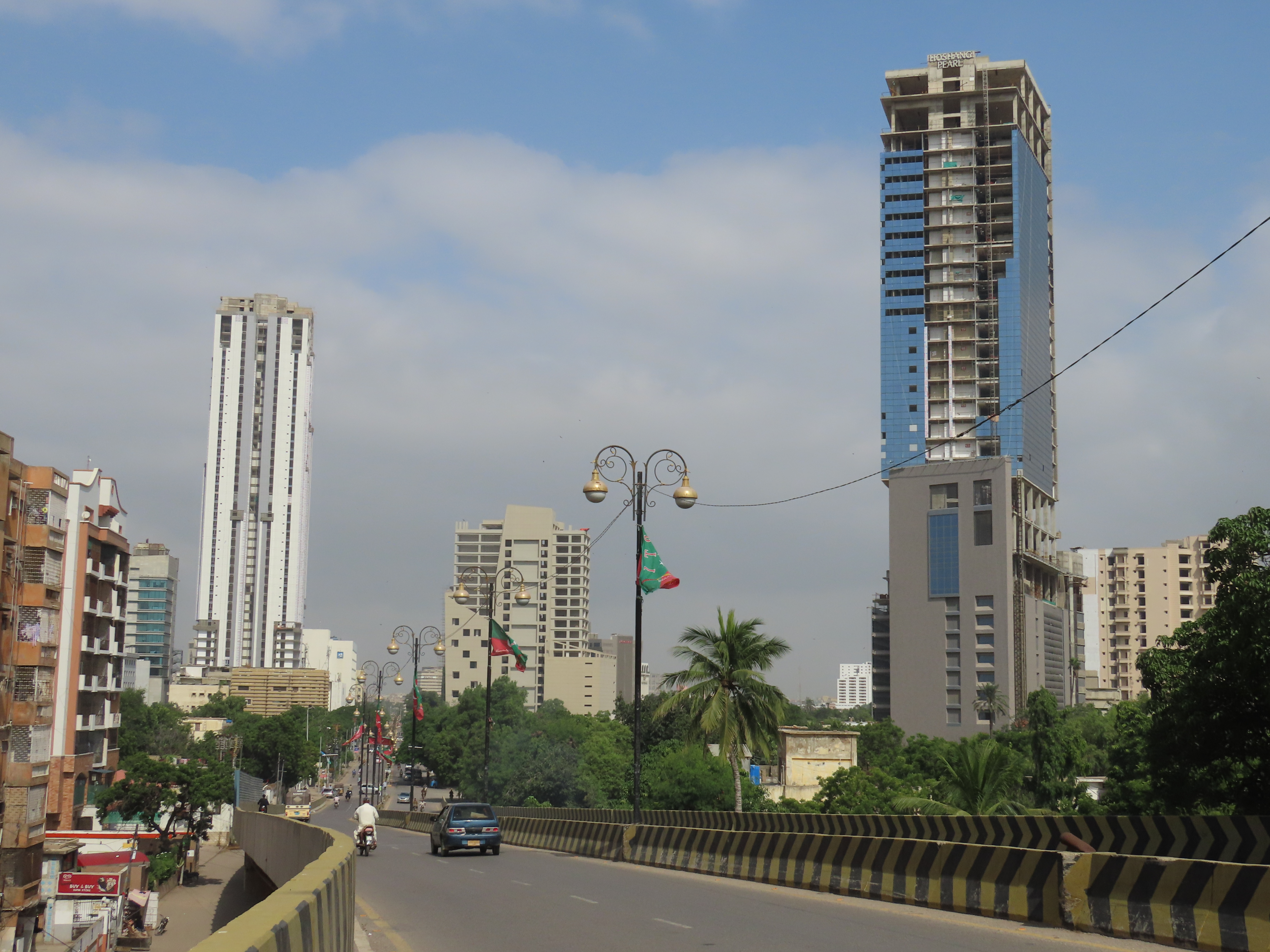
Highrises in Clifton

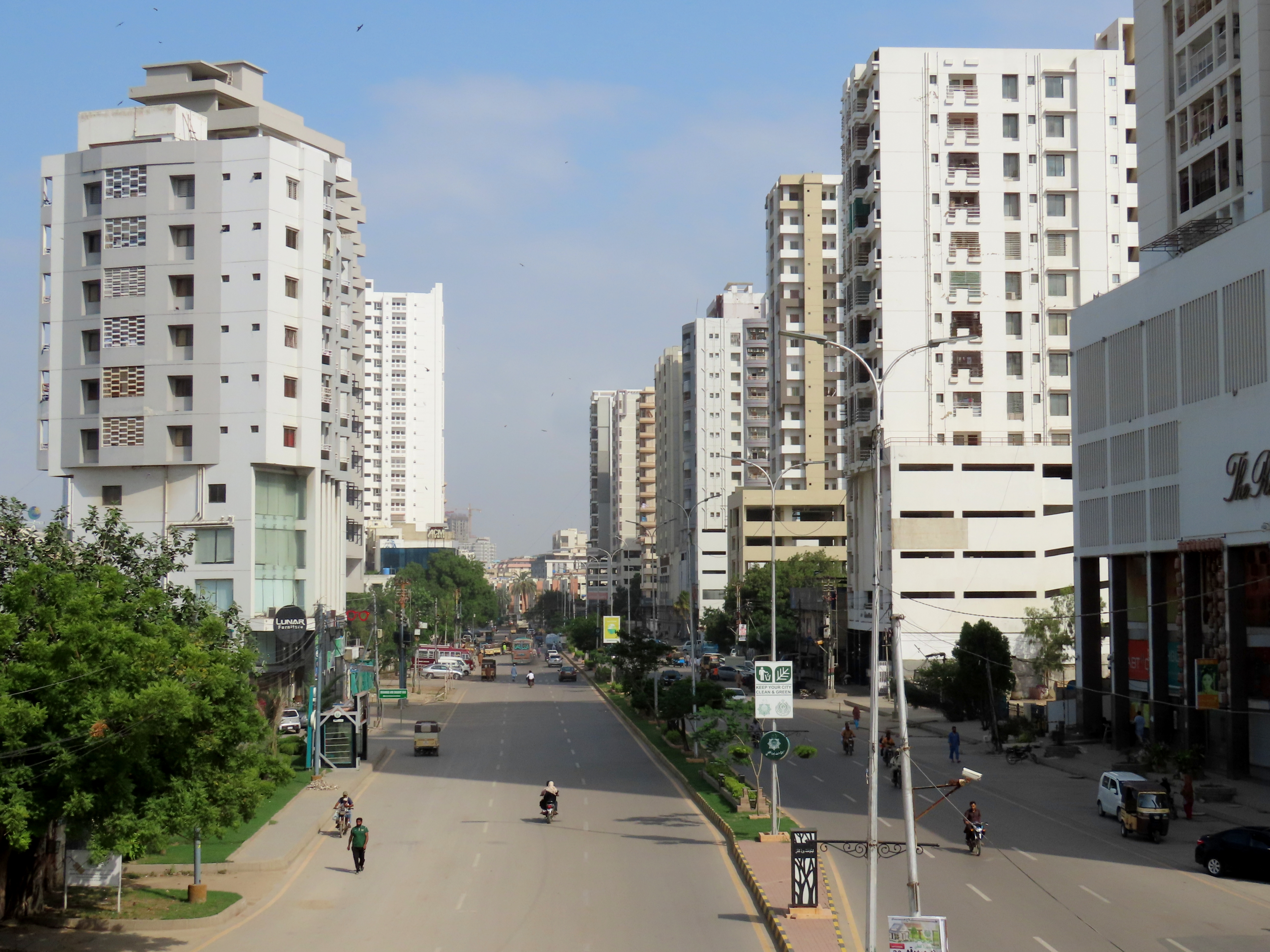
Highrises in Clifton

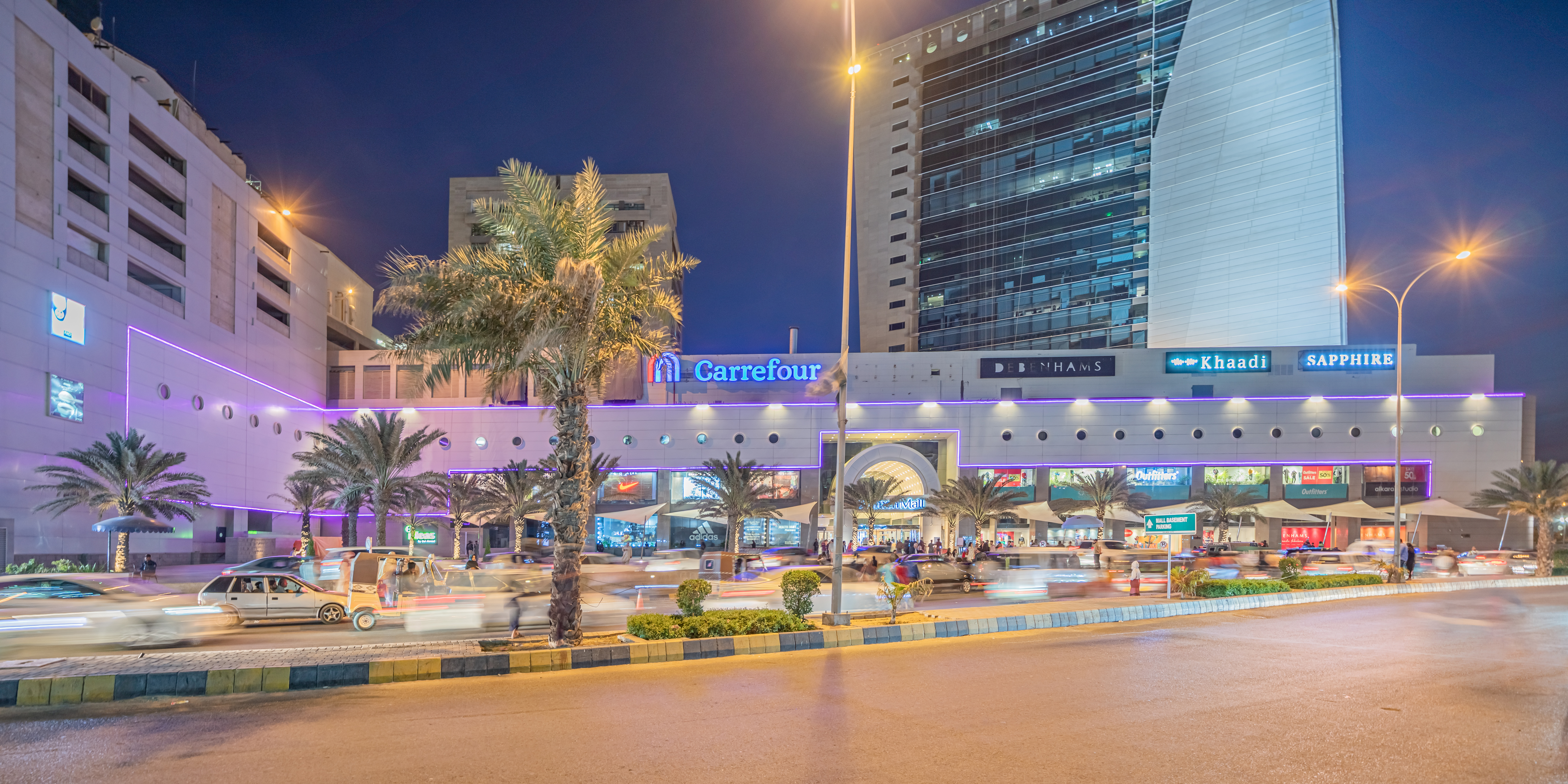
Dolmen Mall is a popular shopping center with several international outlets.

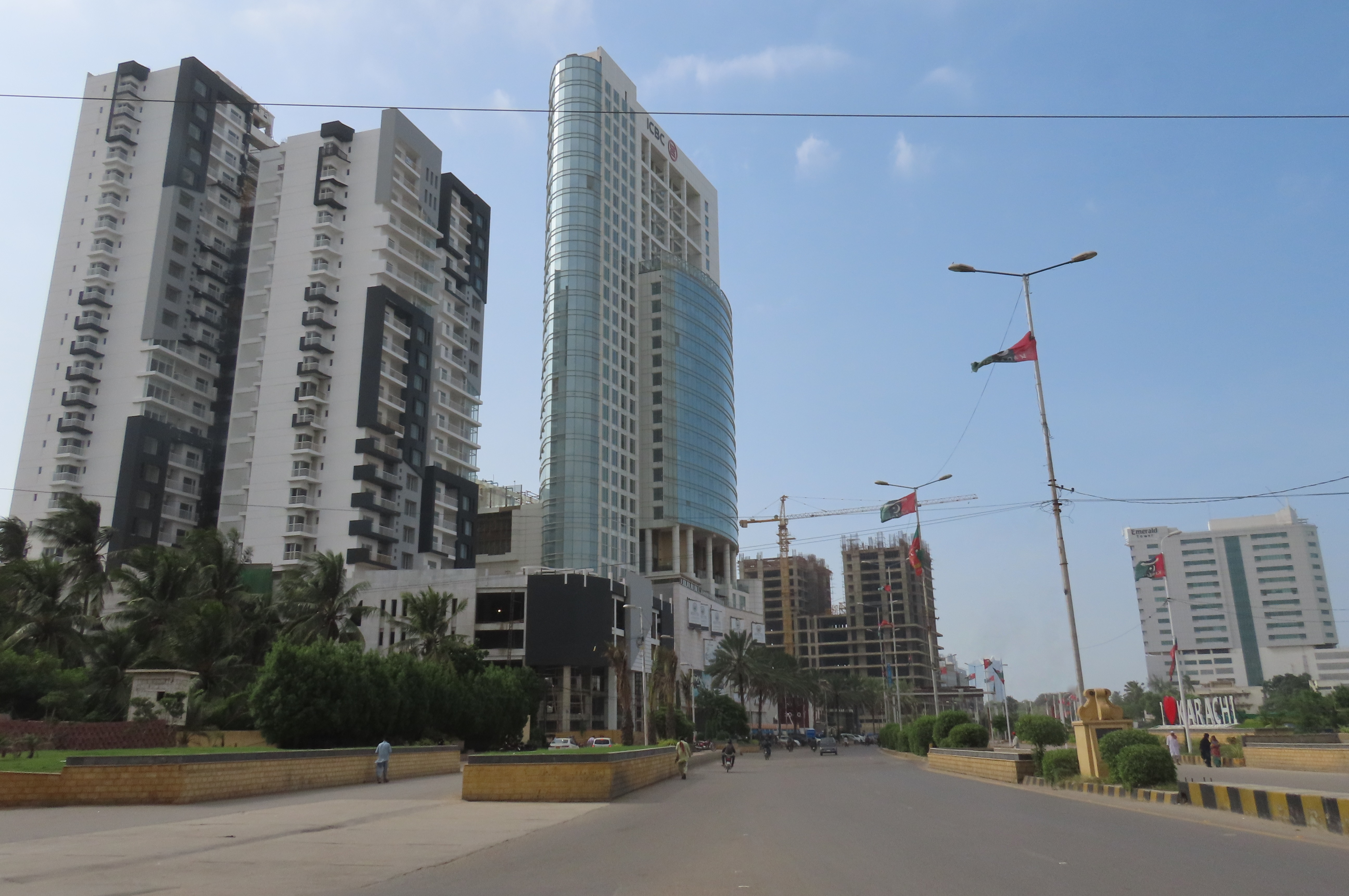
Ocean Tower

== Foreign missions ==
There are also several international consulates and high commission offices based in Clifton such as British Deputy High Commission, The Chinese consulate, The Italian Consulate, The Russian Consulate The Iranian Consulate, Consulate General of Switzerland as well as the Kuwaiti consulate among others.

== Educational institutions ==
- Indus Valley School of Art and Architecture
- The Lyceum School
- Karachi Grammar School
- Convent of Jesus and Mary, Karachi
- Karachi Grammar School maintains its Kindergarten, Junior and College sections in Clifton.
- SZABIST is located in Clifton.
- Head Start School System also operates its biggest branch Clifton Campus in Clifton area.

== Visitor attractions ==
- Bagh-e-Ibne Qasim
- Bahria Icon Tower, Pakistan's tallest building
- Boat Basin Park
- Clifton beach
- Clifton Urban Forest
- Dolmen Mall Clifton
- Jehangir Kothari Parade (1922), along with the Katrak Bandstand and Lady Lloyd Pier. The pier enabled people to walk over the sea, but over the years the sea has retreated.
- Mohatta Palace was the last home of sisters Fatima Jinnah and Shireen Jinnah. It is now a museum.
- Sri Ratneswar Mahadev Temple
- Shrine of Abdullah Shah Ghazi
- Teen Talwar
- World's second highest water jet fountain lies in the Arabian Sea near the Clifton Coastline
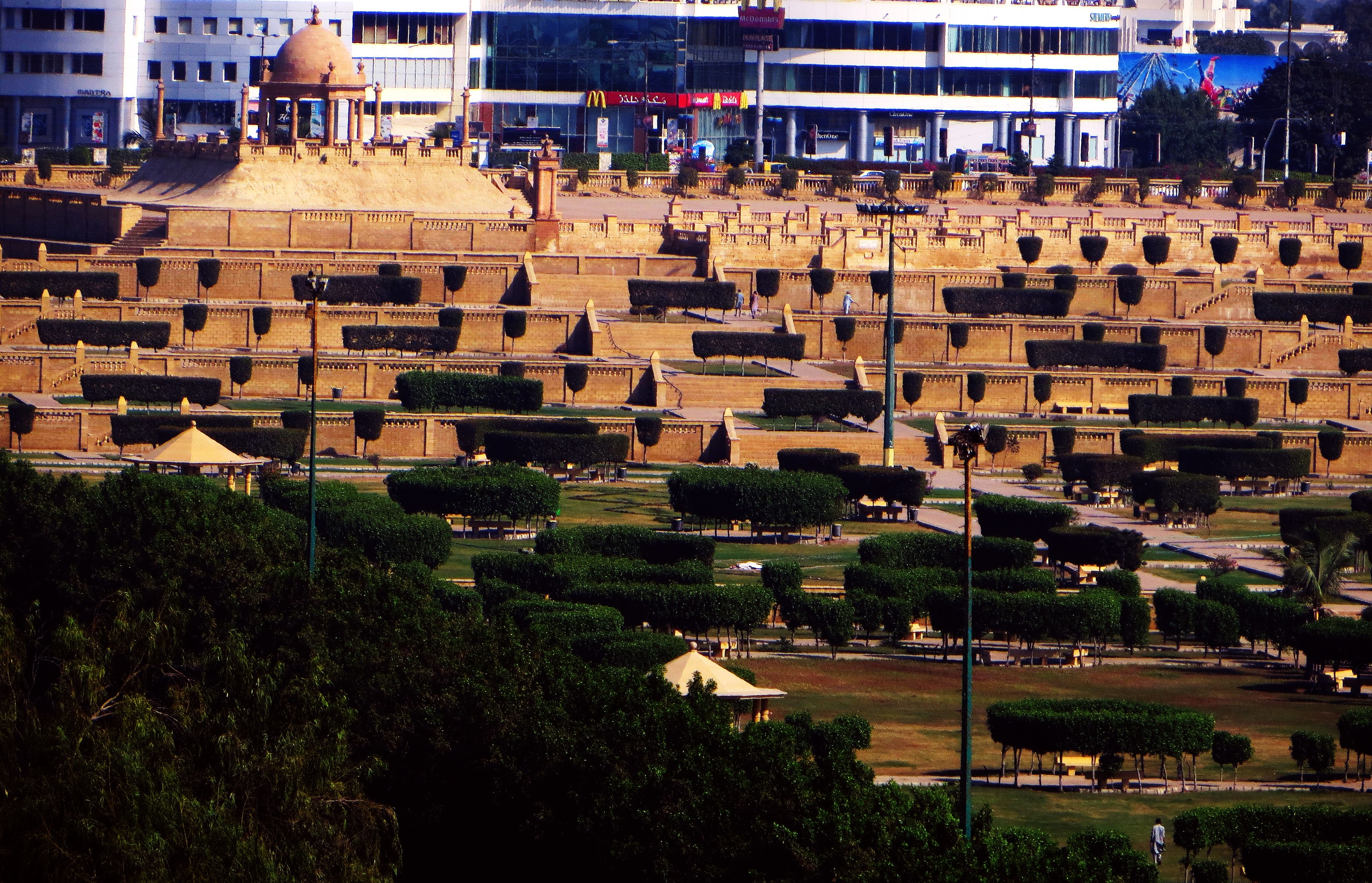
  Bagh Ibne Qasim, restored in 2017
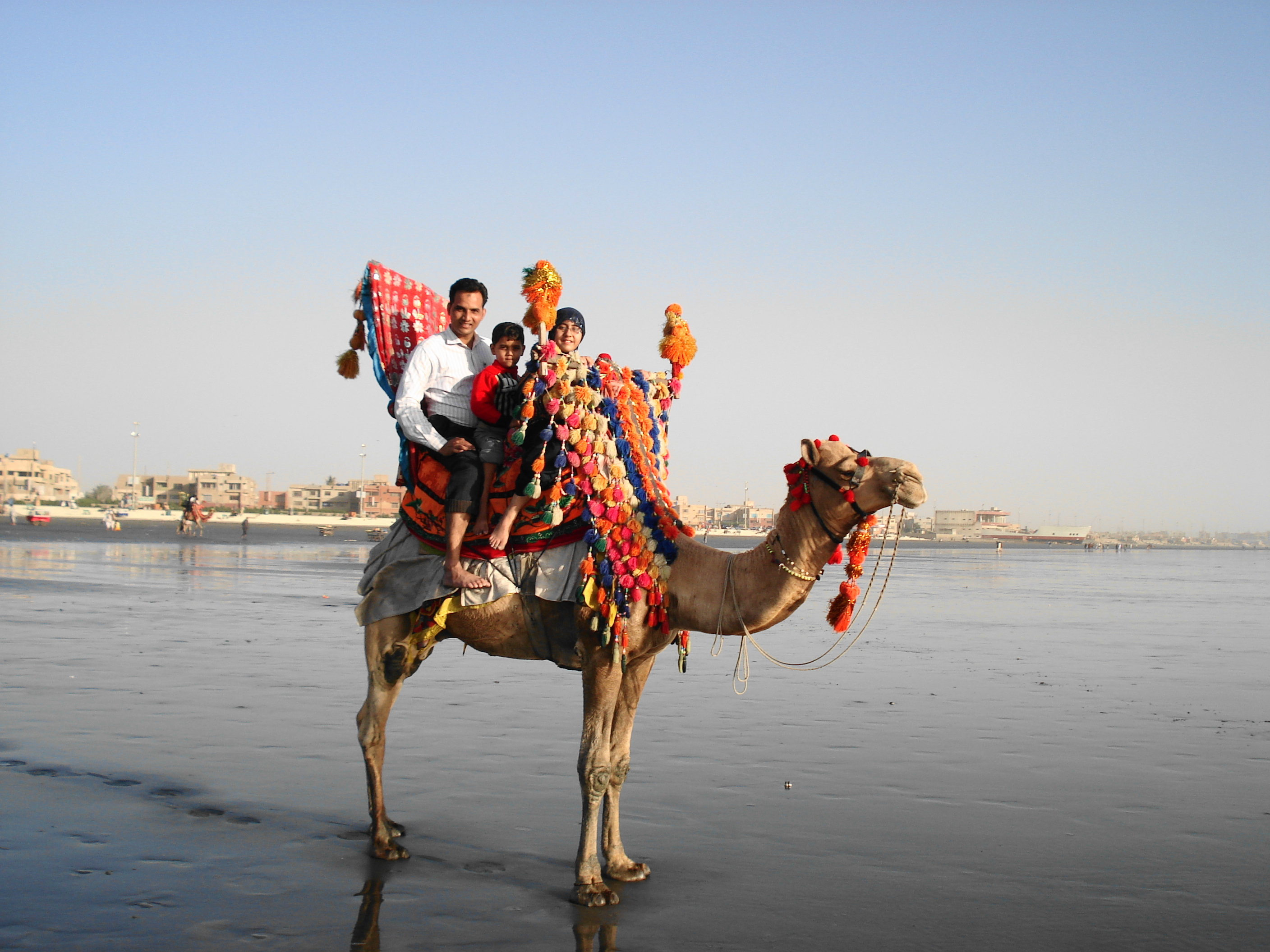
  Camel rides along Clifton Beach are a popular activity.
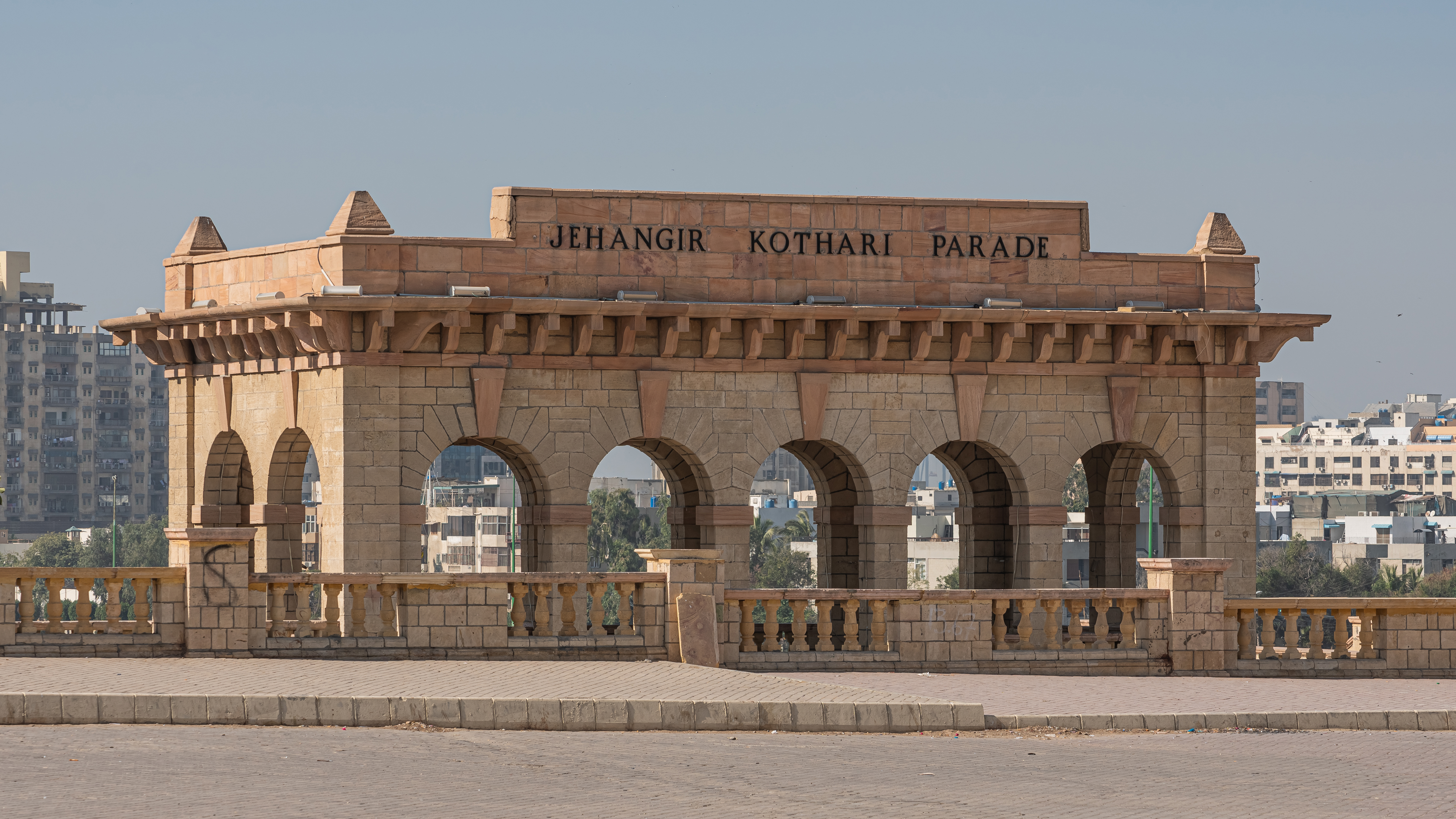
  Jehangir Kothari Parade
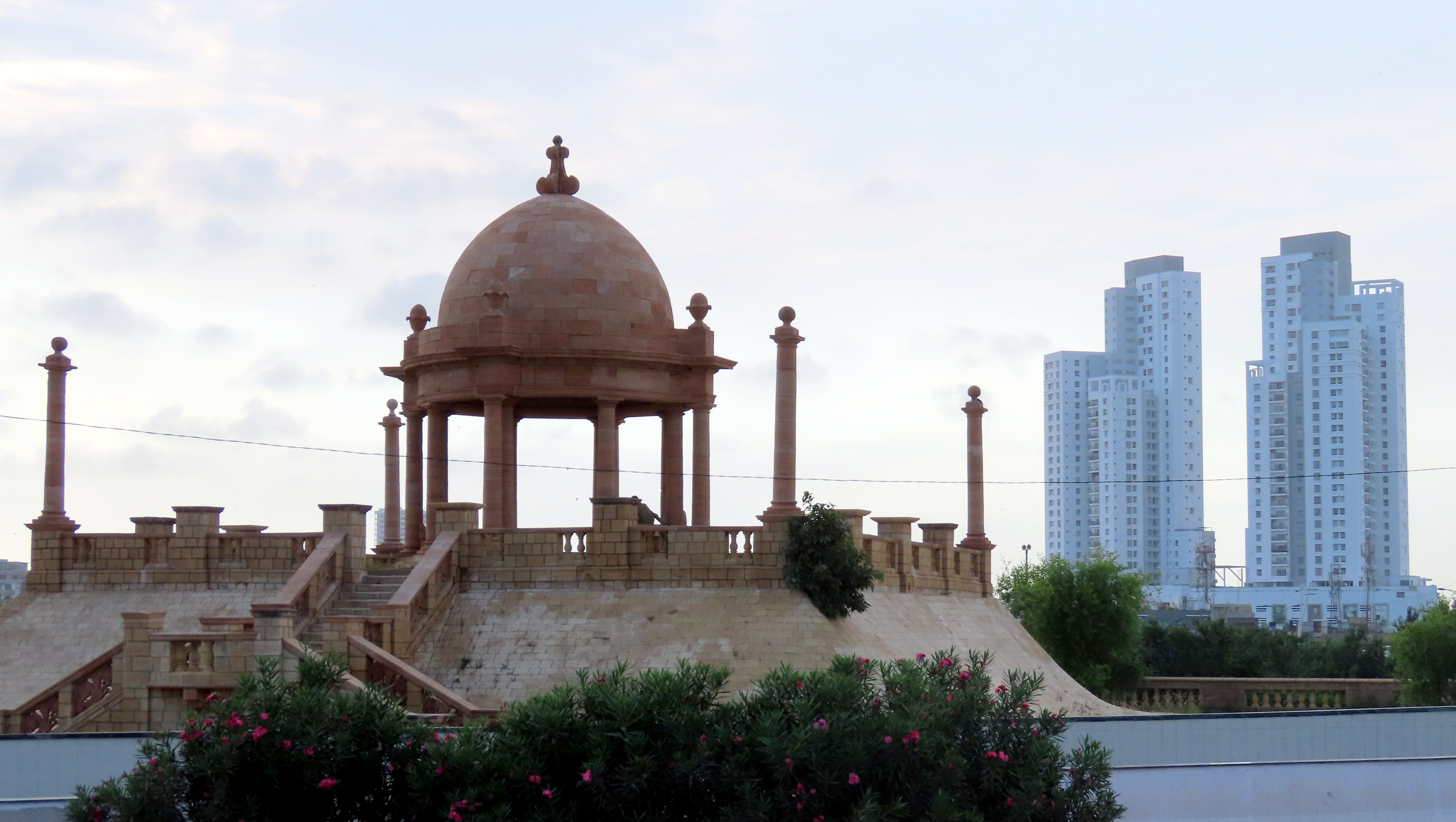
  Katrak Bandstand at the Jehangir Kothari Parade
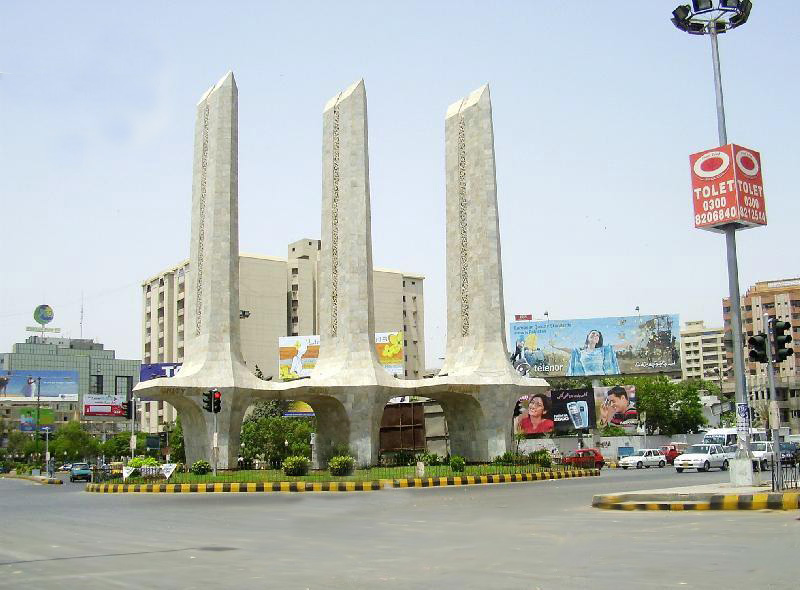
  Teen Talwar junction
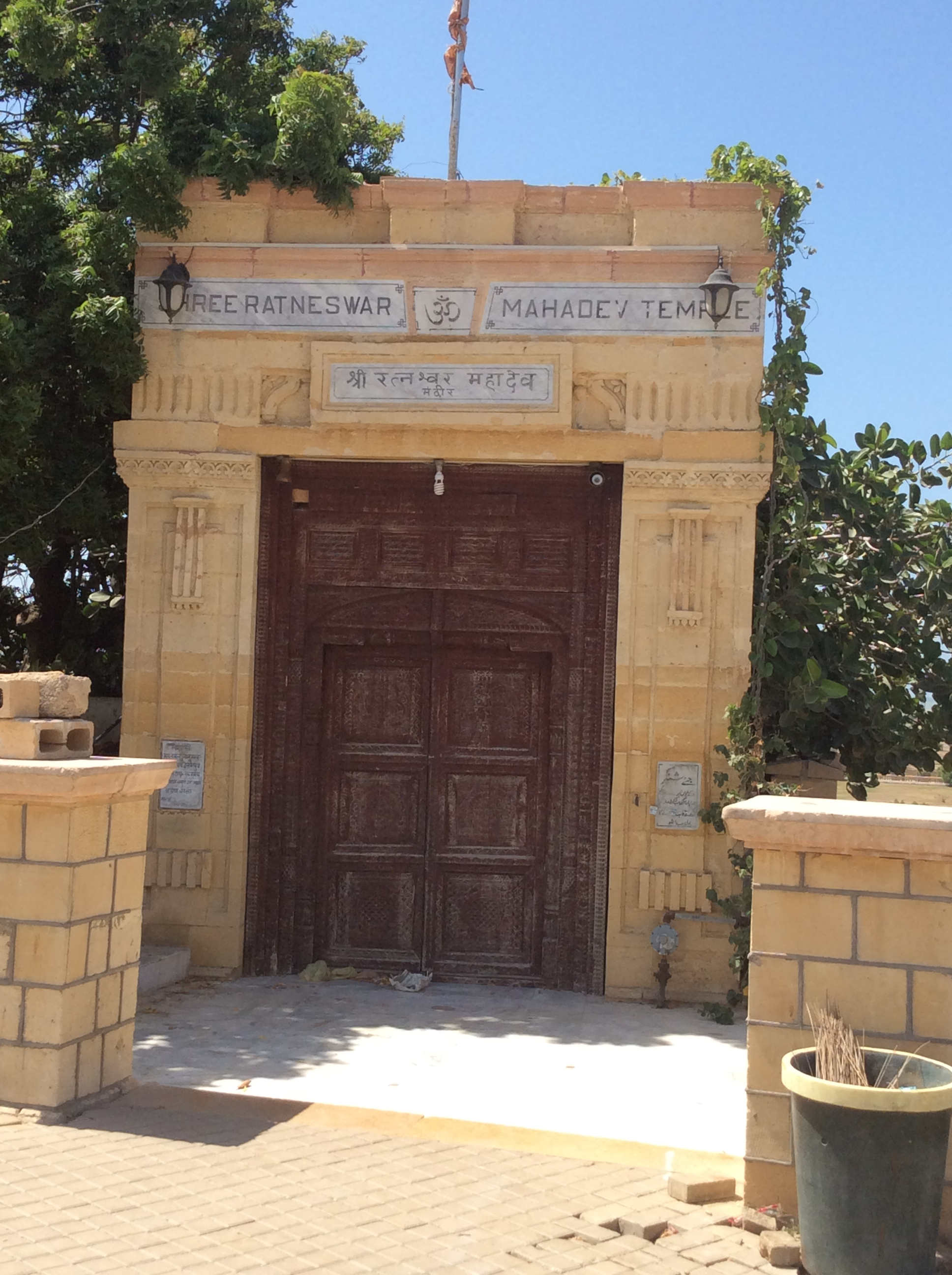
  Ratneshwar Mahadev Temple

== See also ==
- Clifton Beach, Karachi
- Seaview
- Clifton Cantonment
- Shah Rasool Colony
- Chinese community in Pakistan
