= Clifton Beach, Karachi =

Beach in Karachi, Sindh, Pakistan

Clifton Beach Sea View
- Beach
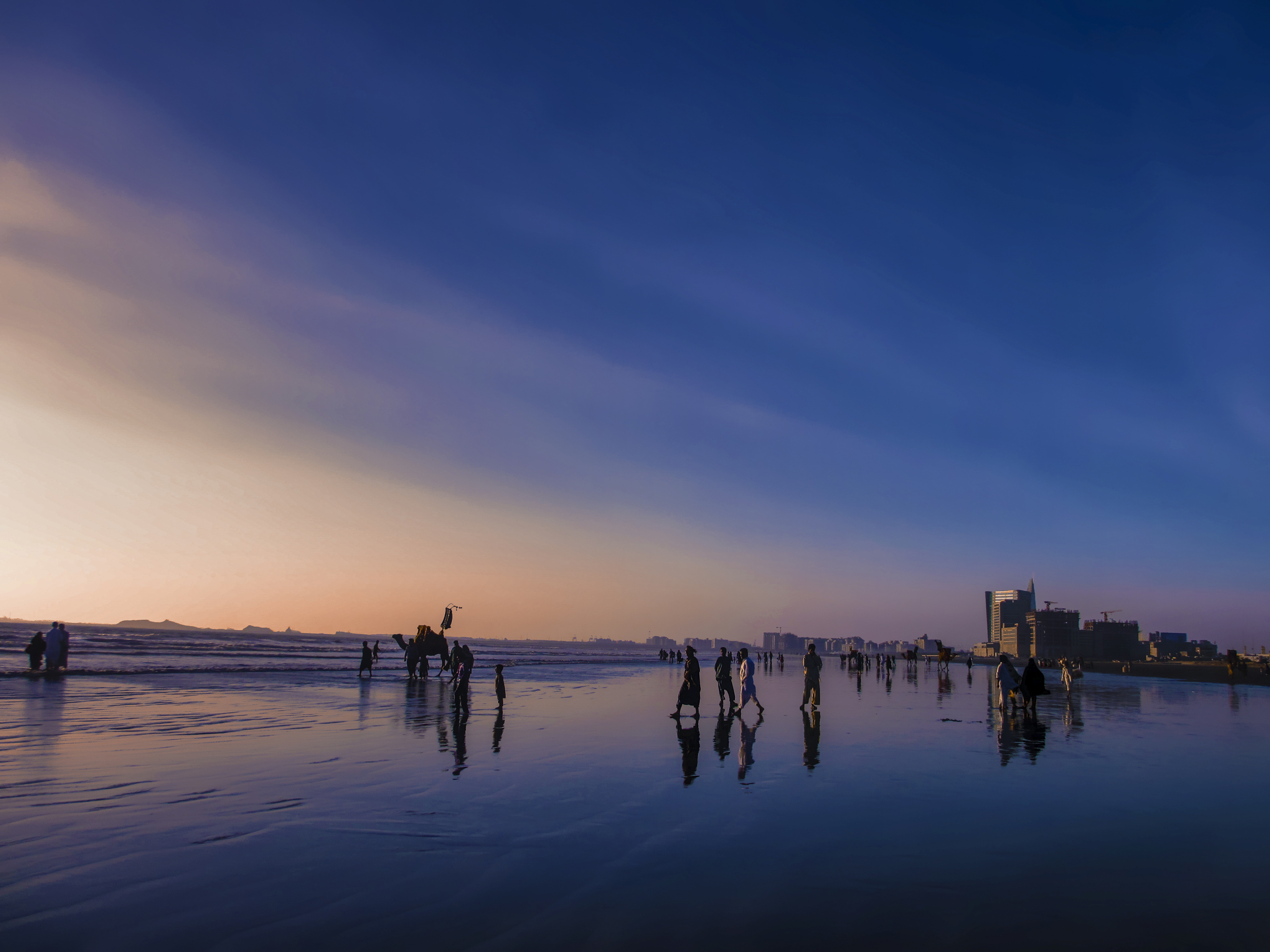
- Clifton Beach, Karachi
- Interactive map of Clifton Beach
- Coordinates: 24.78°N 67.04°E
- Location: Clifton; Karachi; Pakistan
- Formed by: Natural

Clifton Beach, also known as Sea View, is a beach in Karachi, Sindh, Pakistan and is located on the Arabian Sea. It stretches from Karachi to Ormara (Balochistan). The beach is very popular in Pakistan. It is open 24/7 for the general public.

Karachi is the most prominent coastal city of Pakistan and visitors have many opportunities to visit different beaches bordering the Arabian Sea.

In recent times, the area surrounding the beach has seen massive commercial activity as it is located in one of the most sought after localities in Karachi. The beach offers multiple leisure activities including camel rides, buggy rides, horse rides, and plastic plane flying, among others. Across from the beach is the Seaview Apartments, a gated residential area.

== Restaurants and entertainment ==
Previously, Clifton Beach had only had a few small shops known as "Corniche Points", where visitors could buy things like mineral water, samosas, chai and other foodstuffs.

Now, Clifton Beach offers a variety of restaurants, including a McDonald's, and has a multitude of vendors that entertain visitors.

Clifton Beach offers family entertainment including camel rides, horse rides, and motorized buggy rides to the visitors.

== Events ==
Clifton Beach is one of Karachi's major tourist attractions so most notable celebrations are celebrated here. A major event of the year is the New Year's celebration on the eve of 31 December each year. The Pakistan Air Force now holds regular shows on Clifton Beach on important national events. These air shows consist of planes from the PAF showing acrobatics and flypasts to the audiences. The beach is also a prime location for private concerts, musical festivals, Sindhi Cultural day celebrations as well as Holi celebrations and much more.

== Attempts at beautification and uplift ==
In 2003 it was noted that historic sites were deteriorating because of government neglect and lack of sanitation facilities for tourists. The monuments at risk included Lady Lloyd Pier, Jehangir Kothari Pavilion and his bungalow, Jehangir Kothari Parade, and the Katrak bandstand. In 2005, Clifton Beach Park was opened as part of the renovation of the historic Kothari Parade and Bagh Ibn-i-Qasim. In recent times, the local government and civil society has tried to make the place beautiful and tourist-friendly again. Attempts include the installation of themed dustbins in the shape of Giant Fish and cleanup campaigns by local civil society members. There have also been a few urban forests such as Clifton Urban Forest planted to improve the conditions and beauty of the area.

== Background ==
Clifton Beach is considered the most popular beach in Karachi. It was affected by an oil spill in 2003. A wreckage and cargo of dhow caused the oil spill and polluted the beach; the crew members of the wrecked dhow were rescued by the Pakistan Maritime Security Agency. The beach was closed for three days for removal of hay bales and cargo wreckage in the water. In 2005, the beach was revamped and upgraded.

== Gallery ==
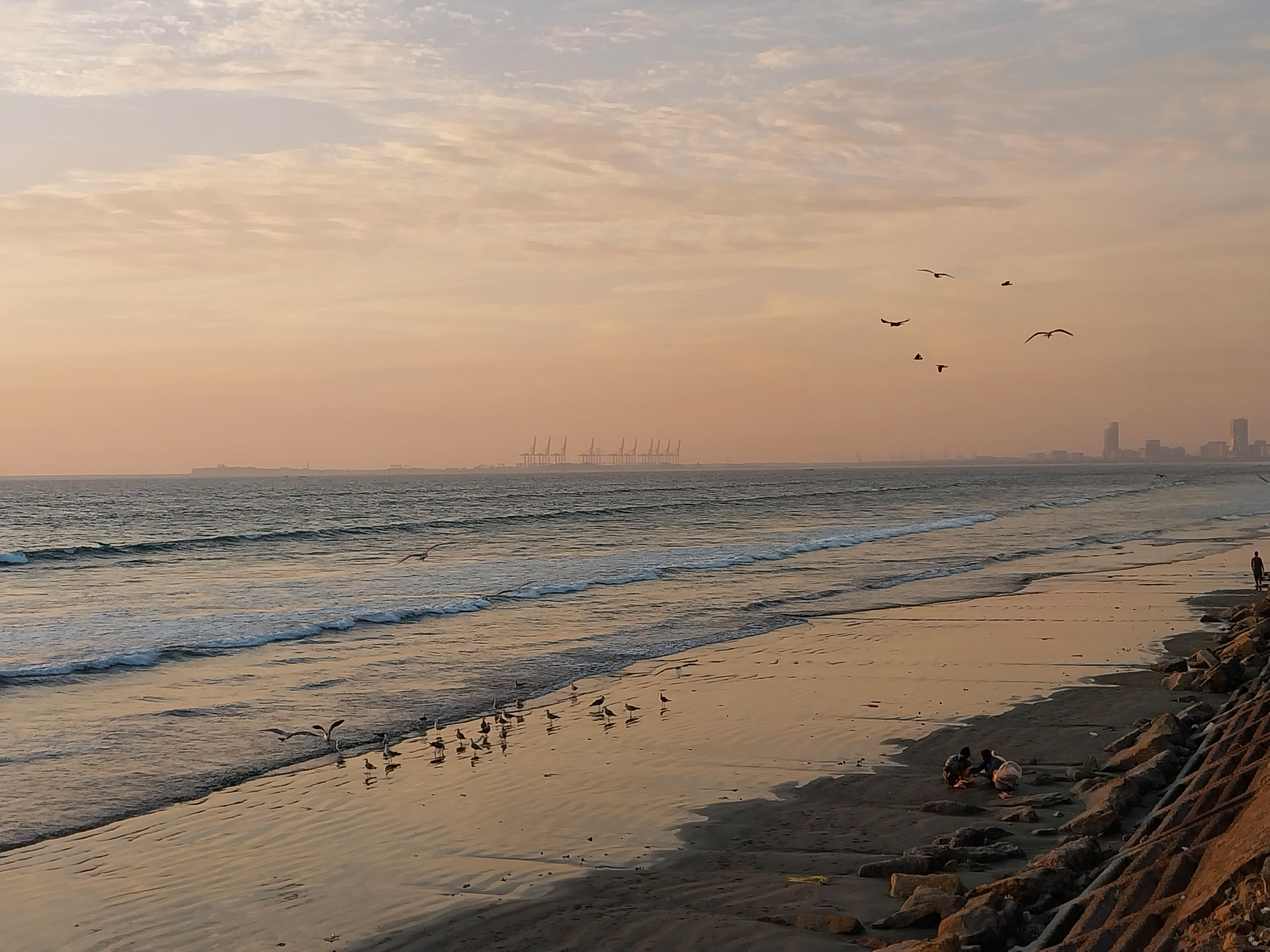
Seaview in the evening.

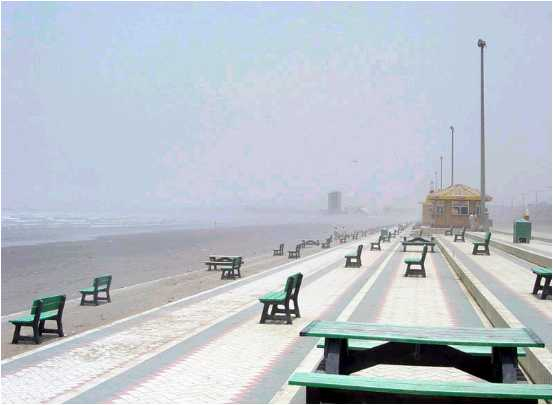
A view of Clifton Beach, Karachi.

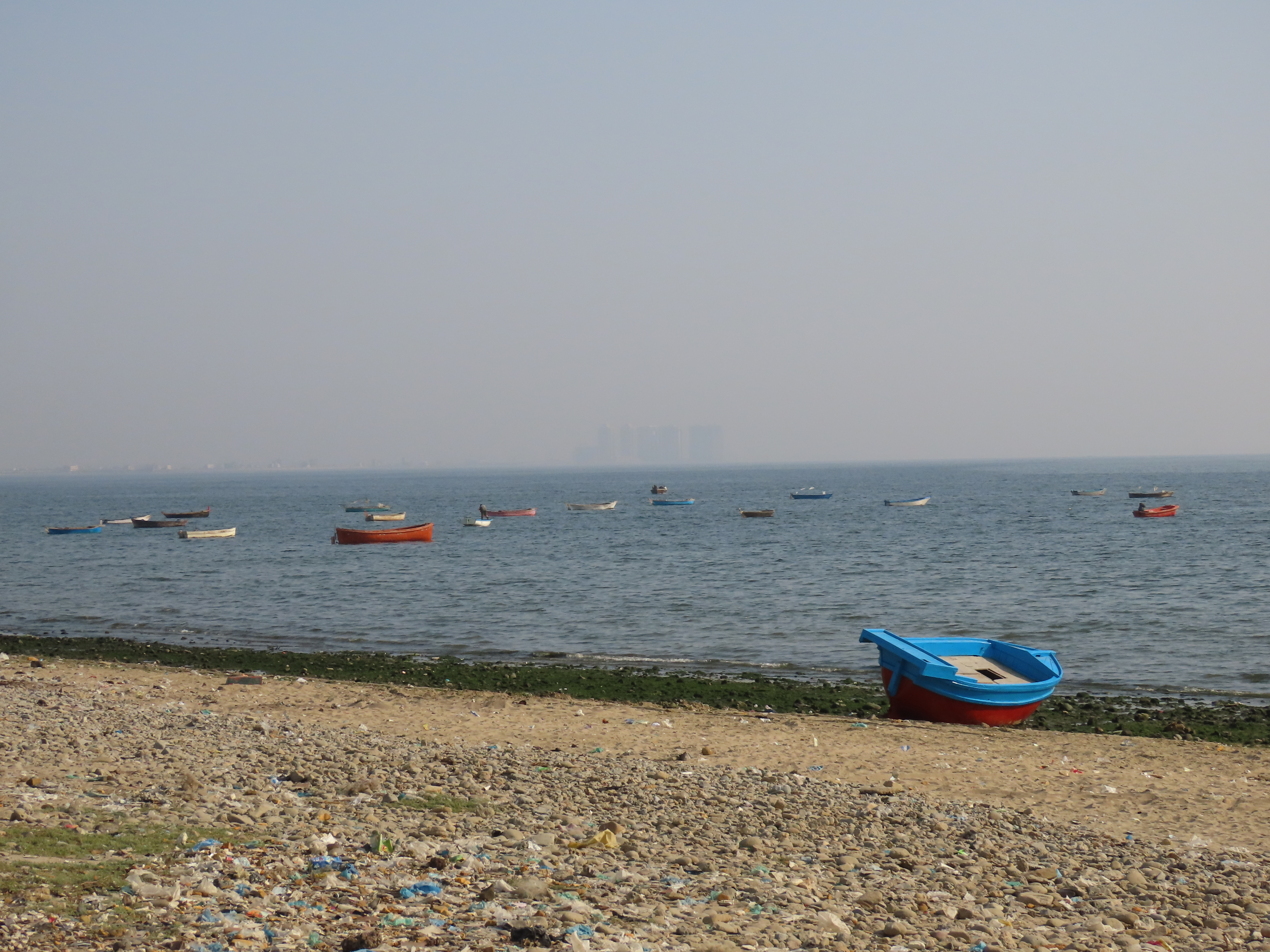
Seaview Boats

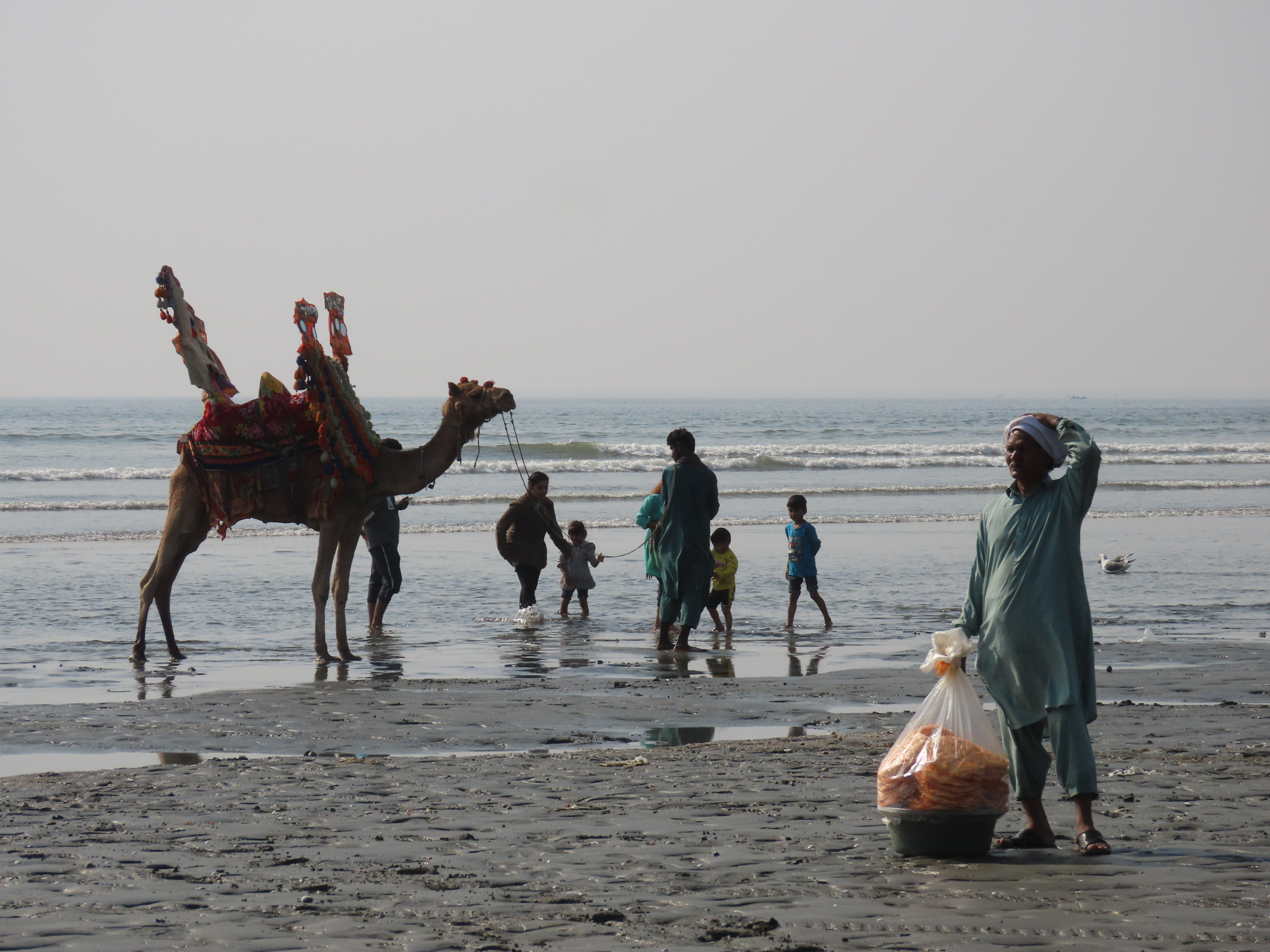
Seaview is crowded even in the afternoon

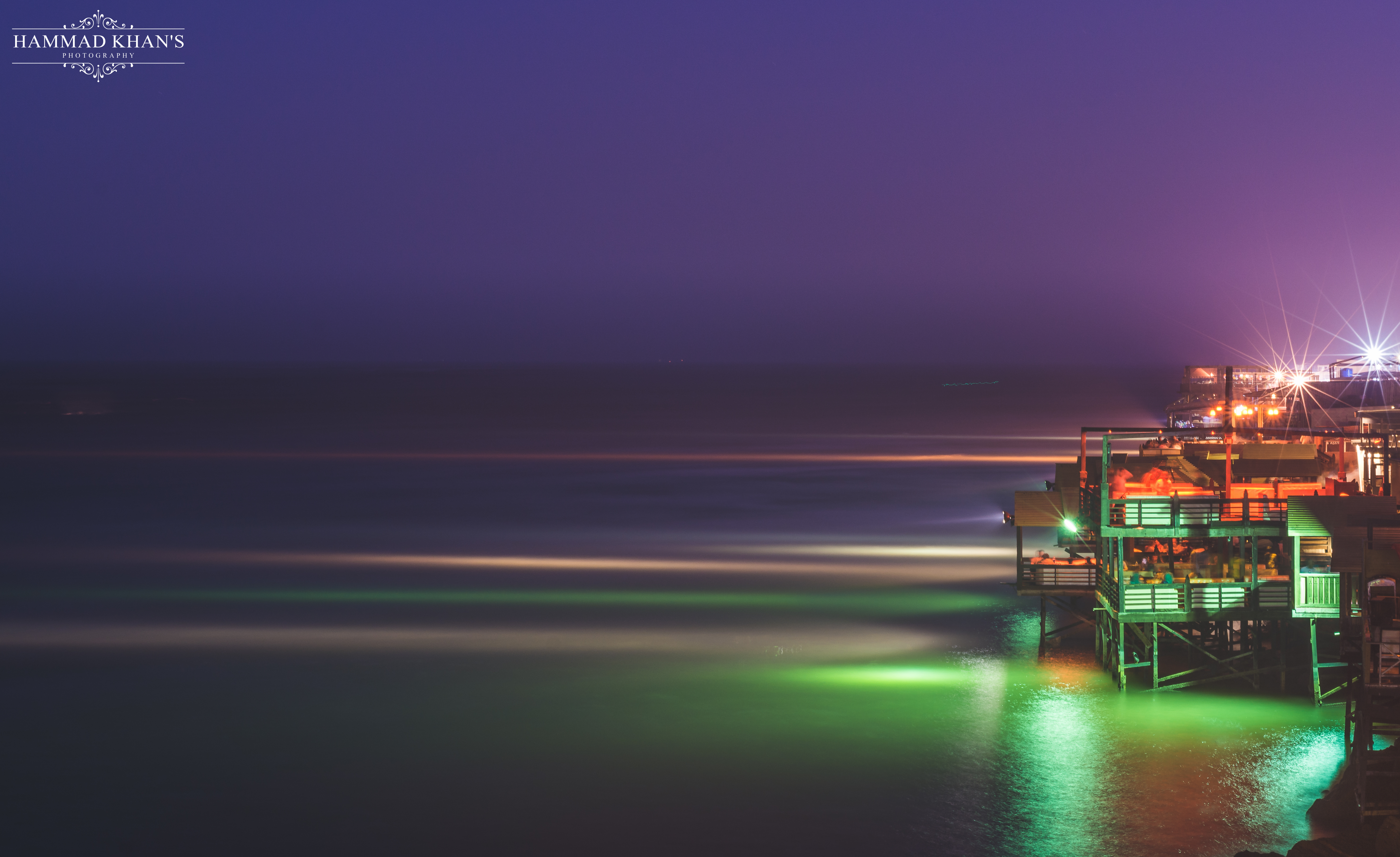
A view of Restaurants at Do Darya Karachi

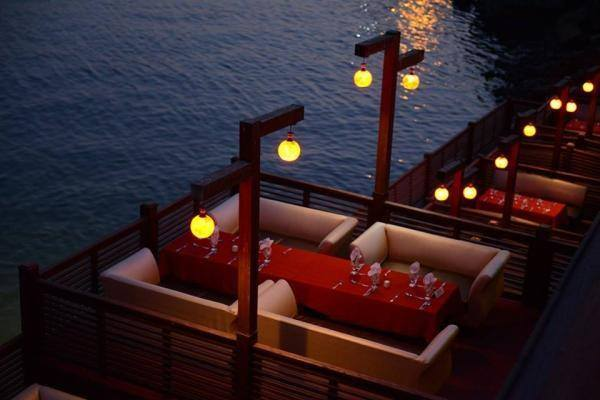
A view of Restaurants at Do Darya Karachi

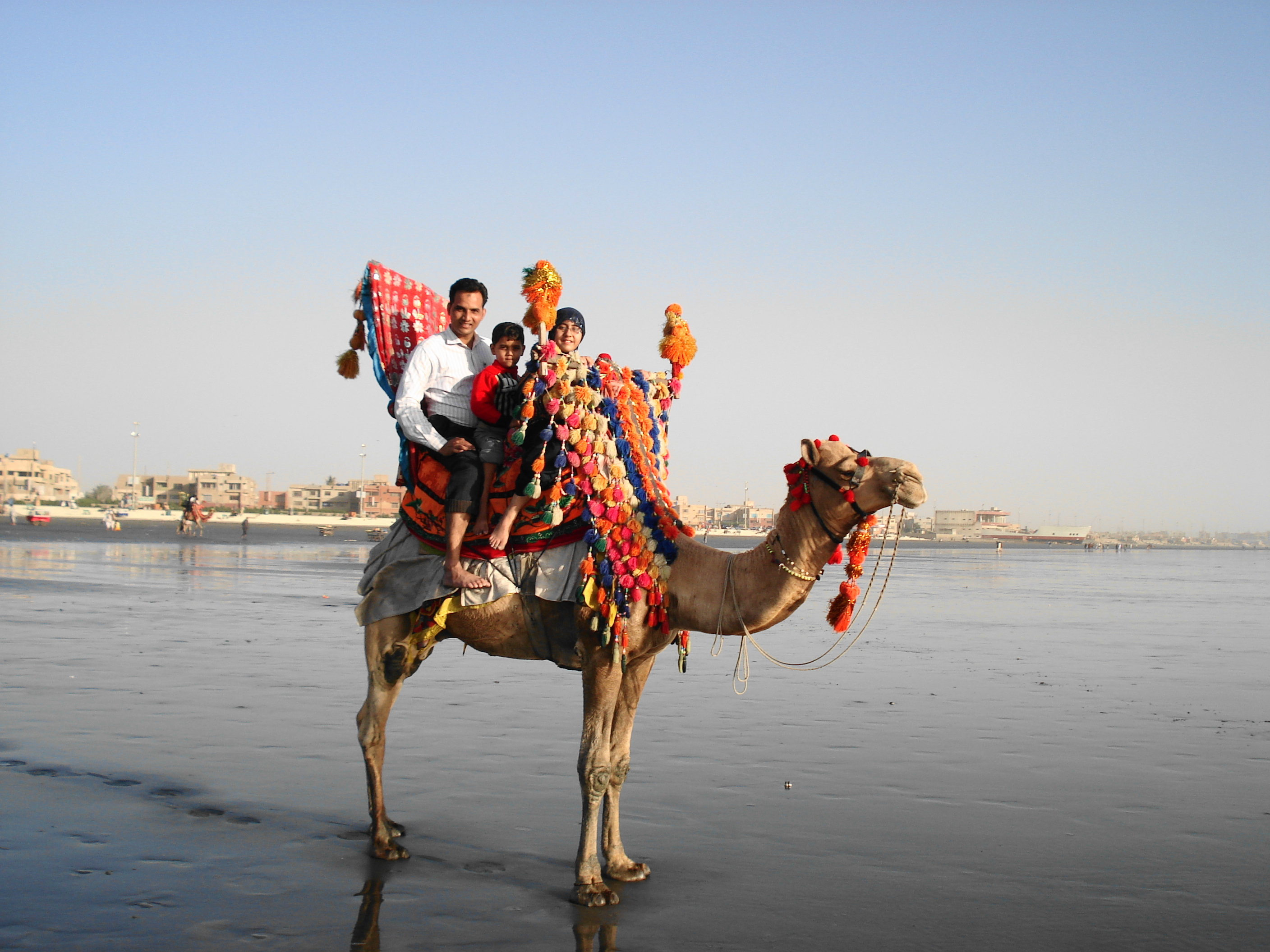
Clifton beach is popular for its camel rides.

== See also ==
- List of beaches in Pakistan
