= Qasr-e-Fatima =

Museum in Karachi, Pakistan

Qasr-e-Fatima محل موہٹا
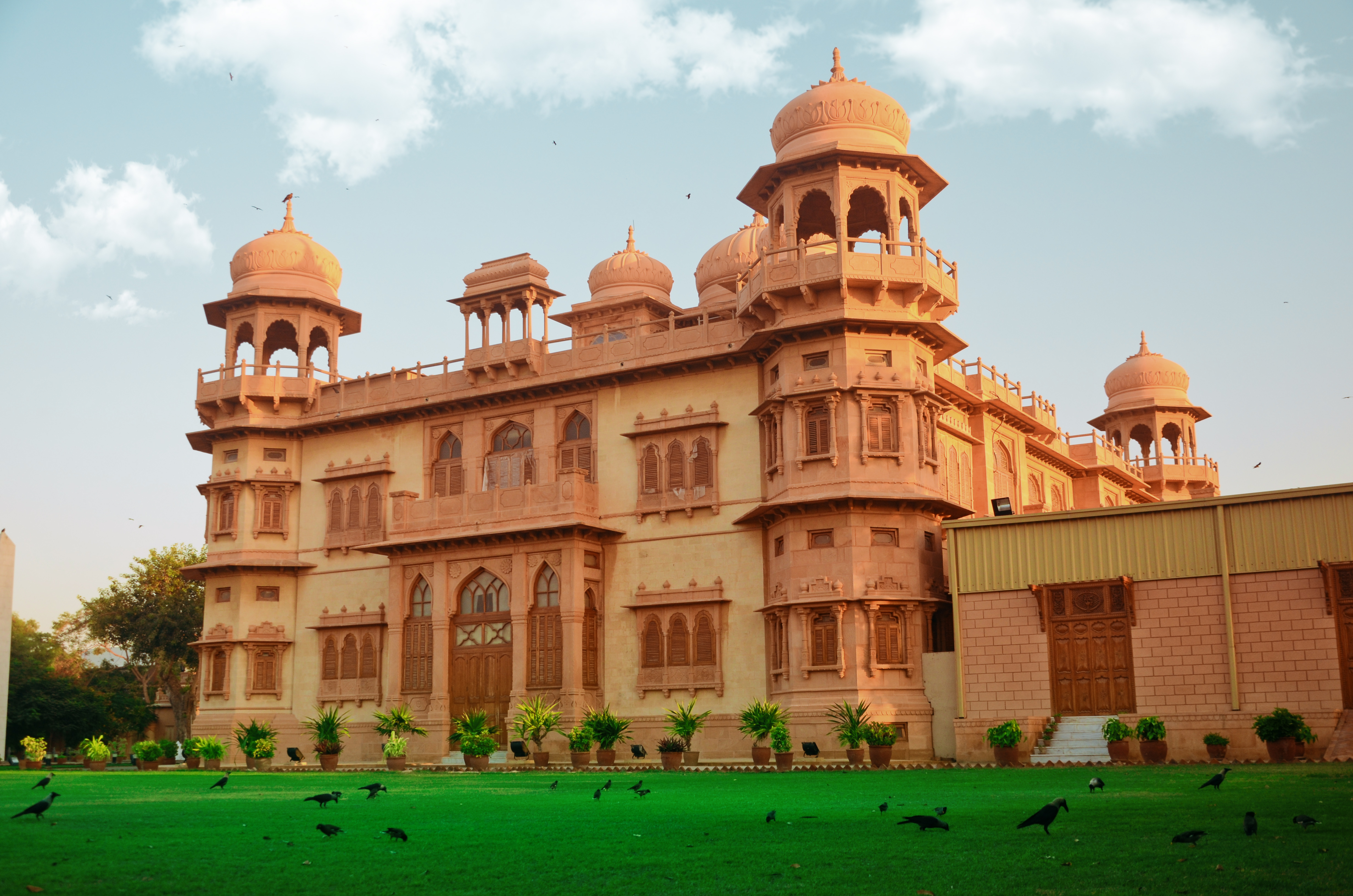
- Mohatta Palace, one of Karachi's most notable landmarks.

General information
- Architectural style: Indo-Saracenic architecture
- Location: Karachi, Pakistan
- Coordinates: 24.814°N 67.032°E
- Completed: 1927
- Client: Shivratan Chandraratan Mohatta

Technical details
- Structural system: Pink Jodhpur stone in combination with the local yellow stone from Gizri.
- Size: 18,500 sq ft (1,720 m^{2})

Design and construction
- Architect: Ahmad Hussain Agha

Qasr-e-Fatima, also known as the Mohatta Palace, (Urdu: محل موہٹا / Sindhi: موھٽا پیلس) is a museum. Designed by Ahmed Hussain Agha, the palace was built in 1927 in the affluent seaside suburb of Clifton as the summer home of Shivratan Mohatta, a Hindu Marwari businessman from what is now the modern-day Indian state of Rajasthan. The palace was built in the tradition of stone palaces of Rajasthan, using pink Jodhpur stone in combination with the local yellow stone from nearby Gizri.

== Background ==
Shivratan Chandraratan Mohatta was a Hindu Marwari businessman, who traced his roots in Bikaner, Rajasthan, his recorded ancestry began with Motilal Mohata (spelt Mohatta in English), who migrated in 1842 from Bikaner to Hyderabad (in Telangana, India) to become a clerk in a shop. His four children migrated to Calcutta and became leading merchants of imported cloth. One of them, Govardhan Mohta, moved to Karachi in 1883. His older son, Ramgopal, became a scholar and author. Karachi's Hindu Gymkhana building, officially known as the Seth Ramgopal Goverdhandas Mohatta Hindu Gymkhana was named after this son. Govardhan Mohta's younger son Shivrattan became an industrialist in Karachi, and made his fortune from the manufacturing of palm olive soap.

== Features ==
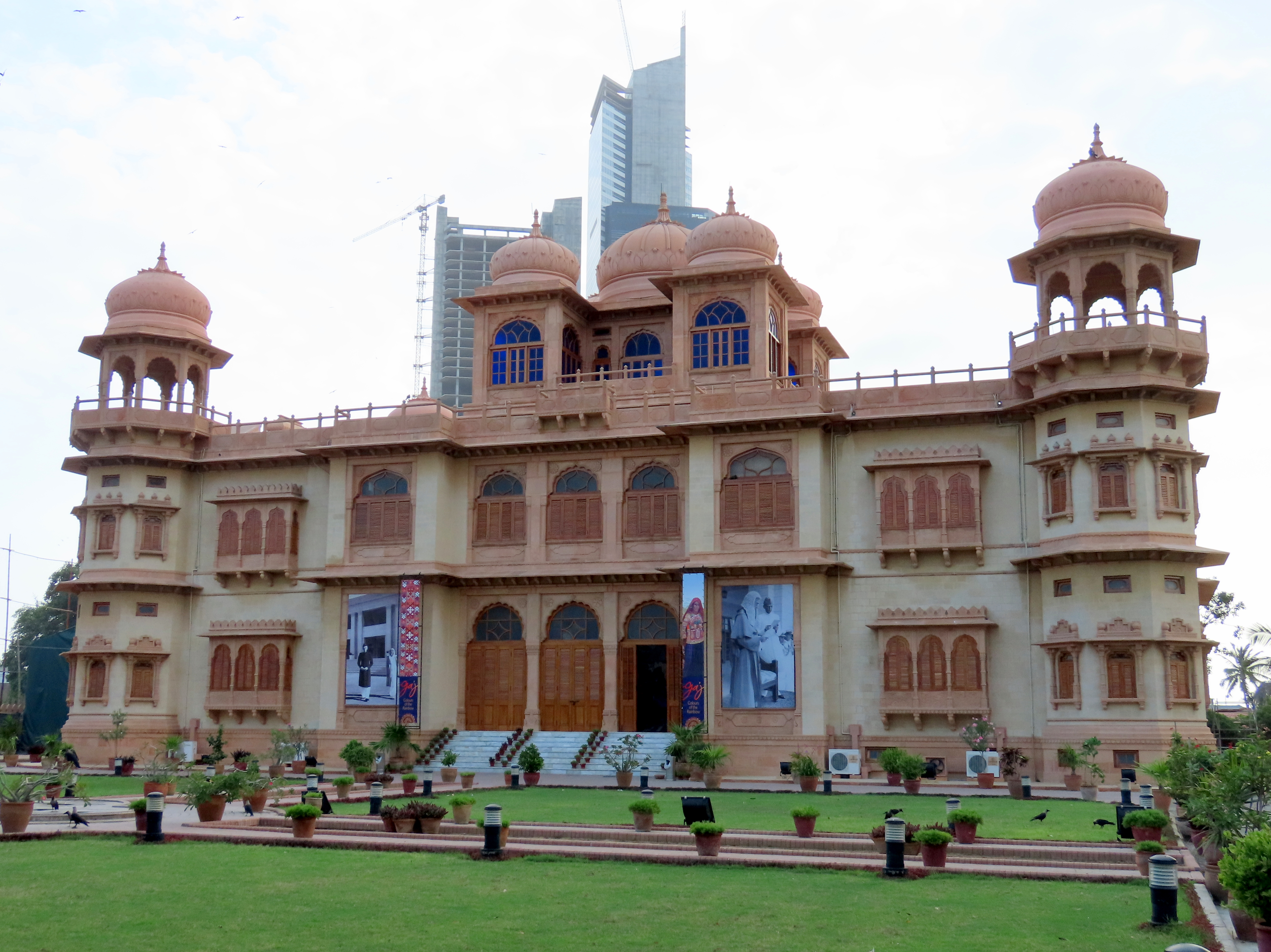
Frontside of Mohatta Palace

The palace has an area of 1,720 m^{2} (18,500 sq ft) and its façade is trimmed with windows, stone brackets, spandrels, domes, balustrades with floral motifs and exquisite railings. There are nine domes, with a centre dome in the middle; while the windows in the front portion opening out into the garden are of blue colour and those in the rear area are arched windows with stained glass. The palace has large stately rooms designed for entertainment on the ground floor and more private facilities on the first floor, where there is a terrace provided with a shade from intense sunlight. The palace is solely made up of teak wood with a polished staircase, long corridors and doors opening within doors. The "barsati” (terrace) of the Mohatta Palace had a beautiful family temple dedicated to the Hindu God, lord Shiva. The amalgam gave the palace a distinctive presence in an elegant neighbourhood, characterised by Indo-Saracenic architecture which was located not far from the sea.

Mohatta Palace was a luxurious home built in the late 1920s. The elegant palace is built on different levels and was a summer house for the Mohatta family for two decades before they left for India in 1947. There are three levels, basement, ground floor, first floor till you reach the roof. The basement that lies on the north side of the building is quite small and comprises a staircase going downwards towards a hot water pool chamber which has a connected changing room. They say it had a hot and cold water system attached, which would supply the water to the pool. Near the pool chamber are small ventilators, two on each side which may have been used as a source of sunlight and letting out steam.

Upon entering the building a corridor provides access to the rooms on the ground floor. These comprise five large rooms, apparently intended for formal or social use: two are located to the north of the entrance, two to the south, and one at the rear. The main entrance leads into a spacious corridor that surrounds a large central hall, which has an ornate ceiling and a staircase on its southern side.

There is a large square hall with seven openings leading into a corridor. The hall acts as a datum and around it the corridors are connected to the rooms where different activities are held. On the south between the two rooms is a solid teak wood, polished staircase connecting ground floor and first floor.

On each corner of the palace are octagonal towers, in which only two near the front entrance have spiral staircases that go up to the roof. At the far end, opposite the entrance is a room for entertainment which has few stairs on each side leading directly into the grounds at the back of the palace.

When viewed from outside, the ground floor has two very ornate windows on either side of the entrance consisting of three shutters in each. The same windows are on the north and south side as well, on either side of the stairs which lead from the rooms to the grounds. The octagonal towers have five windows each. In the same way there is a protruding chhajja which goes all around the ground floor to provide shade.

The first floor has private facilities unlike the ground floor. Although this floor also has a large hall in the centre having ten doors that open into the corridor that frames it on two sides (north and south) and private rooms on the other sides (east and west). There are four large bedrooms with attached restrooms and dressing rooms. Each bedroom has two openings, more like ‘doors opening into doors’. The staircase on the south ends on this floor, leaving a passageway to the left which connects to the octagonal tower staircase that leads up to the roof. There is a similar staircase on the opposite end which leads up to the roof. Whereas the remaining two towers remain disconnected, just giving an outdoor view from the windows to each floor.

Similarly, there are windows situated right above the ones on the ground floor giving a view of the vast grounds below. Also, there are three openings into the large terrace on the first floor, which overlooks the Arabian Sea. Moreover, the roof top gives an aerial view of the surrounding neighbourhood and the landscaping done below.

The rooftop is connected by staircases coming all the way up from the ground floor, through the frontal north and south octagonal towers. The four octagonal towers are topped by chattris. In the middle of the towers, on both of the north and south side are dainty three portioned, rectangular chattris. Altogether there are nine domes, with a centre dome in the middle and smaller four domes around it. This is slightly elevated and is like a room overlooking the rooftop. It has stairs on the north and south side and the five domes are interconnected.

== Exterior details ==
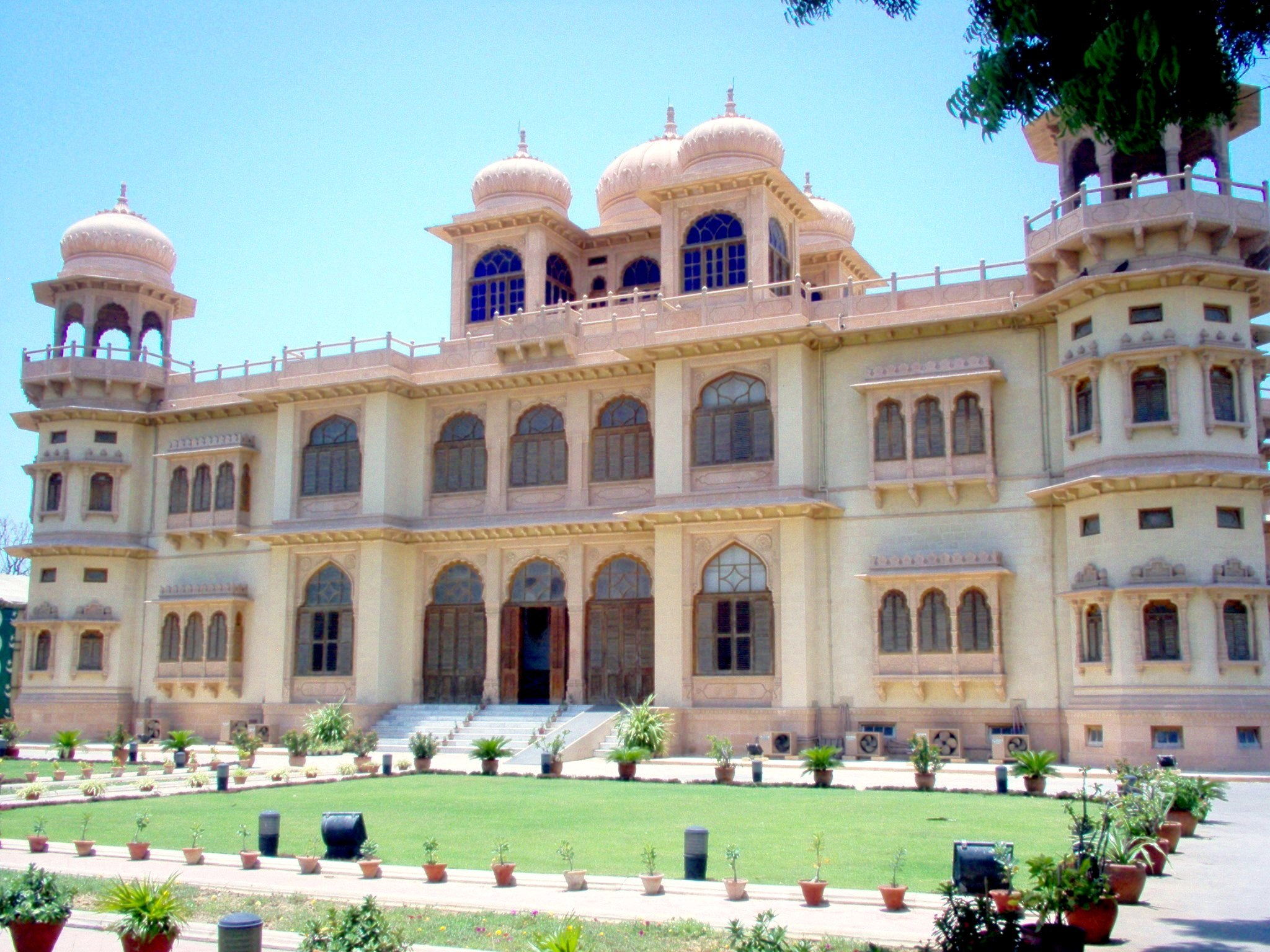
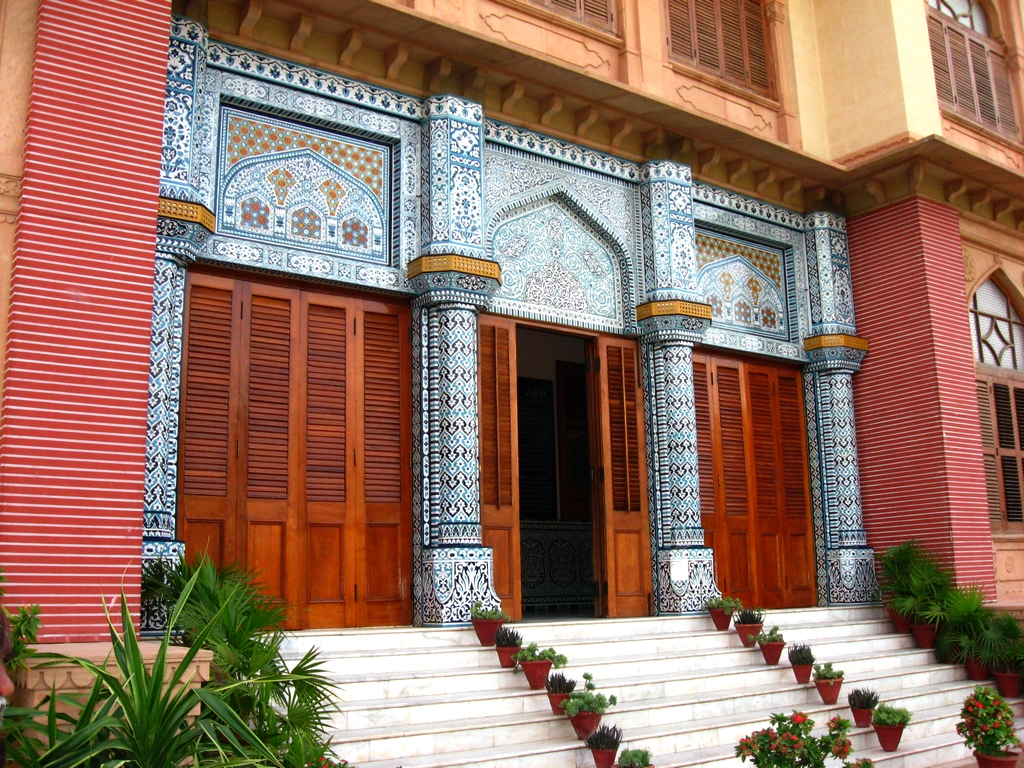
Palace original entrance (left) and during the exhibition 'Tale of the Tile' (right).

Mohatta Palace is elaborately decorated with detailed carvings found throughout the building. The delicate designs include bird’s wings in the large windows, situated in the top right and left corners of the arches.

There are also peacock motifs in the stonework and they are found around each of the nine domes. Also, there has been a lot of use of the scallop shape in upwards and downward positions around the lower areas, in the form of a strip going around the building and on top of the first and second-floor windows that protrude outwards. There are also many floral motifs around the surrounding wall, between each scallop, such as marigolds. Hibiscus flowers to are found lightly carved between rectangular shapes underneath all the windows, which are on the sides of the doorways.

Similarly, each window and doorway is framed by two large, intricately carved marigolds at the top right and left side of the arches.

Moreover, the balustrade terrace, rooftop and octagonal towers have dainty knobs and a rectangular box-like shape chiseled into each baluster.

Furthermore, there are decorative brackets underneath each window, projecting ‘chhajja’, entrance ways, domes, all around the building which makes it look more delicate to one's eye. Also, each of the columns around the building has motifs and flowers engraved horizontally between spaces. These go all around the building in a horizontal line.

Similarly, the five domes of the barsati have lines etched into them, giving them more form and texture, unlike the octagonal towers which are just plain except for the peacock carving which is present in all of the domes.

== After Independence ==
After Mohatta's departure to India, the Government of Pakistan acquired the building to house the Ministry of Foreign Affairs in 1947. Fatima Jinnah, the sister of Muhammad Ali Jinnah, moved into it in 1964. In the 1960s Mohatta Palace was dubbed Qasr-e-Fatima, becoming the hub of her presidential campaign against President Ayub Khan. After her untimely death, her sister Shireen Jinnah moved in to occupy the ground floor for many years. With her death in 1980, the palace was sealed.

== Museum ==
In 1995 it was purchased by the Government of Sindh for its conversion into a museum devoted to the arts of Pakistan. The Government of Sindh took over ownership of the property and appointed an independent board of trustees headed by the Governor to formulate recommendations on how best to adapt and use the palace. A trust was established to manage the property and ensure that it would not be sold or utilized for commercial or any purpose other than that stipulated in the trust deed. Funds for the acquisition of collections for the museum and the construction of an extension are continuously raised by the trustees through private and public grants, donations, and other fundraising activities. Mohatta Palace Museum formally opened in 1999. Next to the main building can be found a small collection of "English" statues which once stood proudly at key public locations in Karachi but flamed public fury during political turmoil in 1960–61. Some statues, notably the ones of Queen Victoria and soldiers of the Raj, were damaged during the turmoil.

=== Timings ===
- Tuesday – Sunday 11.00 to 18:00
- Friday Prayer break between 13:00 to 15:00
- Monday closed

=== Transport ===
The following public transport is available to the museum.

- Bus: No 20
- Minibus: N and W30
- Coaches: Super Hasan Zai and Khan Coach.

=== Exhibitions ===
- September 1999: Treasures of the Talpurs.
- December 1999: Qalam – The Arts of Calligraphy
- April 2000: Visions of Divinity – The Arts of Gandhara
- September 2000: Threads in Time – Costumes and Textiles of Pakistan
- November 2000: Miniature Paintings – A Revival
- August 2002: Sadequain, The Holy Sinner
- November 2003: Jamil Naqsh: A Retrospective
- August 2006: The Tale of the Tile – The Ceramic Tradition of Pakistan
- 20 March 2010 to 23 June 2010: The Birth of Pakistan hosted by The Citizens Archive of Pakistan
- 2010 – 2011: The Rising Tide – New directions in the art from Pakistan 1990 – 2010.
- 18 May 2011 to December 2011: "Rebel Angel: Asim Butt 1978–2010"
- February 2013 to 16 February 2014: Labyrinth of Reflections: The Art of Rashid Rana, 1992–2012
- May 16, 2014 – Current: Drawing the Line: Rare Maps and Prints
- July 10, 2015 – Current: A Flower from Every Meadow

=== Exhibitions in 2017 and 2018 ===
- May 8, 2018: Makli – Symphonies in Stone

Makli is one of the six World Heritage Sites located in Pakistan. Particularly outstanding among its remains is an enormous cemetery which is spread over 10 km. In the cemetery, there are close to half a million tombs and graves of kings, queens, governors, saints, scholars, and philosophers surrounded by exquisite brick or stone monuments, some of which are decorated with glazed tiles. An original concept of stone decoration with Hindu, Muslim, and Buddhist influences was created at Makli and its remnants survive to this to be admired by local and international visitors.

- October 20, 2017: Imran Mir – Alchemist of Line

Born in Karachi, Pakistan, in 1950 Imran Mir was an artist, sculptor, designer, and advertising trendsetter. He studied in art schools in Karachi and Toronto and developed a new bold style of his own that initially dumbfounded art critics. But over time, Mir earned the admiration and awe of the art world. His friend and fellow artist Iqbal Geoffrey said about his work: “The pictographs that Imran instills or stirs are novel and enlightening – not parochial, parasitical nor forget-me-not mementos of the picturesque. Love, not logic, is his forte, i.e. metaphysical ménage-a-trios of the palette, plate, and platform. He trucks mobility, and his mode is poignant – pregnant with pragmatism. Never buttering literalism. Nor brandishing liberalism." Mir died in 2014 but his life's work continues to be celebrated.

- February 15, 2017– continuing: Paradise on Earth – Manuscripts, Miniature, and Mendicants of Kashmir

The title of this exhibition is inspired by the quote by Mughal Emperor Jahangir when he visited the valley of Kashmir the first time. Translated in English from the original Persian, it means: ‘If there is heaven on earth, it is here, it is here, it is here’. The displays on exhibit span 500 years, from the date of the first printed map of the Indian subcontinent in the 1480s to the survey maps produced by British colonial official in the 1940s.

== See also ==
- List of museums in Pakistan
- List of UNESCO World Heritage Sites in Pakistan
