= List of zoos in Pakistan =

This is a list of zoos, aviaries, aquaria, safari parks, reptile centers, animal theme parks and wildlife parks in Pakistan.

For a list of botanical gardens, see List of botanical gardens in Pakistan.

== Public zoos ==
- Bahria Town Zoos, Lahore
- Bahawalpur Zoo, Bahawalpur, Punjab
- Citi Housing Zoos, Gujranwala
- DG Khan Zoo, Dera Ghazi Khan
- Bahria Enclave Zoo, Islamabad
- Faisalabad Zoo Park, Faisalabad
- Hyderabad Zoo, Hyderabad, Sindh
- Islamabad Zoo, Islamabad, Capital Territory
- Karachi Zoo, Karachi, Sindh
- Lahore Zoo, Lahore, Punjab
- Landhi Korangi Zoo, Karachi, Sindh
- Morgah Biodiversity Park, Rawalpindi, Punjab
- Multan zoo, Multan
- Peshawar Zoo, Peshawar, Khyber Pakhtunkhwa
- Rawalpindi Zoo, Rawalpindi
- Wildlife Park, Rahim Yar Khan, Punjab
- Rafay Monkey House, Toba tek singh, Punjab
- Multi Gardens Zoo, B-17, Islamabad
- Bahria Enclave Zoo , Bahria Enclave, Islamabad

== Animal theme parks ==
- Jungle World (formerly Jungle Kingdom), Rawalpindi, Punjab
- Kund Park, Swabi, Khyber Pakhtunkhwa
- Lake View Park, Islamabad, Capital Territory

== Safari parks ==
- Jallo Wildlife Park, Lahore, Punjab
- Lal Suhanra National Park, Bahawalpur, Punjab
- Lahore Zoo Safari, Lahore, Punjab formerly Lahore Wildlife Park also called Woodland Wildlife Park
- Lohi Bher Wildlife Park, Rawalpindi, Punjab
- Murree Wildlife Park, Murree, Punjab also known as Murree National Park
- Karachi Safari Park, Karachi, Sindh
- Rana Safari Park, Head Balloki, Lahore, Punjab

== Aviaries ==
- Changa Manga Vulture Center, Lahore, Punjab
- Dhodial Pheasantry, Mansehra, Khyber Pakhtunkhwa
- Karachi Walkthrough Aviary, Karachi, Sindh
- Lahore Walkthrough Aviary, Lahore, Punjab
- Lake View Park Aviary, Islamabad, Capital Territory
- Lakki Marwat Crane Center, Lakki Marwat, Khyber Pakhtunkhwa
- Saidpur Hatchery, Islamabad, Capital Territory

== Aquaria ==
- Clifton Fish Aquarium, Karachi, Sindh
- Karachi Municipal Aquarium, Karachi, Sindh
- Landhi Korangi Aquarium, Karachi, Sindh

== Wildlife parks ==
Name	District	Province
Lalazar Wildlife Park	Abbottabad	Khyber Pakhtunkhwa
Attock Wildlife Park	Attock	Punjab
Bahawalnagar Wildlife Park	Bahawalnagar	Punjab
Bhagat Wildlife Park	Toba Tek Singh	Punjab
Changa Manga Wildlife Park	Lahore	Punjab
Dera Ghazi Khan Wildlife Park	Dera Ghazi Khan	Punjab
Gatwala Wildlife Park	Faisalabad	Punjab
Jallo Wildlife Park	Lahore	Punjab
Kamalia Wildlife Park	Toba Tek Singh	Punjab
Perowal Wildlife Park	Khanewal	Punjab
Rahim Yar Khan Wildlife Park	Rahim Yar Khan	Punjab
Sulemanki Wildlife Park	Okara	Punjab
Vehari Wildlife Park	Vehari	Punjab
Woodland Wildlife Park (Lahore Zoo Safari)	Lahore	Punjab

== Breeding centers ==
- Changa Manga Breeding Center, Lahore, Punjab
- Faisalabad Breeding Center, Faisalabad, Punjab
- Hawke's Bay/Sandspit Turtle Hatchery, Karachi, Sindh
- Jallo Breeding Center, Lahore, Punjab
- Rawat Breeding Center, Rawalpindi, Punjab

== See also ==
- List of botanical gardens in Pakistan
- List of parks and gardens in Pakistan
- List of zoos
