= Lahore Wildlife Park =

Lahore Wildlife Park may refer to:

- Lahore Zoo Safari, Lahore
  - also called Woodland Wildlife Park
  - formerly called Lahore Wildlife Park
- Changa Manga, Lahore
- Jallo Wildlife Park, Lahore
