= Peshawar Zoo =

Coordinates: 34°01′02.3″N 71°29′23.0″E

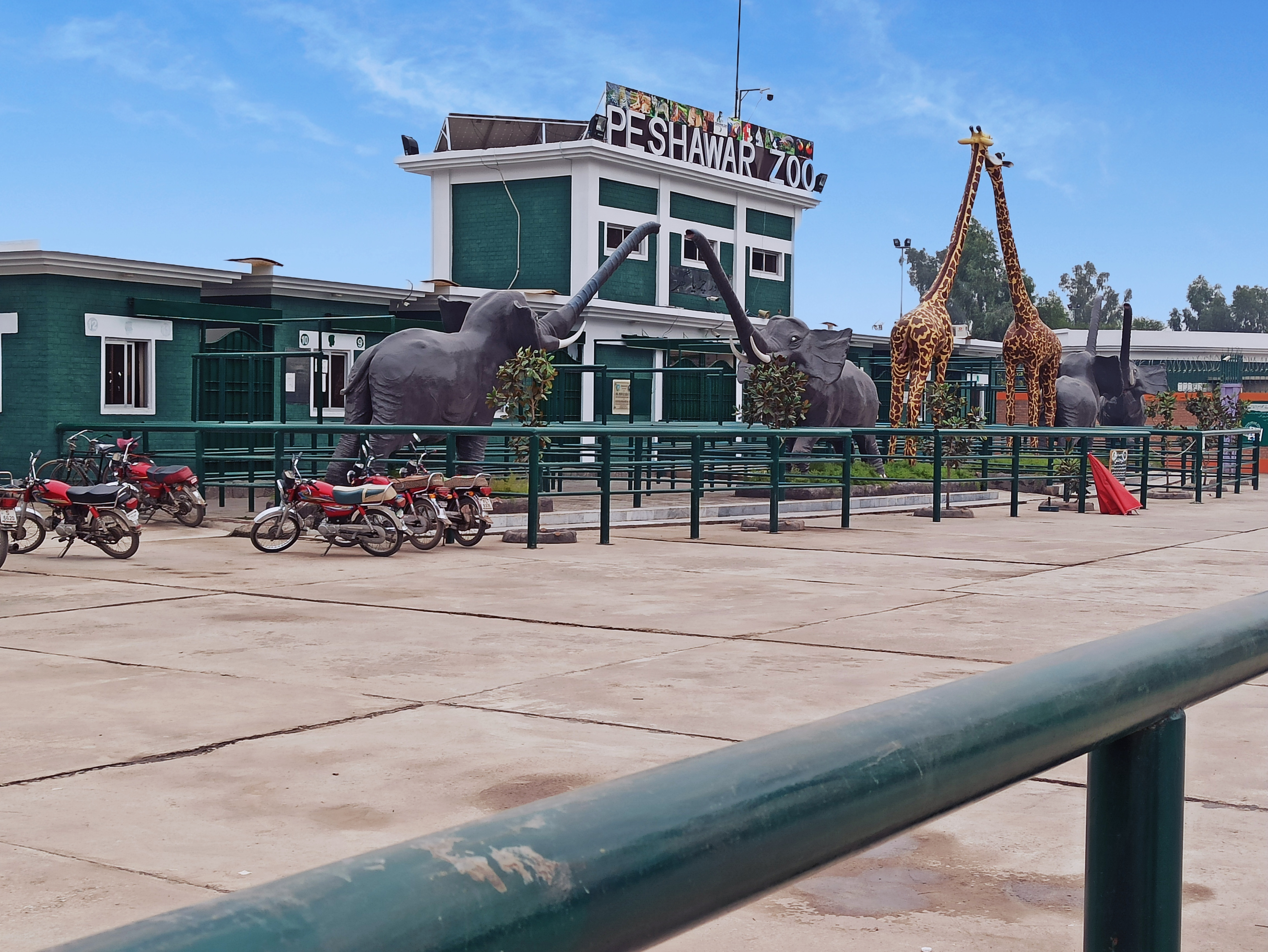
- Interactive map of Peshawar Zoo
- Date opened: 12 February 2018
- Location: Palosi road, Peshawar, Khyber Pakhtunkhwa, Pakistan
- Land area: 12 ha (30 acres)
- No. of species: ~70
- Owner: Government of Khyber Pakhtunkhwa
- Management: Wildlife Department Khyber Pakhtunkhwa

Peshawar Zoo (Urdu: پشاور چڑیا گهر, Pashto: د پېښور باغ‌وحش) is one of the largest zoos in Pakistan and the first ever zoo in Peshawar. It opened on 12 February 2018. It is managed by the Forests, Environment and Wildlife department of the Government of Khyber Pakhtunkhwa. It is the second largest zoo of Pakistan after Karachi Zoo.

== History ==
Its construction formally started on 3 February 2016, with the ground breaking ceremony being attended by Imran Khan and Chief Minister, Pervez Khattak. The zoo was officially opened to the public on 13 February 2018. The zoo is spread over an area of 12 ha besides the premises of the Pakistan Forest Institute. It is located next to Markaz-Ul-Uloom Islamia Rahatabad.

Some of the first animals to arrive were brought from Lahore Zoo in October 2017, these included a pair of lions and various species of ungulates including nilgai and blackbucks. Other animals were brought from various institutions across Khyber Pukhtunkhwa, including leopards brought from Dhodial Pheasantry and a wildlife park in Malakand and an Asiatic black bear from Nathiagali.

The zoo was formally inaugurated and opened to the public on 12 February 2018. Earlier on following the zoo's opening various animals died due to lack of medical facilities and rising temperatures in the city, these included a female snow leopard named Sonhi which died due to a clogged artery which could not be diagnosed on time and at least 2 leopard cubs which died due to heat related causes.

In June 2018, 3 pairs of Bengal tigers arrived at the zoo from South Africa, followed shortly by the arrival of giraffes and the opening of the snake house.

In November 2018 a herd of Arabian oryx arrived from United Arab Emirates, making this the first endangered species of ungulate to be imported by the zoo.

== Areas and attractions ==
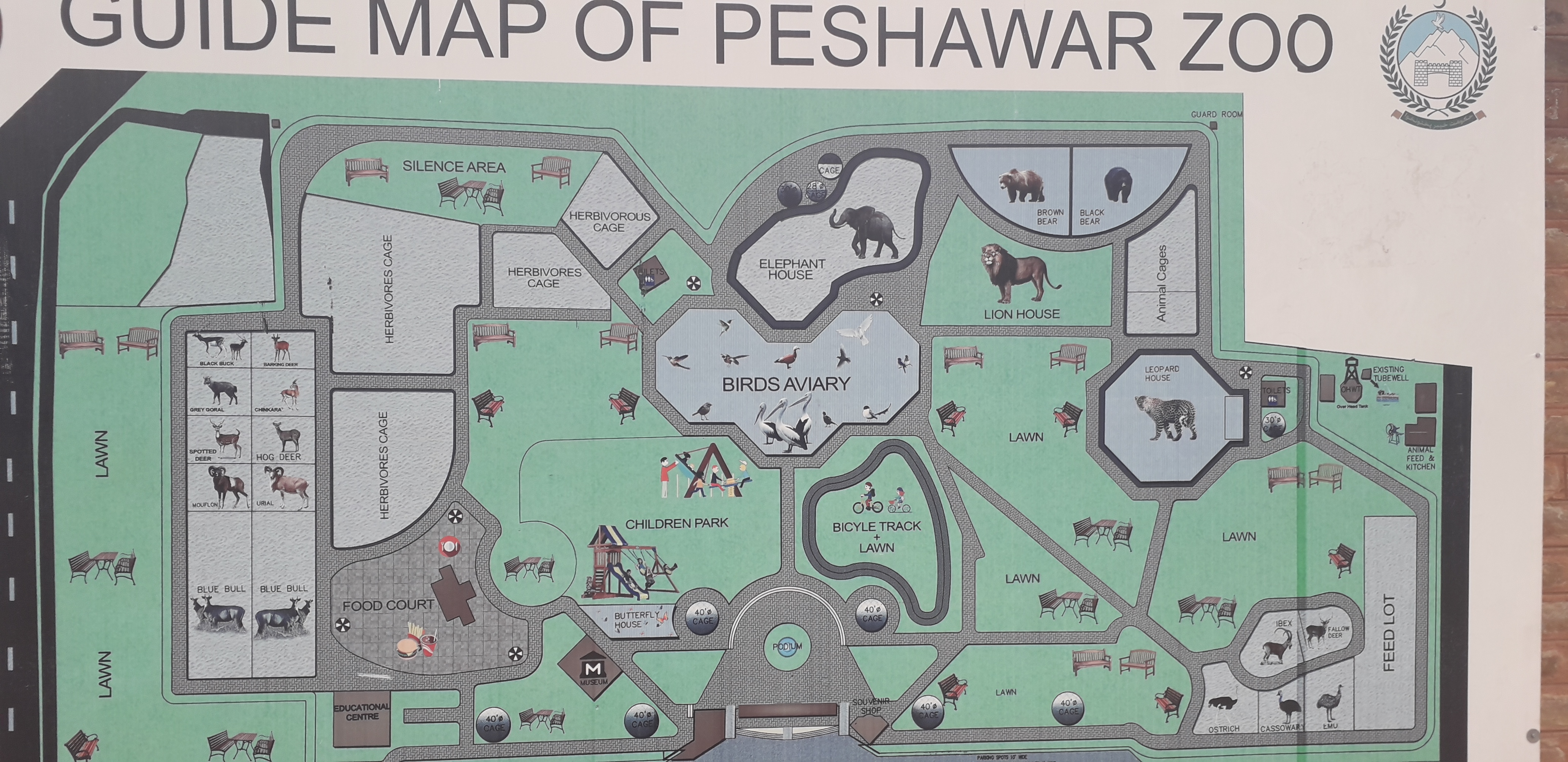
Guide Map of the Zoo

=== Lion House ===
Consisting of indoor housing, with viewing for guests, and a moated enclosure. The zoo is currently home to a pair of lions donated by the Lahore Zoo. Located adjacent is the Bear House, divided into two moats and two indoor sections for Asiatic black bear and Himalayan brown bear. Currently the zoo only house two Asiatic black bears.

=== Bird Aviary ===
A walk through aviary located in the middle of the zoo. This exhibit is not yet complete, with visitors only being able to see it from the outside. Species housed here include great white pelicans, greater flamingos, muscovy ducks, ring-necked pheasants, chukar partridges, Asian houbara bustards, demoiselle cranes and black-crowned cranes among others.

=== Leopard House ===
Consisting of 4 roofed enclosure with indoor shelters for the animals. Species housed here include an Indian leopard, rhesus macaques, a grey wolf and Bengal tigers.

=== Others ===
Other notable animals present at the zoo include giraffes, blackbucks, markhors, grey gorals, black bears, Javan green peafowl, Himalayan griffon vultures, Peregrine falcons and Indian cobras.

== Animals ==
=== Mammals ===
- Red-necked wallaby
- Rhesus macaque
- Lion
- Bengal tiger
- Indian leopard
- Indian wolf
- Asiatic black bear
- Plains zebra
- Llama
- Bactrian camel
- Giraffe
- Red deer
- Chital
- Sambar deer
- Hog deer
- Nilgai
- Arabian oryx
- Blackbuck
- Chinkara
- Himalayan goral
- Sindh ibex
- Markhor
- Mouflon
- Urial

=== Birds ===
- Common ostrich
- Great white pelican
- Greater flamingo
- Muscovy duck
- Mallard
- Domestic duck
- Peregrine falcon
- Saker falcon
- Northern goshawk
- Black-shouldered kite
- Himalayan vulture
- Indian peafowl
- Green peafowl
- Common pheasant
- Silver pheasant
- Golden pheasant
- Lady Amherst's pheasant
- Red junglefowl
- Chukar partridge
- MacQueen's bustard
- Common crane
- Demoiselle crane
- Black-crowned crane
- Eurasian collared dove
- Cockatiel
- Sulphur-crested cockatoo
- Rose-ringed parakeet
- Plum-headed parakeet
- Fischer's lovebird
- Yellow-collared lovebird
- Eclectus parrot
- Eastern rosella
- Budgerigar
- Scarlet macaw
- Blue-and-yellow macaw
- Java sparrow

=== Reptiles ===
- Indian flapshell turtle
- Indian spiny-tailed lizard
- Indian python
- Eryx johnii
- Ptyas mucosa
- Spalerosophis diadema
- Corn snake
- Indian cobra
- Crocodile
- Russell's viper

== Animal births ==
The zoo welcomed 4 Indian leopard cubs on 30 April 2018. The cubs were born to a pair of leopards originating from the Hazara and Malakand regions of Pakistan. It was reported that at least two of the cubs died due to the increasing temperature in the city. Other births at the zoo include a llama and a Bactrian camel.

== See also ==
- List of zoos in Pakistan
- List of parks and gardens in Pakistan
