= Karachi Zoo =

Zoo in Pakistan

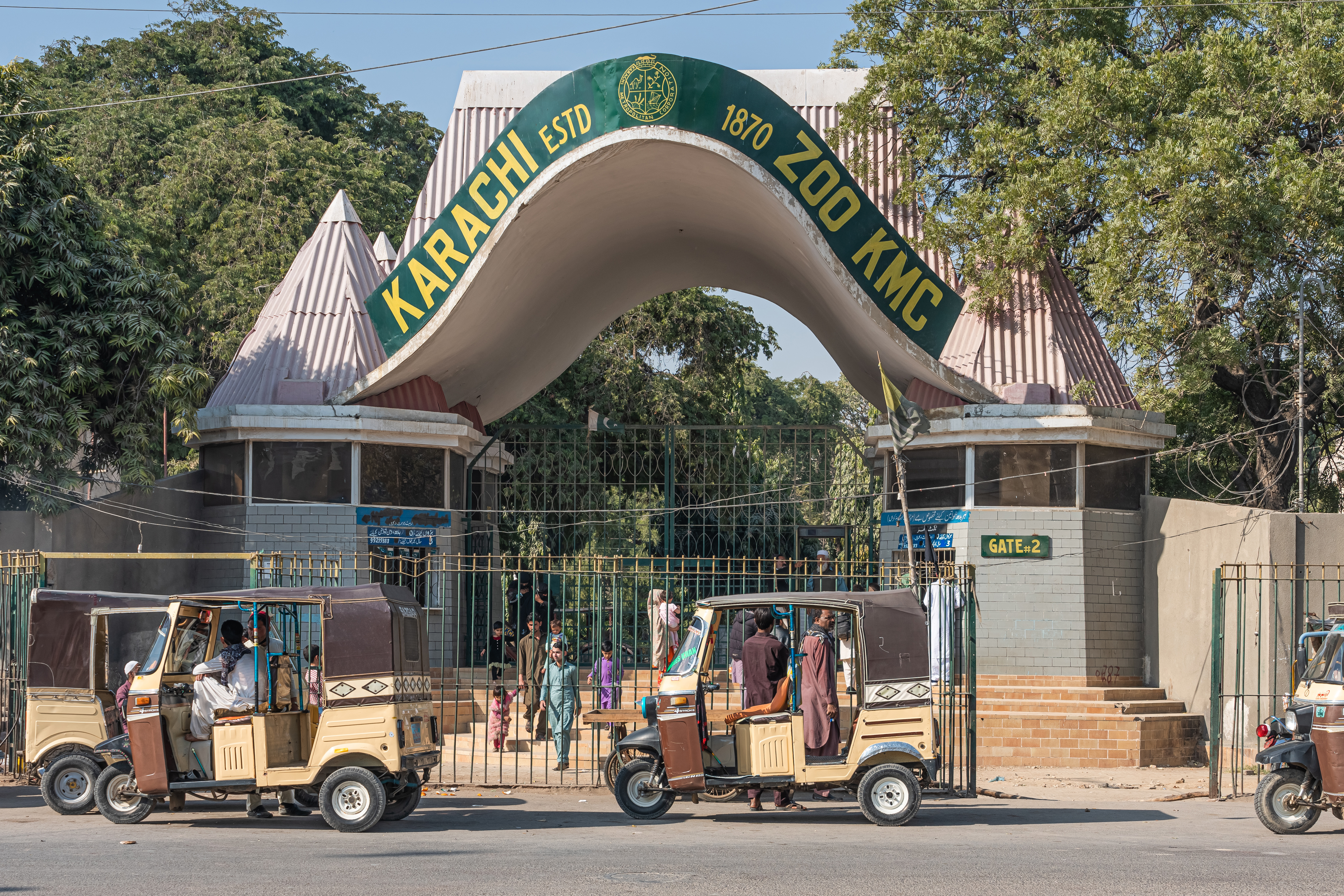
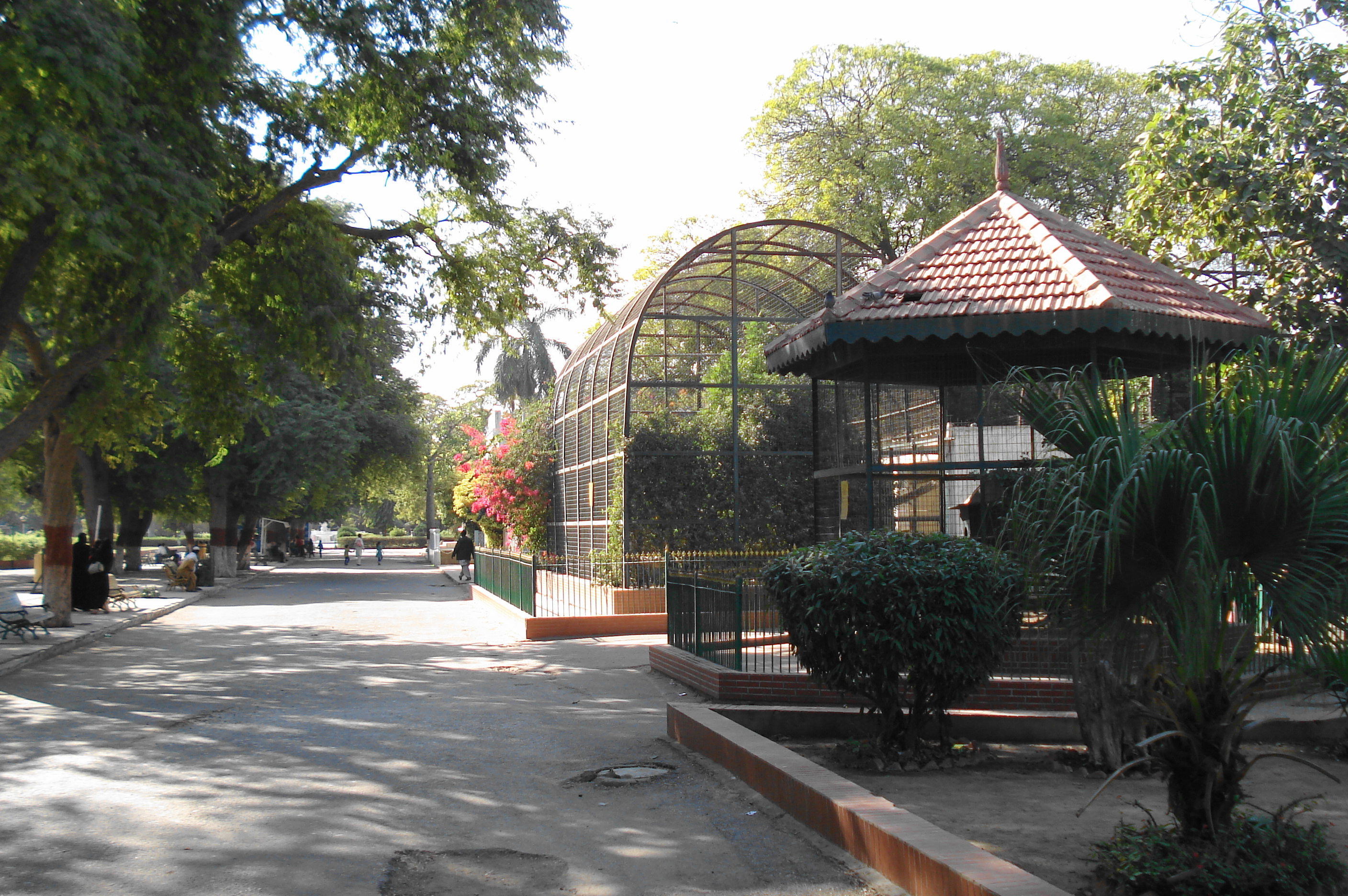
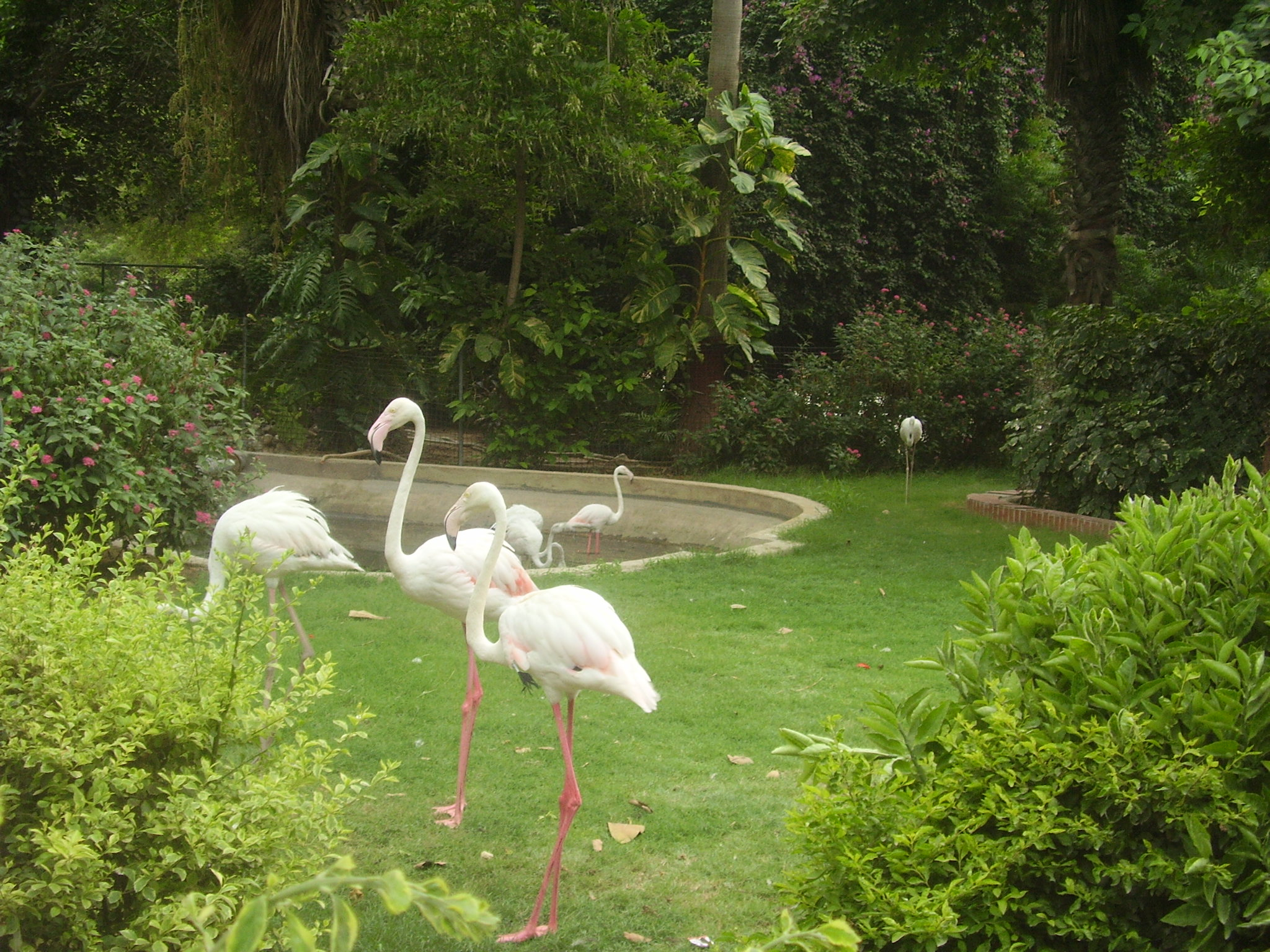
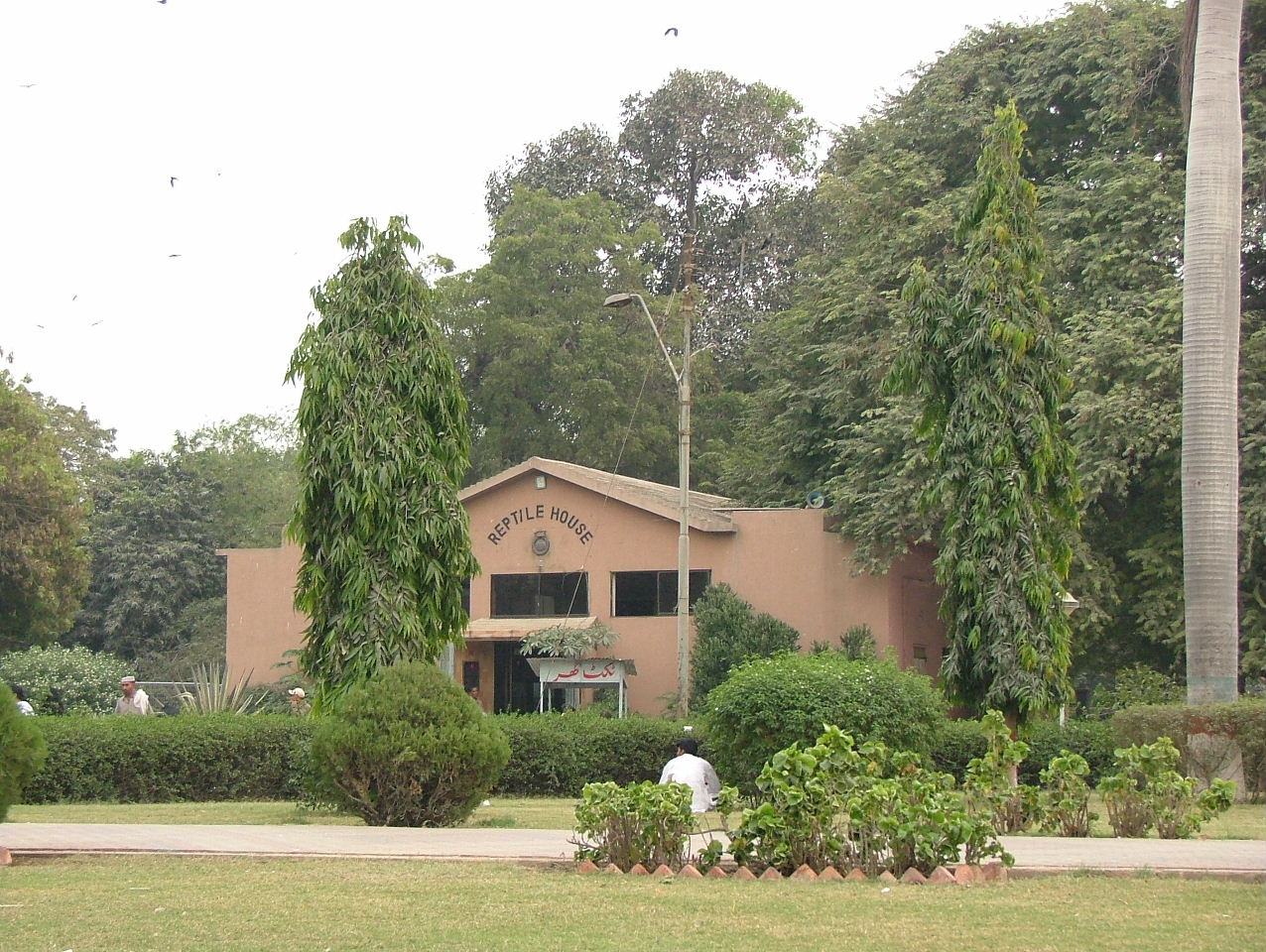
- Left to right: Entrance • Courtyard • Flamingoes • Reptile House
- Interactive map of Karachi Zoo
- 24.876228°N 67.023203°E
- Date opened: 1878
- Location: Nishtar Road, Garden East; Karachi, Sindh, Pakistan
- Land area: 13.3 ha (33 acres)
- No. of animals: ~880
- No. of species: ~80
- Annual visitors: 0.1 million (2001)
- Website: http://www.karachizoo.pk

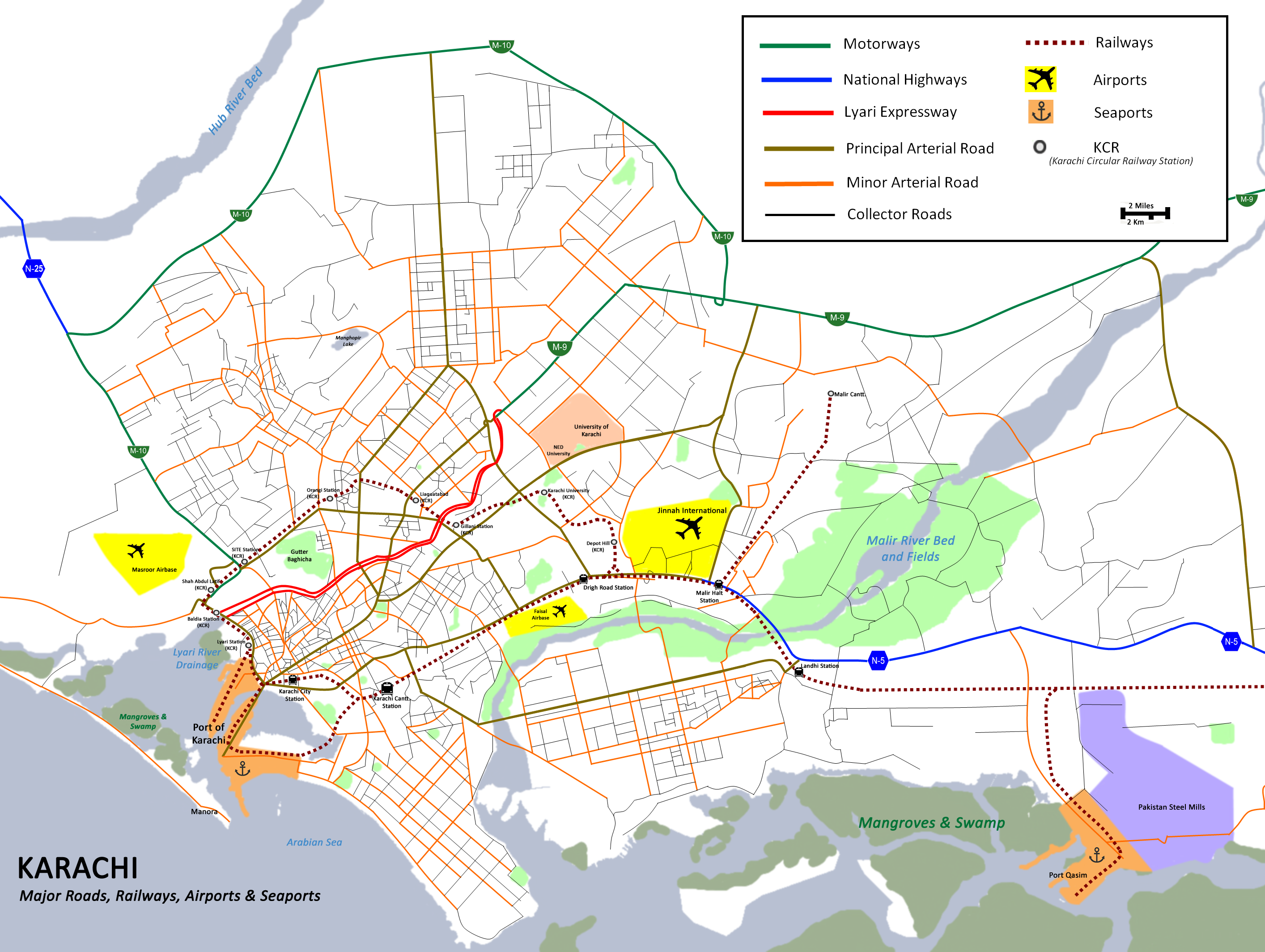
Location in Karachi

The Karachi Zoo (Urdu: کراچی چڑیاگھر; Sindhi: ڪراچي چڙيا گهر), also known as Karachi Zoological and Botanical Gardens, Gandhi Garden, is located in Garden East, Karachi, Sindh, Pakistan. Established in 1899, it is the largest zoo of Pakistan and second oldest zoo in the country after Lahore Zoo.

== History ==
On Mahatma Gandhi's visit to Karachi in 1934, Karachi Municipal Corporation changed the name from Victoria Garden to Mahatma Gandhi Garden. In 1947, the name was changed yet again to 'Karachi Zoological Gardens' or 'Karachi Zoo' for short. In 1953, Karachi Metropolitan Corporation introduced a zoo curator and a qualified veterinary doctor. In 1991-2, City District Government Karachi (CDGK) planned for remodelling of Natural History Museum, which was carried out. In 1992, the Japanese Princess inaugurated the remodelled Natural History Museum. In 2008, total number of employees of Karachi Zoo was about 240 staff members.

== Areas and attractions ==
- Elephant House is the most famous exhibit in the zoo. A 65-year-old Asian elephant, named 'Anarkali', died on 19 July 2006. Two female African bush elephants arrived at the zoo on 16 May 2010 from Karachi Safari Park. Both were born in Tanzania in 2007 and have been named Noor Jehan and Madhu Bala.
- Natural History Museum, renovated in 1992, is one of the more famous attractions in Karachi Zoo. Apart from stuffed animals; skins, antlers, horns, feathers etc. are also placed on display in the museum. The facility is used by zoology students for research and educational purposes.
- Reptile House was extended and renovated in 1992. It is one of the few reptile houses in Pakistan. There are 13 species of snakes and lizards. Newly born hatchlings of testudines and crocodilians are also exhibited.
- Veterinary Hospital was established in 1998 in Karachi Zoo with modern diagnostic facilities. There is an operation theatre, equipped with X-ray and sonogram facilities, multiple sick bays, a laboratory and an incubation room.
- Mughal Garden, established in 1970, has green lawns with seasonal plants that occupy a major part of the garden accompanied with Mughal-style fountains. The garden is famous for different varieties of rose and other flowers that are exhibited there.
- White Lions, purchased in 2012 and a big draw for the zoo, are a part of a breeding programme.
- Mumtaz Mahal, A very popular show of Mumtaz Begum (Karachi Zoo) is held there.

=== Karachi Municipal Aquarium ===
Karachi Municipal Aquarium was constructed in 1953. Located inside the Karachi Zoo, the aquarium has a total of 28 tanks which contain a total of around 300 fishes of about 30 species. It is one of the three public aquaria in Karachi, the other two being Clifton Fish Aquarium and Landhi Korangi Aquarium.

== Noteworthy animals ==
=== Bears ===
On 15 March 2017, two new bears were welcomed to the zoo, a male Asian black bear and a female Syrian brown bear.

=== Noor Jehan ===
Noor Jehan (died; 22 April 2023) was a 17-year-old female African elephant who lived at the zoo. She was already in poor health when she fell into a concrete pond at the zoo in April 2023.

In August 2022, Four Paws team successfully removed the rotten tusks of Noor Jehan at the zoo. She was being treated by a group of foreign medical professionals from the international animal welfare organisation Four Paws, who had diagnosed an internal hematoma and a damaged pelvic floor as the primary causes of her physical agony and suffering. She was partially paralyzed.

After falling into the pond, Noor Jehan was retrieved from the pond by a crane, and it was said that she was having trouble standing up because of pain in her back legs. Foreign medical professionals continued to oversee her care, and a group of regional vets was also assembled to assist the zoo's management. Noor Jehan was receiving prescription drugs, vitamins, painkillers, and hydrotherapy at Four Paws' advice to treat her condition. The authorities had committed to relocating both Noor Jehan and her companion elephant Madhubala to a species-appropriate place that fulfils international standards as soon as Noor Jehan was healthy enough to be moved.

After hearing about Noor Jehan's failing health, a lot of individuals voiced their worry and sorrow at the situation the animal was in. Celebrities including singer Natasha Baig, actresses Ayesha Omar, Zhalay Sarhadi, and Simi Rahael also joined the discussion and promoted animal rights.

On 22 April 2023 Noor Jehan died. Despite the efforts of local veterinarians and Four Paws International, the 17-year-old African elephant's condition deteriorated while she was receiving treatment for a tumor and hemorrhage. Animal protection organizations have demanded improved treatment for wild animals kept in the captivity in Pakistan and the repatriation of Madhubala, Noor Jehan's friend. The care of animals in Pakistan's zoos has long drawn criticism, with elephants typically dying young from obesity and high levels of stress. The government has promised to form an impartial zoo management committee and push for necessary changes.

=== Madhubala ===
Madhubala is a female African elephant at the zoo. She was reportedly caught and separated from her mother at a very young age in Tanzania before being brought to Pakistan. In August 2022, Four Paws team successfully removed the rotten tusks of Madhubala at the zoo.

== Controversies and criticism ==
The treatment and conditions of the animals in the zoo has been criticized in the Pakistani media.

Another reason Karachi Zoo has developed a negative reputation is because of multiple deaths of resident species of Arabian oryx, classified as critically endangered by IUCN. A pair was bought from a private farm in 2007. The female gave birth to a female in 2007 and later, to a male and a female in 2008, both of which died in 2009. The first-born oryx gave birth on 12 March 2010 to another calf, who died the following day. Four days later, the mother of the calf also died in the zoo hospital. At that point, the zoo was left with the original pair from 2007. On March 23, 2010, the female of the pair, who was being treated for a foot injury at the zoo hospital for a week also died.

In April 2016, a 16-year-old Bengal tiger named Alex died in the zoo due to kidney failure while being diagnosed. Now the zoo is left with only one female tiger named Rachel. The zoo made a request to the government for a new male tiger for the zoo. Earlier the same month the zoo lost three young Blackbucks in a fight within the enclosure during the night as the zookeepers are only present in daytime. There was no one to take care of the animals when the incident happened. Three newborn Puma cubs have also died in the zoo.

== Species list ==
Aves

- Black crowned crane
- Common pheasant
- Greater flamingo
- Green peafowl
- Indian peafowl
- Mute swan
- Ring-necked parakeet
- Rock pigeon

Mammals

- Arabian oryx
- Asiatic black bear
- African bush elephant
- Bactrian camel
- Bengal tiger
- Black buck
- Chital (spotted deer)
- Fallow deer
- Giraffe
- Tibetan antelope (Chiru)
- Hog deer
- Indian crested porcupine
- Indian wolf (Indian jackal)
- Lion
- Llama
- Mouflon (sub. urial)
- Nilgai
- Olive baboon
- Plains zebra
- Red deer
- Sika deer
- Spotted hyena
- Wild goat (sub. Sindh ibex)

Reptiles

- Gharial
- Indian cobra
- Indian sand boa
- Mugger crocodile
- Oriental ratsnake
- Spur-thighed tortoise

== Picture gallery ==
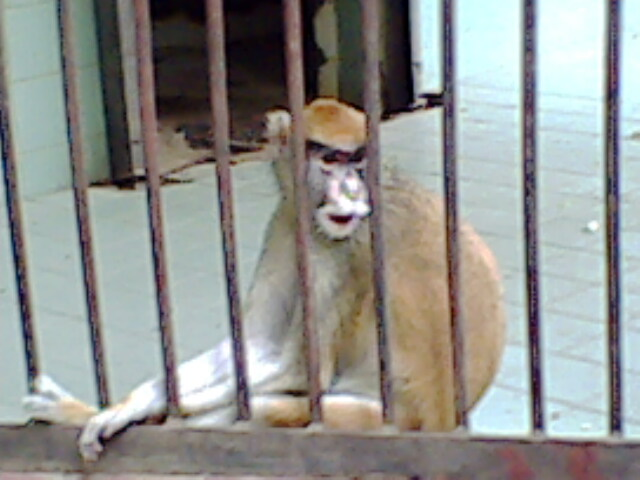
Monkey

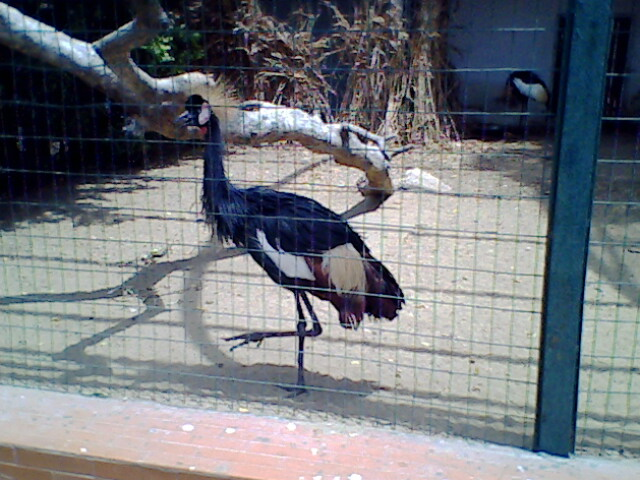
Black crowned crane

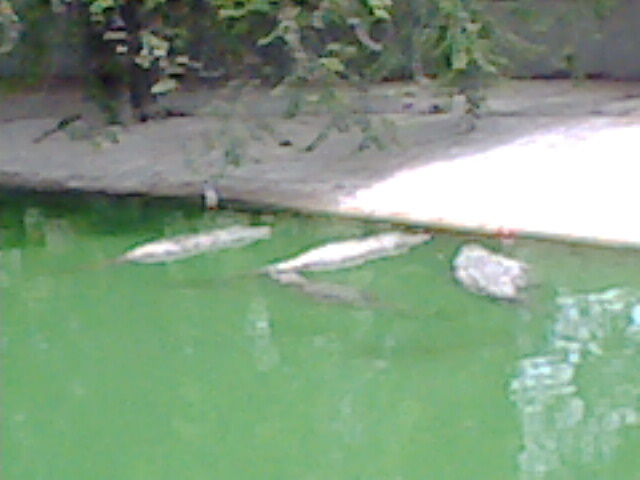
Crocodiles in a pond

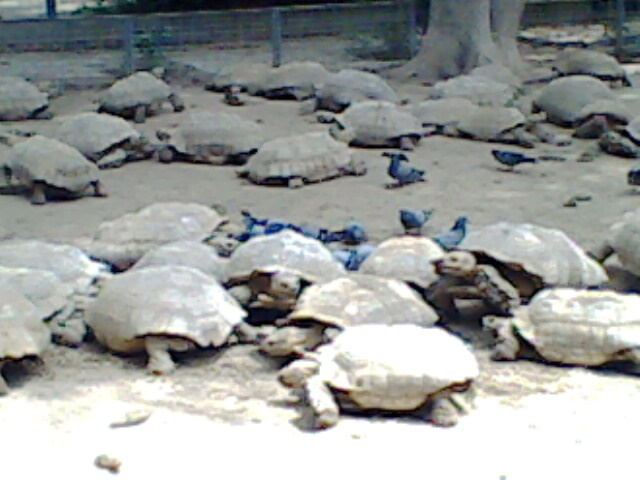
Land tortoises

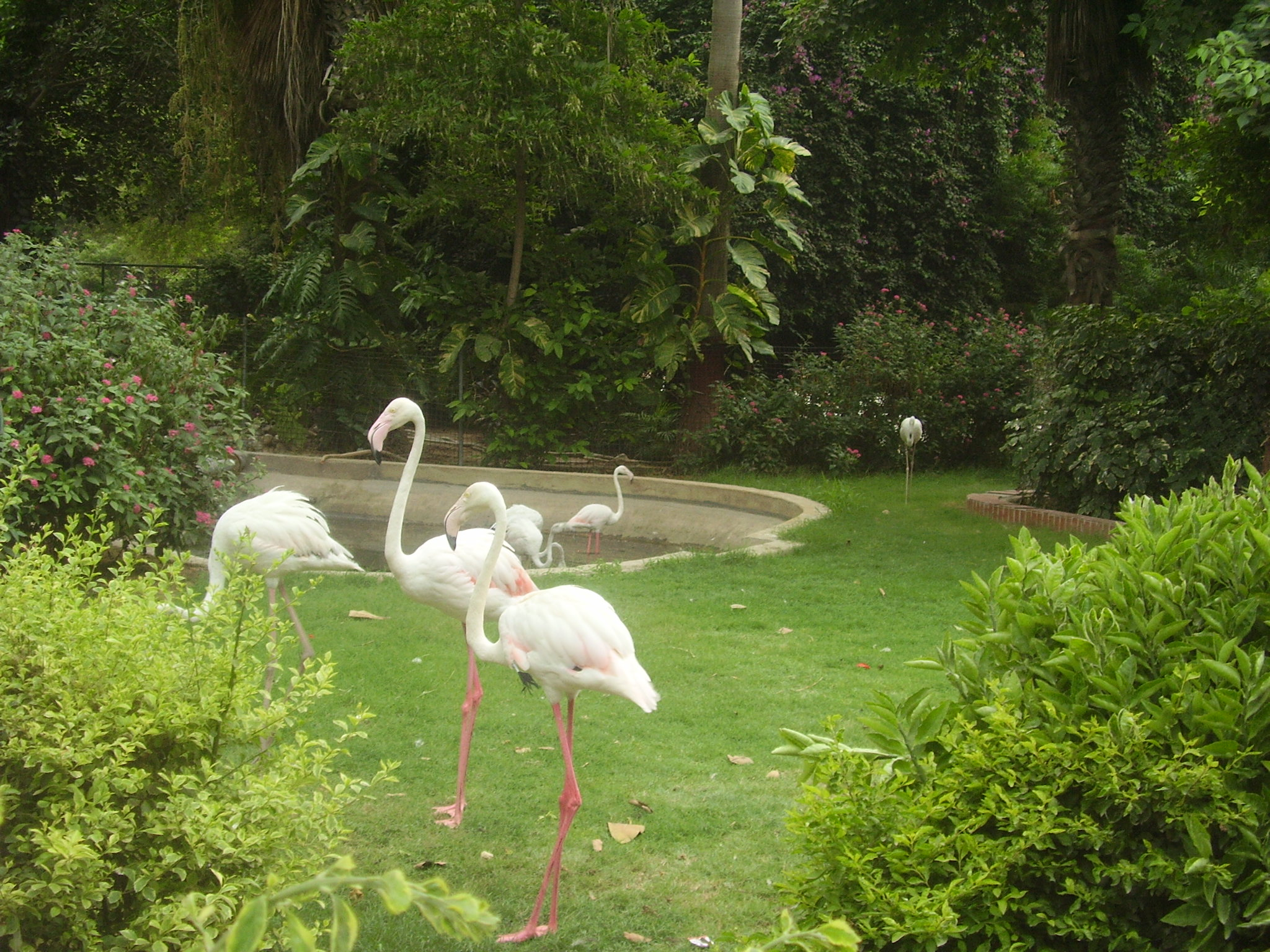
Flamingos

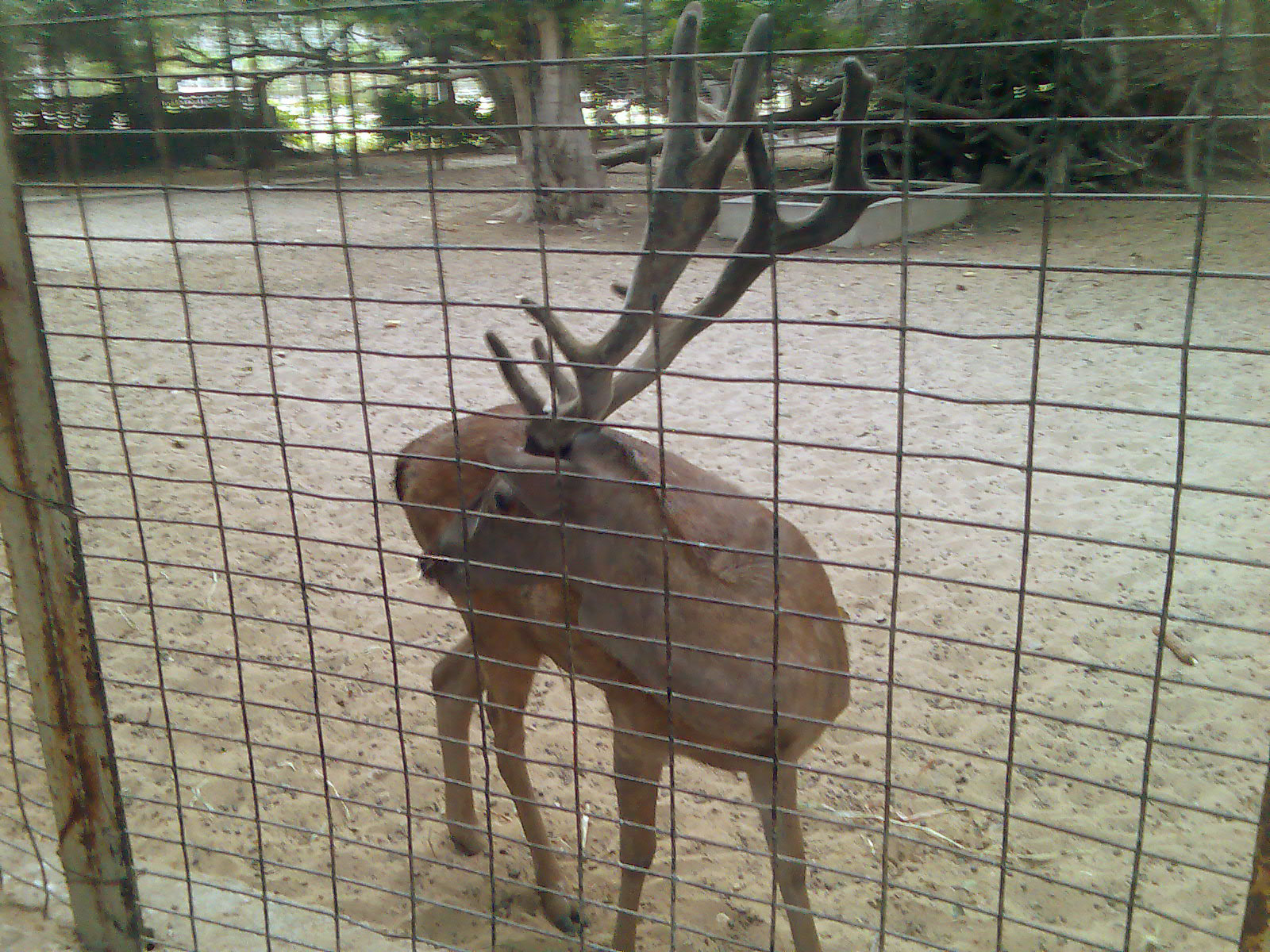
Antler deer

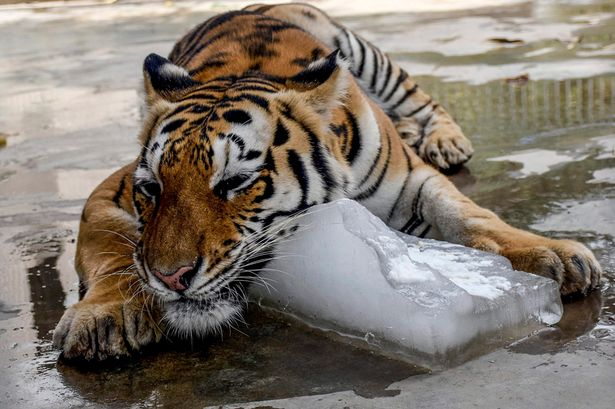
Bengal tiger beat off with an ice lump.

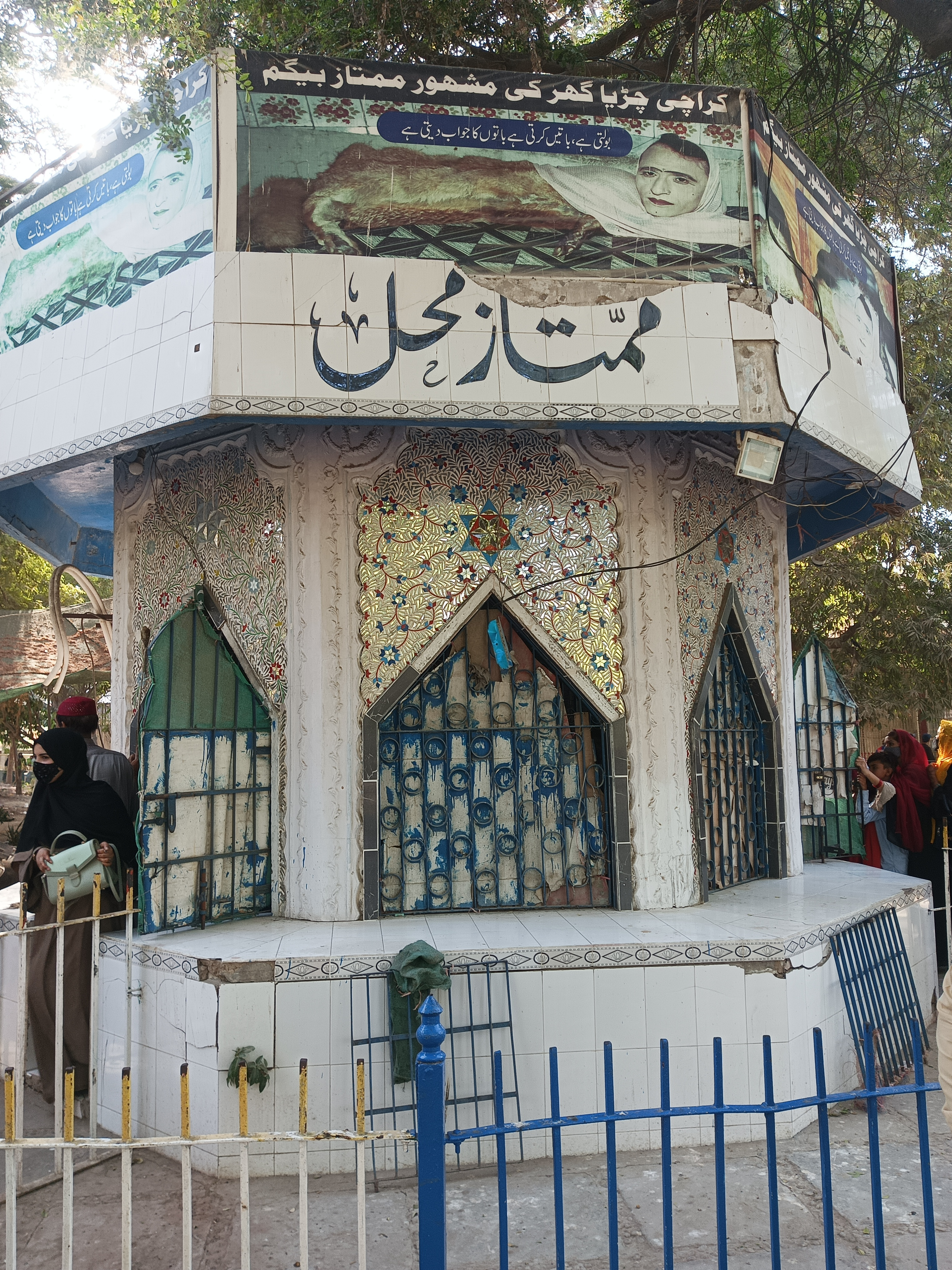
Mumtaz Mahal Pavilion

== See also ==
- List of zoos in Pakistan
- List of parks and gardens in Pakistan
- List of parks and gardens in Karachi
- List of individual elephants
