= Ahlowal =

- Town
- Location within Pakistan
- Coordinates: 30°56′56″N 73°44′36″E
- Country: Pakistan
- Province: Punjab
- District: Kasur
- Time zone: UTC+5 (PST)

Ahlowal is a town in the province of Punjab, Pakistan, 80 km from Lahore.

Its district is Kasur and its tehsil is Pattoki. It is 2 km from Changa Manga, a major man-made forest.

The native language is Punjabi and the principal occupation is agriculture, with the main crops being sugarcane, tobacco, turmeric, corn, cotton, and particularly potato. Ahlowal is rich in the latest technology like 4G internet technology, electricity, telephonic system. It has produced many professors, engineers, doctors.
