= Rakh Jhok Forest =

Smart forest in Pakistan

Rakh Jhok Forest رکھ جھوک جنگل
- Interactive map of Rakh Jhok Forest

Geography
- Location: Sheikhupura District, Punjab, Pakistan
- Coordinates: 31°26.03′N 74°19.4′E
- Area: across an area of more than 3,000 acres.

Administration
- Established: 2021
- Authority: Punjab Forest Department, Government of Punjab, Pakistan

Ecology
- Indicator plants: Dalbergia sissoo (Sheesham), Acacia nilotica (Kikar), Morus alba (White mulberry), Bombax ceiba (Simal).

Rakh Jhok Forest (Punjabi, Urdu: رکھ جھوک جنگل) is the first smart forest in Punjab, Pakistan's Sheikhupura District, at the Rakh Jhok area on the Ravi River. Ten million trees are planned to be planted in the forest for the first time in Pakistan.

== See also ==
- Changa Manga
