= Go Aish =

Pakistani theme park

Go Aish Adventure Park
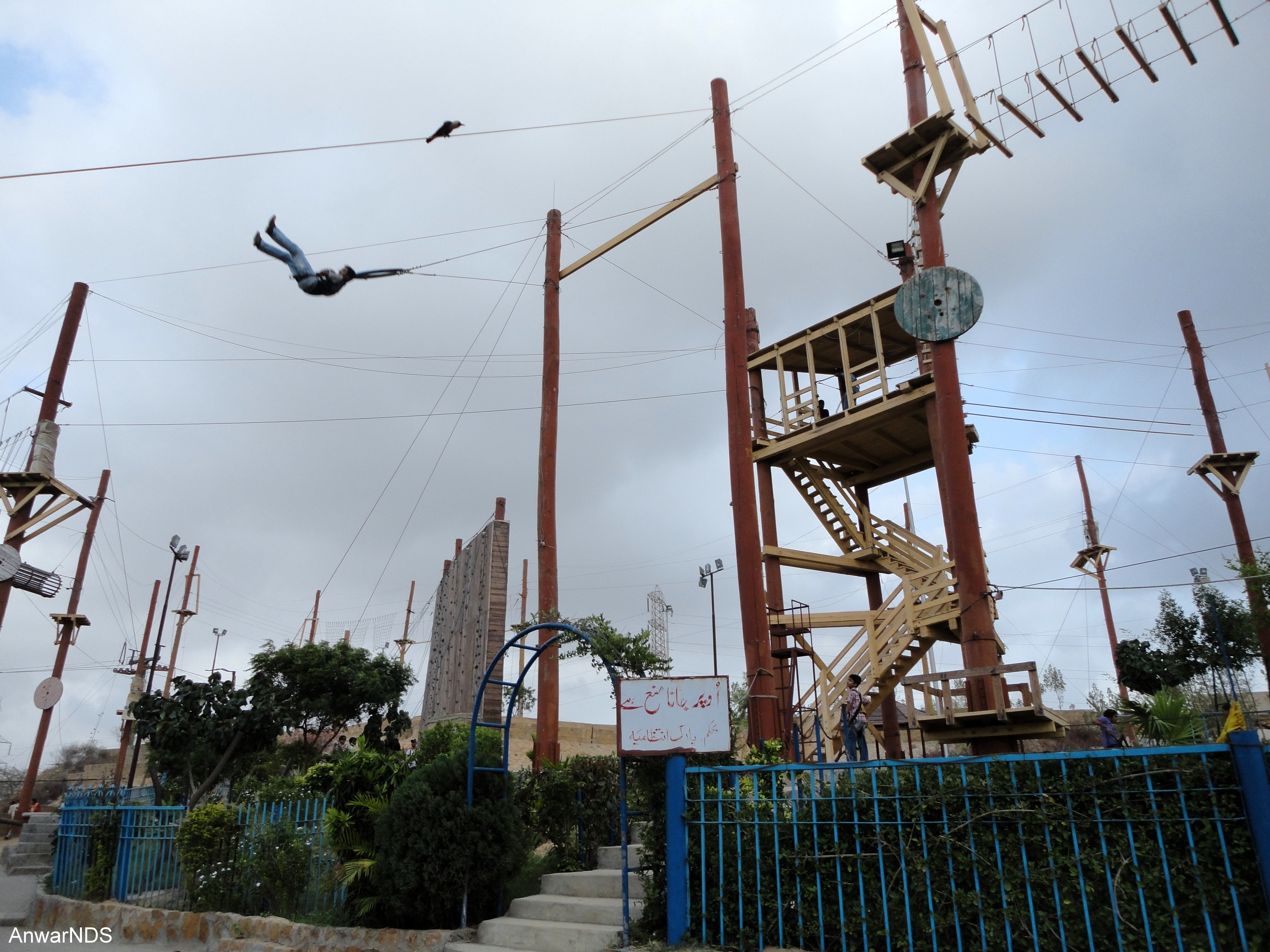
- A view of Go Aish Adventure Park
- Interactive map of Go Aish Adventure Park
- Type: Adventure park Theme park
- Location: Adjacent to Safari Park, Karachi, Karachi, Sindh, Pakistan
- Nearest city: Karachi
- Coordinates: 24°55′20″N 67°06′30″E
- Status: Defunct
- Facilities: Ropes course, Paintball, Quad biking, Indoor climbing, Mini golf

Go Aish Adventure Park was a theme park in Karachi, Sindh, Pakistan, adjacent to Safari Park, Karachi inaugurated by Governor Sindh Dr. Ishrat Ul Ebad Khan. The park is permanently closed.

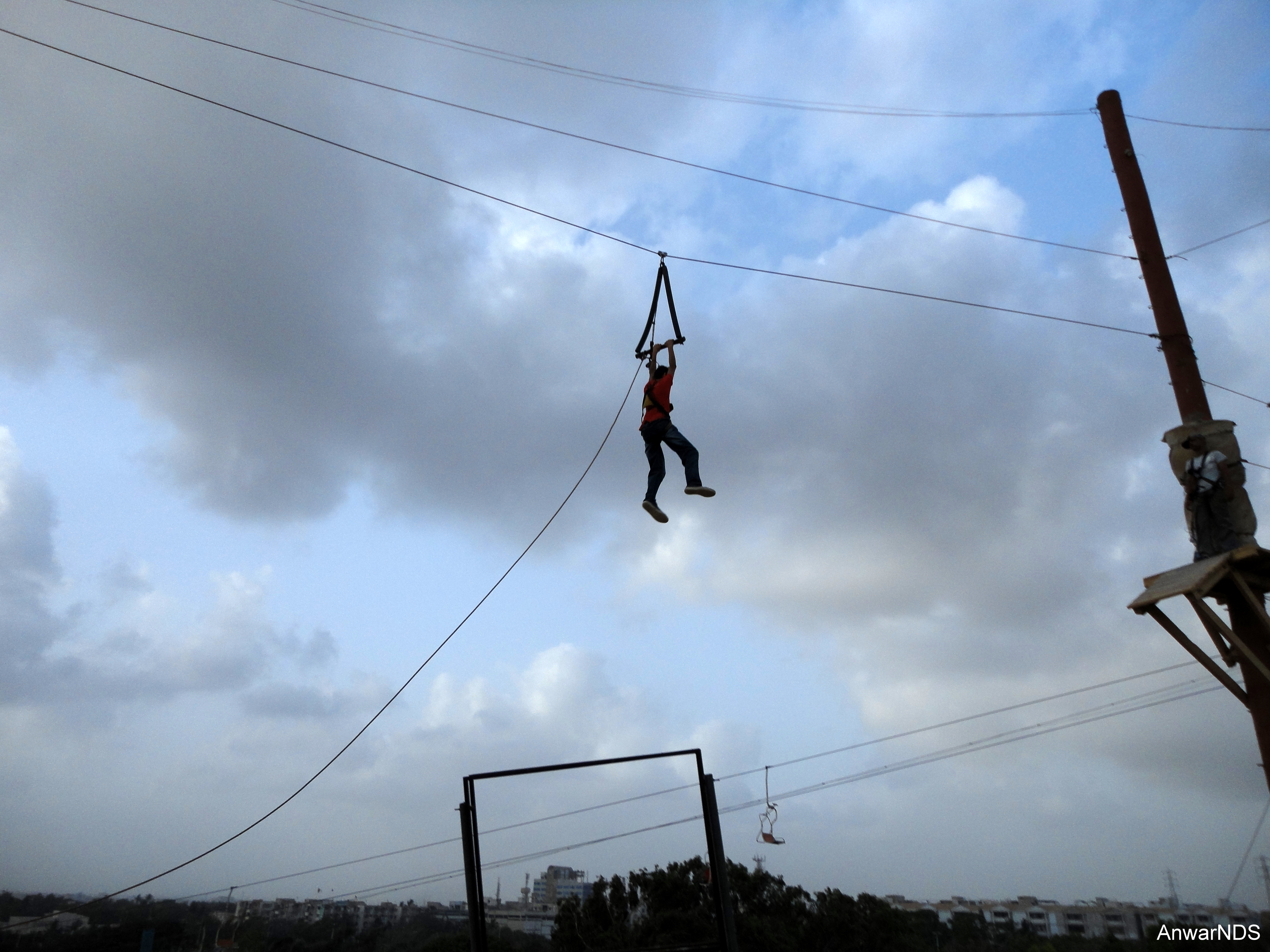
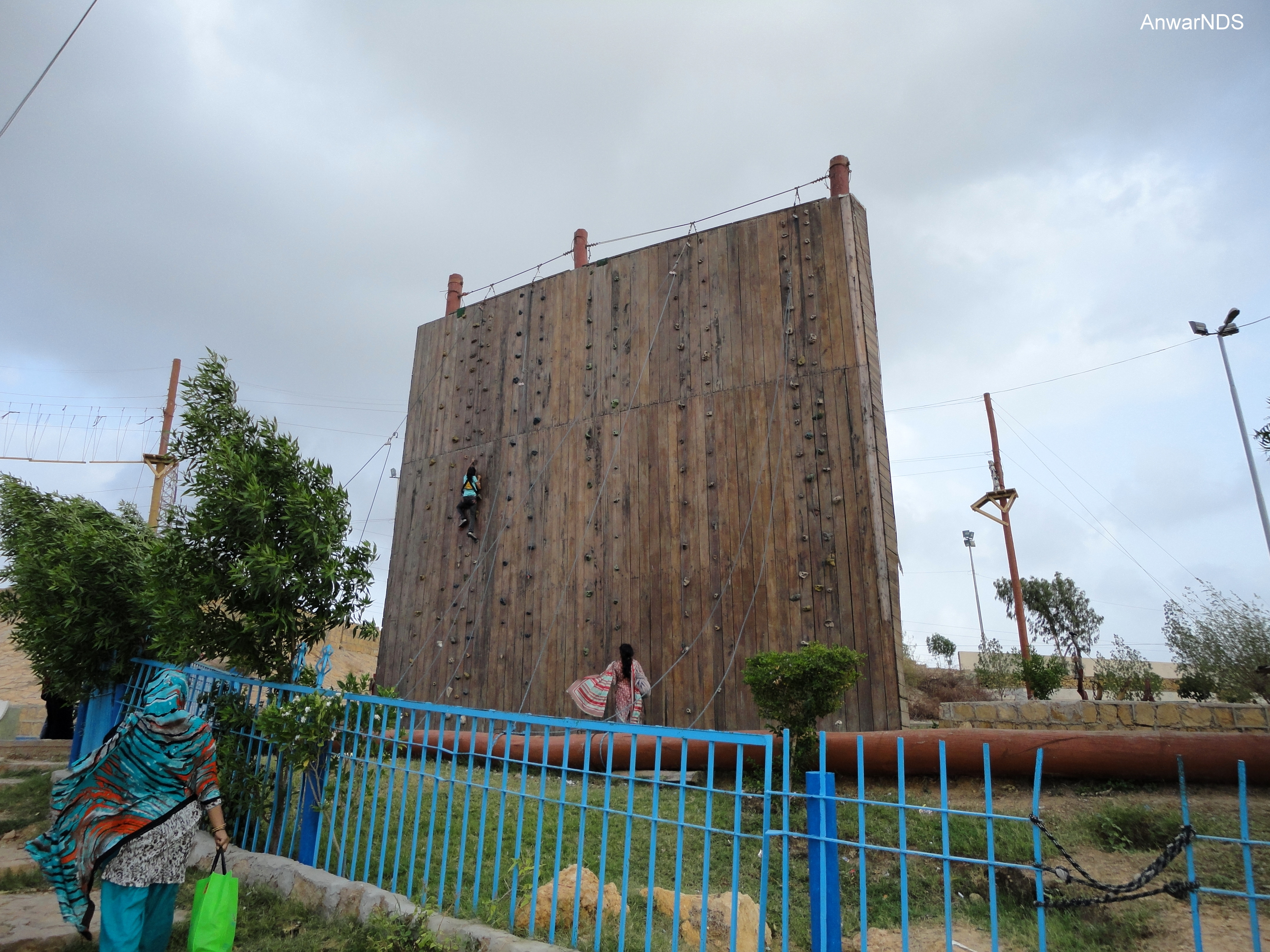
Rope Course and Indoor climbing at Go Aish Park

The park consisted of Ropes Course, Paintballing, Quad Biking, Indoor climbing and Mini golfing sections.

== See also ==
- List of parks and gardens in Pakistan
- List of parks and gardens in Lahore
- List of parks and gardens in Karachi
