= Rahim Yar Khan Wildlife Park =

Wildlife park in Rahim Yar Khan, Pakistan

- پارک حیات وحش رحیم‌یارخان
- Interactive map of Rahim Yar Khan Wildlife Park
- 28.40378°N 70.25965°E
- Date opened: 1986
- Location: Kacha Sadiqabad Road, Rahim Yar Khan, Punjab, Pakistan
- Land area: 15 acres (6.1 ha)
- No. of animals: Varies
- Memberships: Punjab Wildlife Department
- Major exhibits: Nilgai, Chinkara, Blackbuck, Peafowl, Rhesus macaque

Rahim Yar Khan Wildlife Park (Urdu: پارک حیات وحش رحیم‌یارخان) is a public wildlife park and zoological garden situated on Kacha Sadiqabad Road near Tibbi Larran, about seven kilometres south-east of the city of Rahim Yar Khan in the Punjab province of Pakistan.

Occupying roughly 6.1 ha (15 acres) of semi-arid land, it was opened by the Punjab Wildlife Department in 1986 as part of a provincial initiative to decentralise zoological facilities. Despite a mandate that includes recreation, education and captive breeding, the park has drawn repeated criticism for under-funding, deteriorating infrastructure and animal welfare lapses.

== History ==
The present site of Rahim Yar Khan Wildlife Park was chosen in the mid-1980s when district authorities pledged an all-weather approach road and canal water for irrigation. The park opened to the public in 1986 with bears, nilgai, chinkara, rhesus macaques, baboons and Indian peafowl. A 2009 Dawn investigation described the boundary wall as crumbling, the sole tubewell out of order and visitor numbers in decline, compelling the transfer of several species to larger zoos in Lahore and Bahawalpur.

In 2011, the provincial government allocated development funds for new cages, lawns and play equipment, but an April 2016 inspection found rusting materials still unused and lawns dried up because the promised turbine had not been installed. The park administration at that time requested Rs 21.438 million for rehabilitation and extra keepers, but the scheme lapsed without full funding.

Public scrutiny intensified on 8 August 2023 after a visitor's viral video showed carcasses of deer and langur left unburied, prompting deputy commissioner to order an inquiry and condemn "the worst failure" of the park's management. On 13 August 2023, caretaker Wildlife Minister Bilal Afzal directed the South Punjab Wildlife Directorate to submit a detailed report by 16 August and warned that officials could face action under the Punjab Wildlife Act 1974.

== Species ==
In 2009, it housed 25 chinkara, 18 nilgai, 10 rhesus macaques, seven spotted deer, 20 peafowl and a single baboon. By 2016, reporters counted 119 peafowl, 15 black deer, two barnacle geese, two blackbuck antelope, three monkeys, 16 ducks, two nilgai and a grey heron, many in weakened condition owing to inadequate feed and brackish water. Rescue operations occasionally augment the collection: on 18 November 2024, wildlife staff took in a wounded Eurasian griffon vulture (Gyps fulvus) captured near the M-5 Motorway for rehabilitation at the park.
