= Kamalia Wildlife Park =

Wildlife park in Toba Tek Singh District, Pakistan

- کمالیہ وائلڈ لائف پارک
- 30°42′53″N 72°40′26″E
- Date opened: 1992; 33 years ago
- Location: Fateh Abad Road, Kamalia, Toba Tek Singh District, Punjab, Pakistan
- Land area: 14 acres (5.7 ha)
- No. of animals: Variable (see §Species)
- Memberships: Punjab Wildlife Department
- Major exhibits: African lion, Nilgai, Blackbuck, Mouflon sheep, Peafowl

Kamalia Wildlife Park (Urdu: کمالیہ وائلڈ لائف پارک) is a public wildlife park and zoological garden on Fateh Abad Road, about two kilometres east of the city of Kamalia in Punjab, Pakistan.

== History ==
Kamalia Wildlife Park was developed between 1991 and 1992 at a cost of Rs 4.836 million to conserve indigenous fauna in naturalistic enclosures and to provide the district's only large-scale recreational green space. Pairs of lions, tigers, mouflon sheep, blackbuck, black bears, zebras, monkeys, deer and a variety of waterfowl were introduced during the inaugural stocking, while landscaped lawns, a boating lake and children’s swings formed part of the original visitor infrastructure.

In 2017, however, reporters found the park "in a shambles": the lake had become a rubbish pit, fountains and wash-rooms lay defunct and animal numbers had fallen sharply amid chronic funding shortfalls. By 2018, the park still kept five lions but recorded the death of a 15-month-old lioness from rabies despite quarantine and vaccination efforts, prompting veterinary screening of staff who had handled the cub.

In 2022, provincial wildlife officials again came under scrutiny when an The Express Tribune survey of Punjab zoos noted that Kamalia still housed four African lions but lacked the diversity needed to sustain visitor interest and highlighted the stalled transfer programme for surplus big cats from Lahore Zoo.

== Species ==
Official inventories are irregular, but a 2017 on-site assessment listed just two lions, one blackbuck, one blue bull, two Himalayan black bears, six rhesus macaques and "a few" birds, including Indian peafowl. Subsequent media reports show some recovery in carnivore numbers: four African lions were present in 2022, but herbivores and aviary species remain sparse. Academic sampling undertaken in 2022 confirmed the presence of captive Mouflon sheep (Ovis orientalis) at Kamalia as part of a province-wide study of tick-borne pathogens in zoo ungulates.
