= Murree Wildlife Park =

Zoo in Pakistan

Murree Wildlife Park (پارک حیات وحش مری) is a wildlife park located in Bansra Gali, in Murree Pakistan. This Park was initially inaugurated under the National Development Scheme 'Development of Wildlife Park' in 1986. The wildlife park provides canteens and cafeterias for the tourists and visitors.

== Demographics ==
The Murree Wildlife Park covers an area of 97 hectares (240 acres).

== Species list ==
The wildlife park has the below listed species:

Mammals

- Siberian tiger
- Red deer
- Yak(Bos gruniens)
- Asian black bear
- Bactrian camel
- Chital
- Chinkara
- Sambar

Birds

- Black Shoulder Peafowl (Pavo cristatus)
- Guinea fowl (Numididae)
- Green Pheasant (Phasianus versicolor)

== Gallery ==
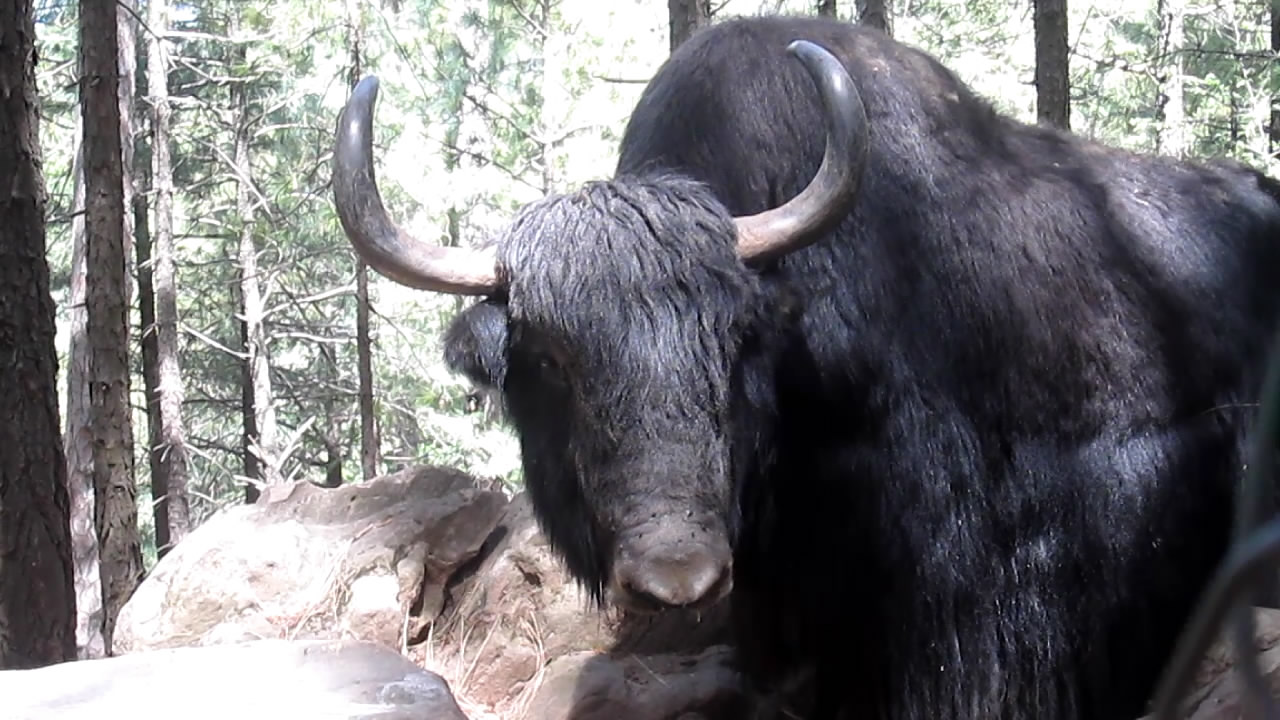

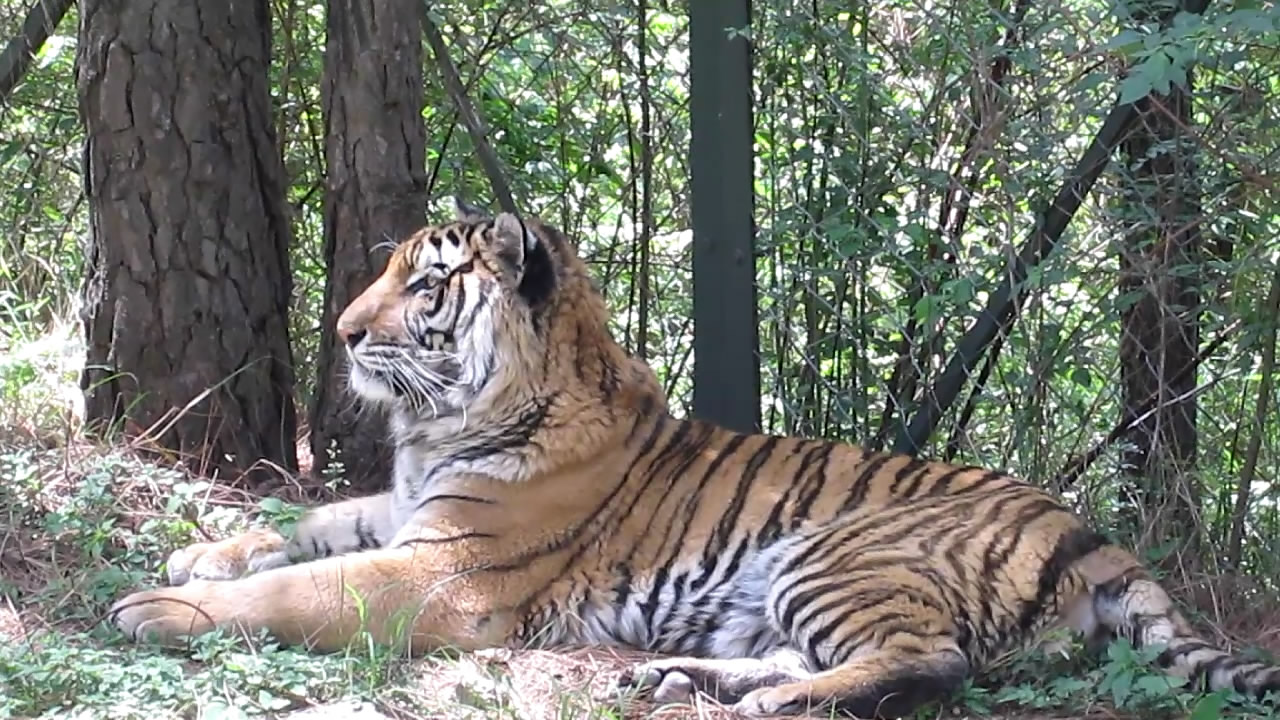
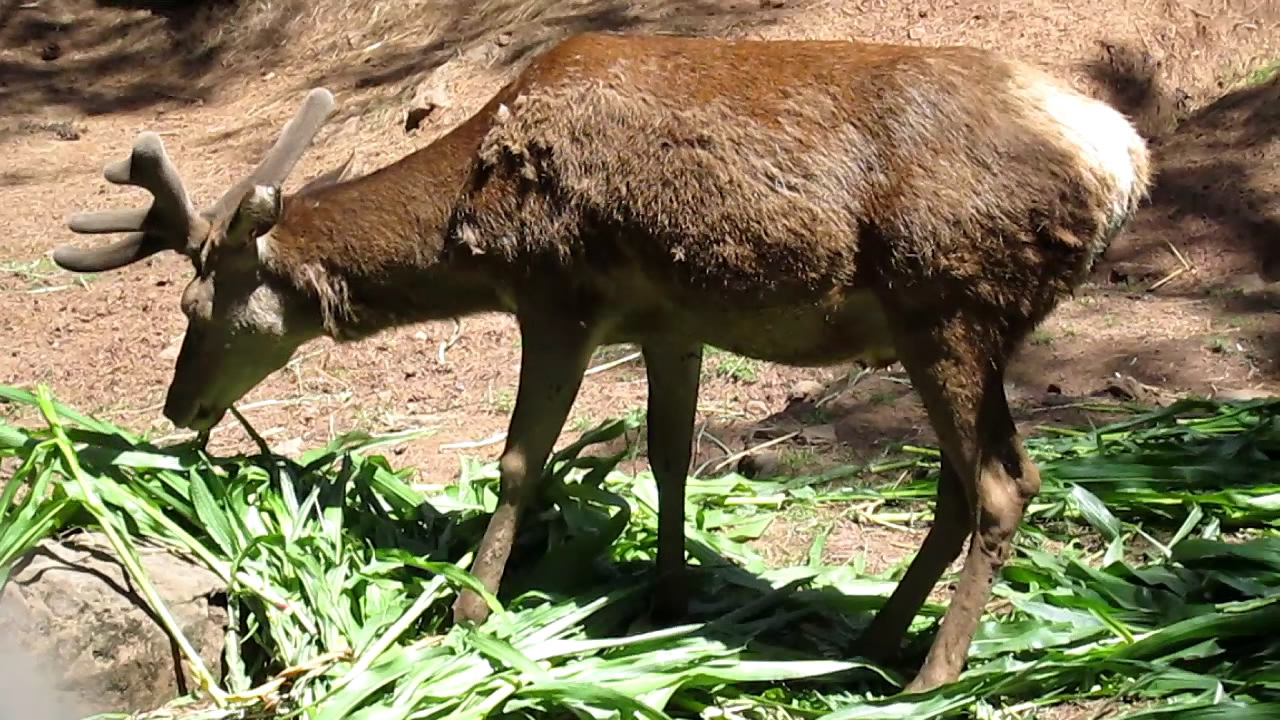
