= Changa Manga =

Nature reserve in Pakistan

Changa Manga Punjabi: چھانگا مانگا
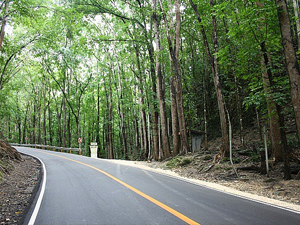

Geography
- Location: Chunian Tehsil Kasur District and Lahore District, Punjab, Pakistan
- Coordinates: 31°05′N 73°58′E
- Area: 5,065 hectares (12,515 acres)

Administration
- Established: 1866
- Authority: Punjab Forest Department, Government of Punjab, Pakistan

Ecology
- WWF Classification: Indomalayan realm
- Indicator plants: Dalbergia sissoo (Sheesham), Acacia nilotica (Kikar), Morus alba (White mulberry), Bombax ceiba (Simal).
- Fauna: 14 mammalian species (including hog deer, jackal, mouflon, nilgai and wild boar), 50 birds (including Indian peafowl, Gyps bengalensis and other Asiatic vultures), six reptiles, two amphibians and 27 insect species.

The Changa Manga (Urdu, Punjabi: چھانگا مانگا) is a man-made forest which includes a wildlife preserve. It is located in Tehsil Chunian, District Kasur of Punjab, Pakistan. It is located approximately 74 km west of Lahore. It was once the largest man-made forest in the world but has undergone illegal deforestation at a massive scale in recent times.

Changa Manga is known more widely as "one of the oldest hand-planted forests in the world", and hosts a wide range of flora and fauna. The forest is home to 14 species of mammals, 50 species of birds, six species of reptiles, two species of amphibians and 27 species of insects. Thus, other than producing timber for the local industry, the forest also serves as an important wildlife reserve.

Named after two brother dacoits, the Changa Manga forest was originally planted in 1866 by British foresters. Its trees were harvested to gather fuel and resources for the engines employed in the North-Western railway networks.

== Onomatology of name ==
The name of the forest is derived from an amalgamation of the names of two brother dacoits (bandits), Changa and Manga. The dacoits were a constant source of terror for the "law-abiding citizens" of the districts in the 19th century as they would "hold up and plunder" any passing trader. The robbers had a den in the "secret heart" of the forest where they sought shelter from the British authorities. The robbers were eventually captured by the police and became the inspiration for the name of the forest site. Soon afterwards, the Salvation Army opened up a camp at the forest site as a place for reformation of criminals.

== Location ==
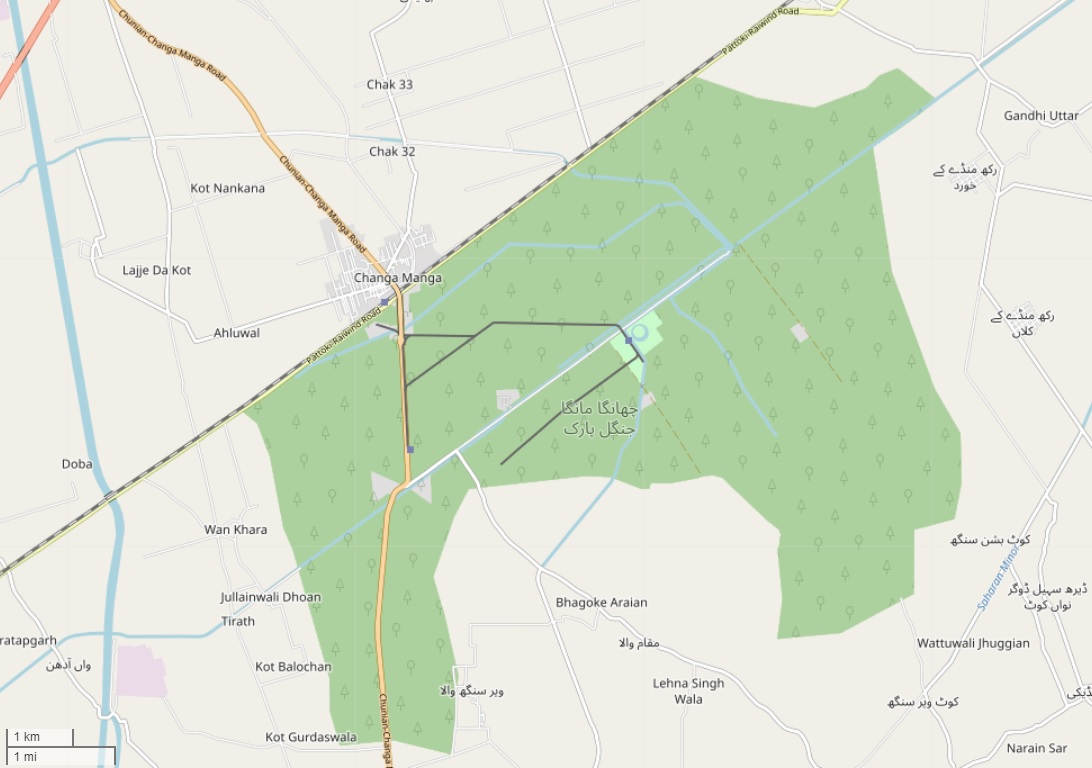
Map of Changa Manga Forest

The Changa Manga forest can be reached from a road off the N-5 Highway near Bhai Pheru and Chunian. At present, the forest covers an area of 48.6 square kilometres (12,000 acres). It was once the largest man-made forest in the world but massive deforestation has reduced it to less than half its original size. It is also known as "one of the oldest hand-planted forests in the world".

The forest plantation dates back to 1866 and was planned to fill the need for timber and fuel resources for the North-Western railway networks. The most common species of flora are Dalbergia sissoo (Sheesham) and Acacia nilotica (Kikar), both members of the Fabaceae and native to the Indian subcontinent. Morus alba (white mulberry) was also introduced to the plantation and became popular in cultivation throughout South Asia. The forest also has several species of Eucalyptus and Populus.

== History ==
=== Allocation of land ===
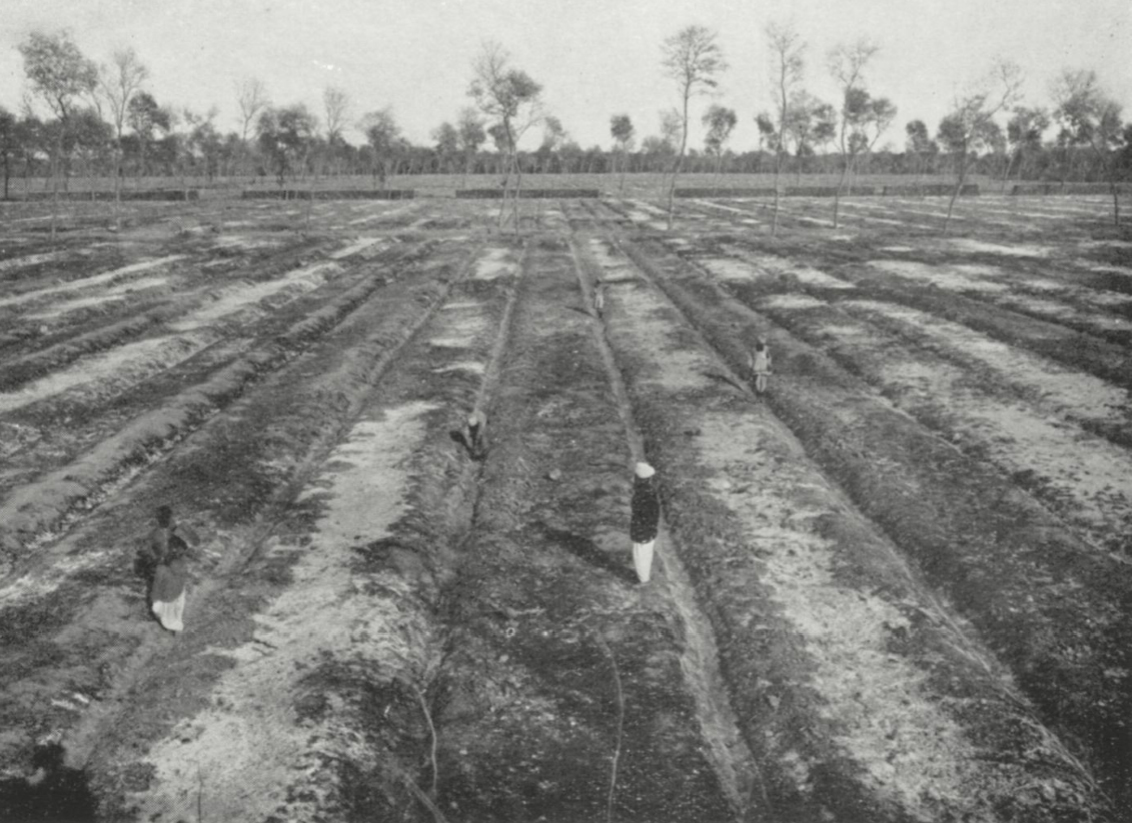
Throughout the Punjab plains, the dry scrubs and thorn forests were slashed and burnt to make way for an irrigated plain on which to cultivate the forest plantations.

In 1864, the North-Western Railway found itself starved of resources, vital in running services on its network. It was then that Dr John Lindsay Stewart, the first Conservator of Forests of Punjab, recommended the allocation of a block of land for each railway district where forest plantations should be cultivated to cater for such growing demands. Such a block of land was allocated for the Kasur district at the Chunian tehsil on the Lahore-Karachi railway line. This land was allocated on the assumption that 339.37 cubic meters per hectare of mature crop on a 15-year rotation would adequately suffice the five trains running daily on these lines, consuming 36 kilograms (80 lb) of fuel per train.

This particular area of land was a semi-desert scrub jungle with thorn forest land and a light alluvial soil that only required the introduction of water to yield crops. The land was mostly populated by the Gondhal and Sansi gypsies, whom British called "junglies" (a derogatory term meaning 'jungle-dwelling barbarians'). The British replaced the population of the Gondhals and Sansis with an influx of cultivators from older cultivated lands and other provinces.

In preparation for cultivation, the land was slashed and burnt to rid the landscape of thorn forest and dry scrub growth. The unruly scrubs of the dry jungles were gradually turned into plains ready for irrigation.

=== Initial plantation ===
Within the premises of the allocated land, the German forester Berthold Ribbentrop, Inspector General of Forests in British India, identified a dry forest area where long rooted bar trees could exist. He planned to cultivate the land with the plantation of Morus alba (white mulberry) and Dalbergia sissoo (sheesham). The plantation of the forest began in 1866 but failed to obtain substantial harvest from the initial wooded area of 3,399 hectares (8,400 acres).

In 1868, Charles Frederick Amery, an officer in the Indian Forestry Commission, had an idea of employing a trench and ridge system. Ribbentrop adopted the system making the plantation a "sylvicultural and financial success". The plantation reaped its first successful harvest in 1888 from a second crop rotation. The site was soon identified as a sustainable source for timber, primarily serving the North-Western railway network.

=== Railway and logistics ===
By 1870, the irrigated plantation had grown to 3,694 hectares (9,129 acres) and was served by the primary railway station for the Chunian tehsil on the Lahore-Karachi railway line. To benefit logistics for logging operations, it was decided to build a railway station at Changa Manga. A special 610 millimetres (2.00 ft) gauge railway, called the Changa Manga Forestry Railway, was established for narrow gauge logging operations.

The railway employed the use of wood-burning steam locomotives built by John Fowler & Co., of Leeds. When burning wood from an engine set fire to a van and buggy, the locomotives were upgraded to coal-powered types. Even with such incidents, the demand for wood from Changa Manga remained steady as its supply base grew across the timber market in India.

The railway is still operational today and is only used to either transport timber or haul tourists on special occasions. Amongst the three engines, operational to date, are two from John Fowler & Co. and one from Andrew Barclay Sons & Co. of Kilmarnock, Scotland.

=== Great Indian Famine of 1876–78 ===
The years 1876–78 saw intense drought sweep across much of India, and in particular the Deccan Plateau. The famine was a result of crop failures throughout the plateau. The failure to provide food to the millions of hungry countrymen during the famine was blamed primarily on the absence of adequate rail infrastructure and thus the British administration sought to expand its rail infrastructure. Though some parts of Punjab were also affected by the famine, firewood from Changa Manga grew in demand to supply the growing network of rail infrastructure.

=== Salvation Army Silk Camp ===
The early 1800s saw many Indian traders invest in the silk trade. Most of the silk in India came from silkworms cultivated at Moradabad near Delhi. However, businessmen deemed the Delhi silk as "lacking lustre" and they ventured into silk experiments elsewhere across the country. One such silk experiment was conducted by Commissioner Frederick Booth-Tucker of The Salvation Army at Changa Manga in 1912. It came to be known as the Salvation Army Silk Camp.

Booth-Tucker brought along hundred ounces of silkworm eggs (about 3 million eggs) from France. To house the worms, he created long sheds from bamboo and dried grass. The worms' feed consisted entirely of mulberry leaves obtained from felled trees in the forest. The worms fed on 70 hundredweights of leaves a day.

In 1916, the Governor of Punjab Sir Michael O'Dwyer visited the silk experiment where the silkworms had started developing cocoons. The governor left pleased with Booth-Tucker's work. The Salvation Army Silk Camp remained a sustainable venture for a year after the governor's visit, although changes to the climate later led to its decline.

== Wildlife conservation and breeding ==
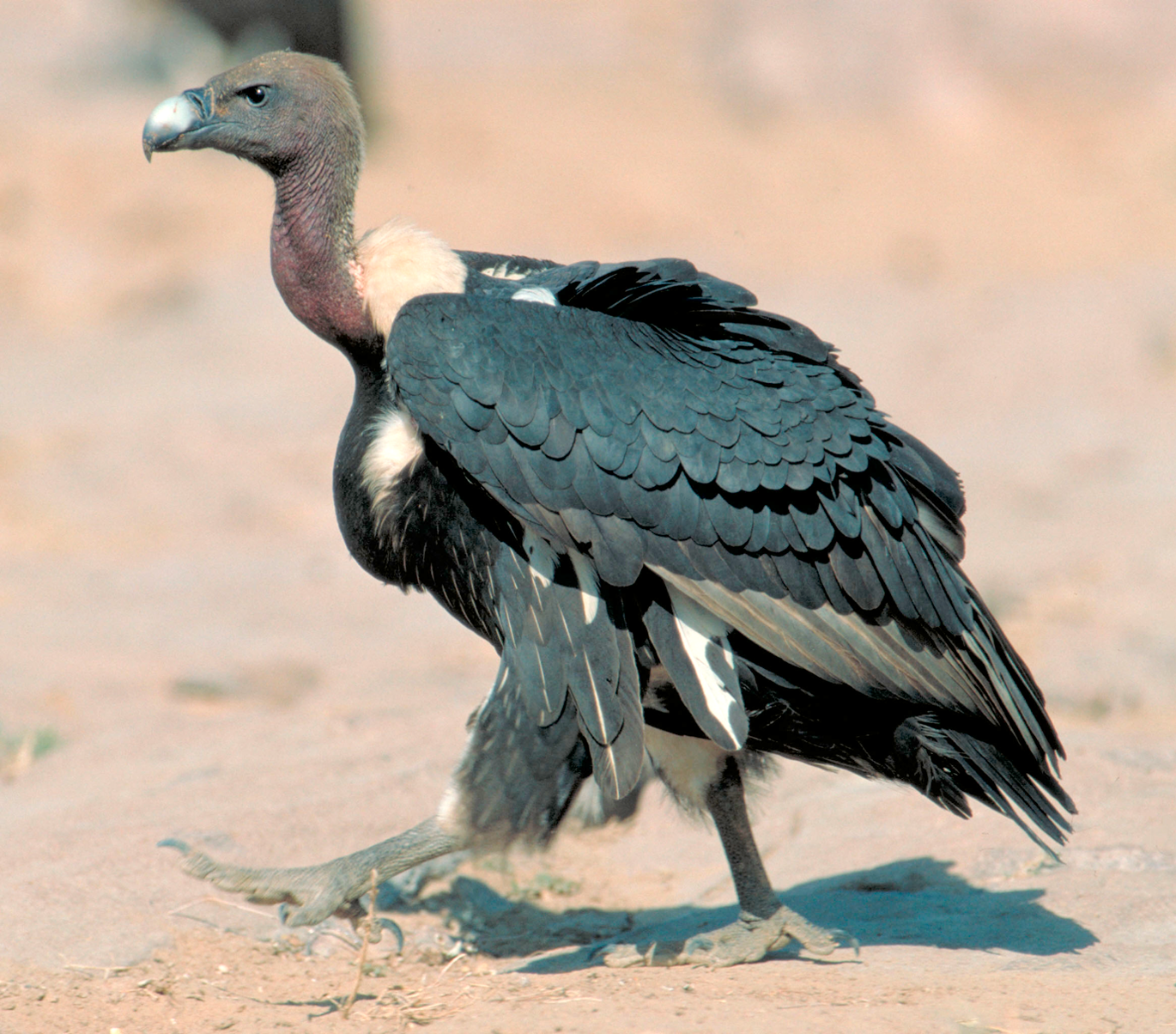
Changa Manga has a conservation centre for the Gyps bengalensis (white-rumped vultures) which are a critically endangered species of Asiatic vultures.

The forest serves as a conservation and breeding centre for the critically endangered species of Asiatic vultures, Gyps bengalensis (white-rumped vultures). It hosts a conservation centre in association with WWF SAVE (Saving Asia's Vultures from Extinction) programme, an international effort across India, Nepal and Pakistan. The Asiatic vulture species of G. bengalensis and G. indicus have reportedly seen a decline by "more than 90 per cent in Pakistan, India and Nepal", thereby making the conservation efforts at Changa Manga extremely crucial for the survival of these vulture species.

=== Gyps Vulture Conservation Centre ===
There is a Vulture Conservation Centre in a secluded area of the Changa Manga forest. The centre has been specifically designed to manage the population of G. bengalensis. The centre operates the Gyps Vulture Restoration Programme under the management of WWF Pakistan and the Punjab Wildlife and Parks Department, with aid of the Environment Agency Abu Dhabi, Hawk Conservancy Trust and WWF USA. The vulture conservation programme was first realised in 2004 and this dedicated conservation centre became fully operational in 2007.

The centre holds up to fifteen G. benalgensis in its communal aviary, but has a capacity to hold 30 vultures in its four separate breeding aviaries. The communal aviary is 38m long and increases in width from 14m to 27.5m. The aviary contains live tree perches with roosting and nesting ledges, which also provides shade and shelter for birds.

=== Wildlife reserve ===
Changa Manga also has a wildlife reserve that covers an area of 16 hectares (40 acres), built in 2008. The reserve is home to hog deer, Indian peafowl, golden jackal, mouflon, nilgai and wild boar. The Changa Manga wildlife preserve is one of the three wildlife parks located in the Lahore Division, the other two being Jallo Wildlife Park and Lahore Zoo Safari and also called as Woodland wildlife Parks.

== Recreation ==
Parts of the forest have now been developed into a recreation park with a railroad that gives the visitor a 5-kilometre (3.1 mi) ride on a miniature train through the forest. Other attractions include a water turbine, a waterfall, a children's play area, and a lake called 'Lunar Lake', where boating is possible. Changa Manga Tourist Resort is situated 45 kilometres (28 mi) from Lahore city. The Tourism Development Corporation of Punjab (TDCP) arranges picnic trips to Changa Manga throughout the year.

== Deforestation ==
The world's largest artificial forest is being heavily logged, and so far by 2011 more than 60 percent of Changa Manga Wildlife Park has been deforested.

== Revival of Changa Manga Forest ==
On 11 November 2011, a media report covered rapid deforestation in Changa Mhanga Forest and exposed how unbridled timber mafia in connivance with the forest officials was rapidly deforesting the world's largest man-made forest. The Chief Ombudsman, Punjab, Javed Mehboob took suo moto notice of the case. A series of news stories were followed until 24 June 2012, when Punjab Chief Minister Shehbaz Sharif ordered the removal of Chief Conservator (Forest) Dr Mehboobur Rehman and Conservator (Forest) Rao Khalid from their posts.

The chief minister also ordered the Punjab Anti-Corruption Establishment DG and the CM Inspection Team (CMIT) chairman to carry out a joint investigation into the deforestation by timber mafia and ferret out facts about their possible links with the forest authorities. The CM also ordered an investigation into the issue from 1990 onward. The team was directed to investigate all the DFOs, posted at Changa Manga since 1990. Similarly, the team was directed to investigate all SDOs, Block Officers and Forest Guards who had been working there since then. Police subsequently made some arrests.

However, all of the accused got bail from the courts, were cleared of the charges or received minor penalties. The Ombudsman issued a detailed report on the case affixing para wise responsibility on those who were responsible for the worst affairs and CMIT proceeded for criminal proceedings for the same, but everything went under the blanket and now almost all of the accused are working on the similar posts as ADHOC.

The culprits was to appoint them on the same posts as contract/daily wage/ ad hoc employees while they are still OSD, dismissed from service officially. Apart from this, however serious efforts the government somehow started to bring back Changa Manga to the list of world's largest artificial forests.

Changa Manga Forest could then safely be termed as having come back on track. Water scarcity was the first reason of plant disease and failure. The forest administration negotiated with the irritation department and took full sanctioned discharge of 113 cusecs for the forest for all seasons. This step alone brought very positive results and the forest grew green again.

Illegal animals were another source of forest destruction. There were mafias that used to use this forest as the grazing safari and hence all new plantation failed because of abundant illegal grazing. 864 Animals in this period were ejected from the forest on self-help basis as legislation for the same is still pending although a summary has been approved by the CM in this regard already.

To tackle the political and social mafias, the current administration kept a close liaison with the Chunian Cantt authorities who deployed army patrolling teams in the forest to help forest staff control the damage, illicit grazing and snubbing of notorious habitual offenders.

Two row boundary planting of large sized plants along the 39km boundary of the plantation including improvement of boundary road for patrolling has been completed. Barbed wire fencing of 30km along with the RCC posts on the boundary of the forest to check illegal movement has been completed. Planting of 9km large sized ornamental plants along tram line for aesthetic view of the visitors has been completed. Construction of main gates on the boundary of plantation to stop illegal movement has been completed. Construction of boundary wall with iron grill around forest park to secure 5000 Rft park area and 7050 Rft on the Wankhara side has been completed as well.

Additionally, afforestation of new plants was done on a 607 hectare blank area. It is pertinent to mention that an additional 1618 hectares is still pending afforestation that is expected to be started by next year. However, 150000 poplar plants have been recently planted on the road sides to give the forest a better look. In the same period 52 FIRs have been registered, however most of them are still pending investigation as the accused are, either themselves or family members of, prominent political figures of the area including Ch Mehmood Anwar and Rana Muhammad Ishaq Khan belonging to the ruling party of Punjab.

Changa Manga has long been waiting for all this. Now when things are back on track; it shall be expected that the authorities will not turn a blind eye towards affairs and will help forest administration in preventing culprits from further destroying the forest. Similarly, it is also recommended that encouragement rewards may be given to the current administration for doing honest efforts to save the forest.

According to Forest Department officials in April 2020, honey sales from Changa Manga wildlife preserve increased from Rs. 729,000 in the 2016-17 financial year to Rs. 1.3 million in the 2019-2020 financial year. This is asserted to be due to increased honeybee presence at the preserve as a result of Billion Tree Project afforestation efforts and decreased use of pesticides and industrial fertilizers in the vicinity of the region.

== See also ==
- Lahore Zoo Safari
- Forestry in Pakistan
- List of zoos in Pakistan
- List of parks and gardens in Lahore
- List of parks and gardens in Pakistan
- List of parks and gardens in Karachi
- Rakh Jhok Forest
