= Vehari Wildlife Park =

- پارک حیات وحش وہاڑی
- Interactive map of Vehari Wildlife Park
- 30.037376°N 72.350351°E
- Date opened: 1988
- Location: Eidgah Road, Vehari, Punjab, Pakistan
- Land area: 16 acres (6 ha)
- No. of animals: ~210
- No. of species: ~20
- Major exhibits: lions, blue bull, hog deer

Vehari Wildlife Park is a public wildlife park located in Vehari, Punjab, Pakistan.

== History ==
Vehari Wildlife Park was established in 1988 on an area of 6 hectares (16 acres) at a cost 3 million rupees by Government of Punjab.

== Species and animals ==
The park housed a total of 73 mammals of 7 species and 139 birds of 14 species back in 2004. These may have included captive lions, blue bull, hog deer, common peafowl, species of monkeys, rabbits, pheasants, waterfowls and parrots.

Group	Number of species	Number of animals
Mammals	07	73
Birds	14	139
Reptiles		
Amphibians		
Fish		
Invertebrates		
Total	21	212
