= DG Khan Zoo =

Coordinates: 30.04159110655285°N 70.62649824493393°E

D.G. Khan Zoo
- Interactive map of D.G. Khan Zoo
- Date opened: 1983-1985
- Location: Dera Ghazi Khan, Punjab, Pakistan
- Land area: 4.9 ha (12 acres)
- Website: https://www.fwf.punjab.gov.pk/dgkhan_zoo

D.G. Khan Zoo (Urdu: ڈيره غازى خان چڑیا گھر) is a zoo located in Dera Ghazi Khan, Punjab, Pakistan. It is operated by Forestry, Wildlife and Fisheries department, Punjab.

== History ==
It was established in 1983-1985 covering an area of 4.9 ha under the development scheme “Promotion of Wildlife and control of Hunting in D.G. Khan”. Now it has been re-named as “D.G. Khan Zoo”. In 2015, Provincial Minister of Punjab for Forestry, Wildlife and Fisheries, Muhammad Asif Malik, announced increased funding so that the zoo could purchase new animals.

== Facilities ==
- Amusement park
- Artificial waterfall
- Gazebo

== Species and animals ==
The zoo has several animals and birds including Olive Baboon, Rhesus Monkey, Lion, Emu, White Peafowl, Chukar partridge, Common Peafowl, and Grey Partridge.The Condition of animals are totally weak. Govt has to take some serious steps to improve the conditions. The cages in which animals are kept are too small and even are too dirty. There is no proper cleaning system.

== Entry fees and timing ==
Public can enter into park after paying entrance fees. The fees are Rs. 40 for adult and Rs. 20 for kids. There is also parking fee 30 for bikes and 50 for cars etc. Timing of zoo is 8 A.M. to sunset.

== See also ==
- Forestry, Wildlife and Fisheries department, Punjab
