= Jallo Park, Lahore =

Park in Pakistan

Jallo Wildlife Park, Lahore
- پارک حیات وحش جلو، لاہور
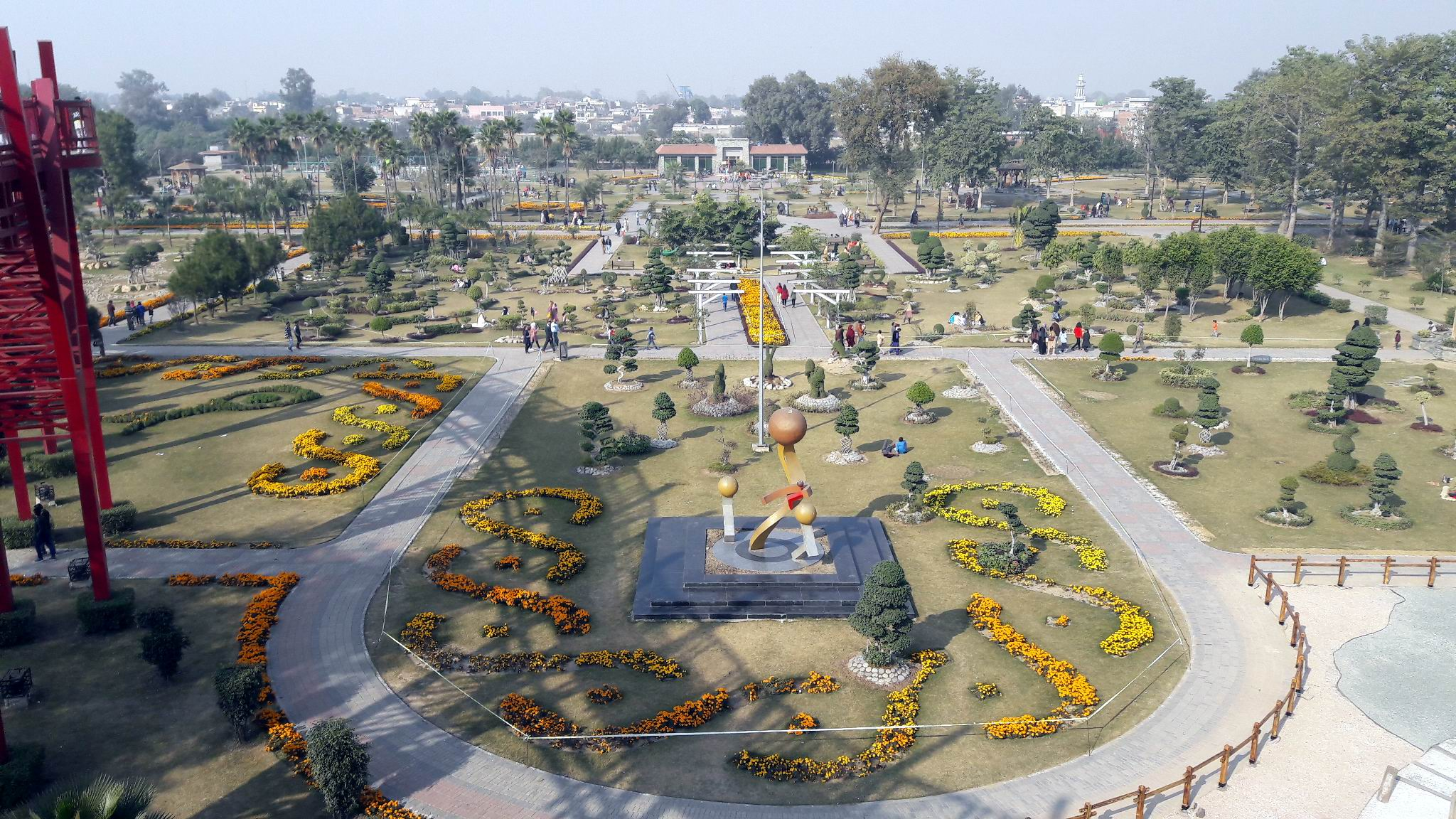
- Botanical Garden Jallo, Lahore
- Interactive map of Jallo Wildlife Park, Lahore
- Type: Recreation and wildlife park
- Location: Lahore District, Punjab, Pakistan
- Nearest city: 7 kilometres (4.3 mi) East to Lahore
- Coordinates: 31°34′21″N 74°28′38″E
- Area: 187 ha
- Created: 1978

Jallo Park, Lahore (sometimes called Jallo Wildlife Park, Lahore), established in 1978, is a public recreation and wildlife site located in Lahore District, Punjab, Pakistan.

Spread over an area of 187 hectares (461 acres), it is one of the three main wildlife parks located in Lahore, the other two being Changa Manga and Lahore Zoo Safari. The park is 7 kilometres (4.3 mi) east to Lahore city.

Facilities at Jallo Park include a Forest Research Centre, Wildlife Breeding Center, restaurants, coffee shops, a theme park, a sports complex, swimming pool, and a large lake for fishing and boating. It is currently funded by Punjab Wildlife and Parks Department of Government of Punjab. It is easily accessible by taxi, TransLahore buses and Lahore City Commuter trains that stop at Jallo Manhala Railway Station.

The area of 40.4 hectares is allotted to the Parks and Horticulture Authority, Lahore by Government of Punjab, Pakistan there. PHA established Botanical Garden Jallo and Butterfly House facility for the public. In 2022, Parks and Horticulture Authority, Lahore launched its Tree Plantation Drive to plant 30,000 trees.

== History ==
Jallo Park, Lahore was established in 1978 as a recreation park for public.

17 hectares (43 acres) of the park has been allocated as a breeding center for wildlife. In 2007, many sambar and chital deer were brought to the park for breeding. A number of birds, such as species of pheasants and parrots, were also added to the park.

In 2008, the Government of Punjab took steps for the development and beautification of the park. A sports complex was added which included courts for lawn tennis and volleyball, grounds for cricket and soccer, and a 50-kilometre (31 mi) track for bicycling. The park also has a public swimming pool.

== Jallo Park Railway Station ==
It is a busy railway station located in Jallo Park. It is one of the sub-urban stations of the Lahore city which are served by commuter trains of Lahore. A large number of commuters use this station to get access to the city of Lahore.

== Species list ==
- Aves and Birds
  - Common pheasant
  - Indian peafowl
  - Rock pigeon
- Mammals
  - Asian black bear
  - Bactrian camel
  - Chital
  - Chinkara
  - Sambar
  - Giraffe
  - Spotted Deer
- Reptiles
  - Indian cobra
  - Mugger crocodile

== Incidents ==
Between November 2007 and May 2008 as much as 80 captive birds died, reportedly due to poor hygiene, harsh weather, bad nutrition and lack of medical facilities. These included common pheasants, Indian peafowls and rock pigeons among others.

In July 2008, a driver was bitten by an Indian cobra and died afterwards. Similar incidents with resident animals and visitors were also reported in the park.

== See also ==
- List of parks and gardens in Lahore
- List of parks and gardens in Pakistan
- List of parks and gardens in Karachi
