= Landhi Korangi Zoo =

Landhi Korangi Zoo and Aquarium
- Interactive map of Landhi Korangi Zoo and Aquarium
- 24.826615°N 67.158657°E
- Date opened: 1990, September 18, 2012 (aquarium)
- Location: Korangi, Landhi Town, Karachi District, Sindh, Pakistan
- Land area: 2 ha
- Memberships: SAZARC

Korangi Zoo (Urdu: لانڈھی کورنگی چڑیا گھر) established in 1990, is a zoological garden located at Korangi, Landhi Town, Karachi District, Sindh, Pakistan. It is spread over an area of approximately 16,000 square metres (4 acres) and contains a fewer variety of animals compared to Karachi Zoo. The zoo operates under the City District Government Karachi and is a member of SAZARC.

In 2006, 4 million Pakistani rupees were allocated to the Landhi Korangi Zoo for bringing new animals, particularly a pair of lions. The management of Karachi Zoo also provided two pairs of plains zebra, one male and two female of the red-necked wallaby, one pair of Arabian oryx and two pairs of ostrich.

== Landhi Korangi Aquarium ==
In November 2004, construction plans for an aquarium, that had been on hold since 1992, were approved by nazim of the city. In June 2012, administrator of KMC, Muhammad Hussain Syed, told The Nation that the construction was going on speedily inside the Landhi Korangi Zoo. On September 18, 2012, Ishrat-ul-Ibad Khan, the Governor of Sindh, later inaugurated the Landhi Korangi Aquarium as the biggest aquarium in Pakistan to date.
