= Karachi Safari Park =

Zoo in Karachi, Pakistan

Safari Park, Karachi
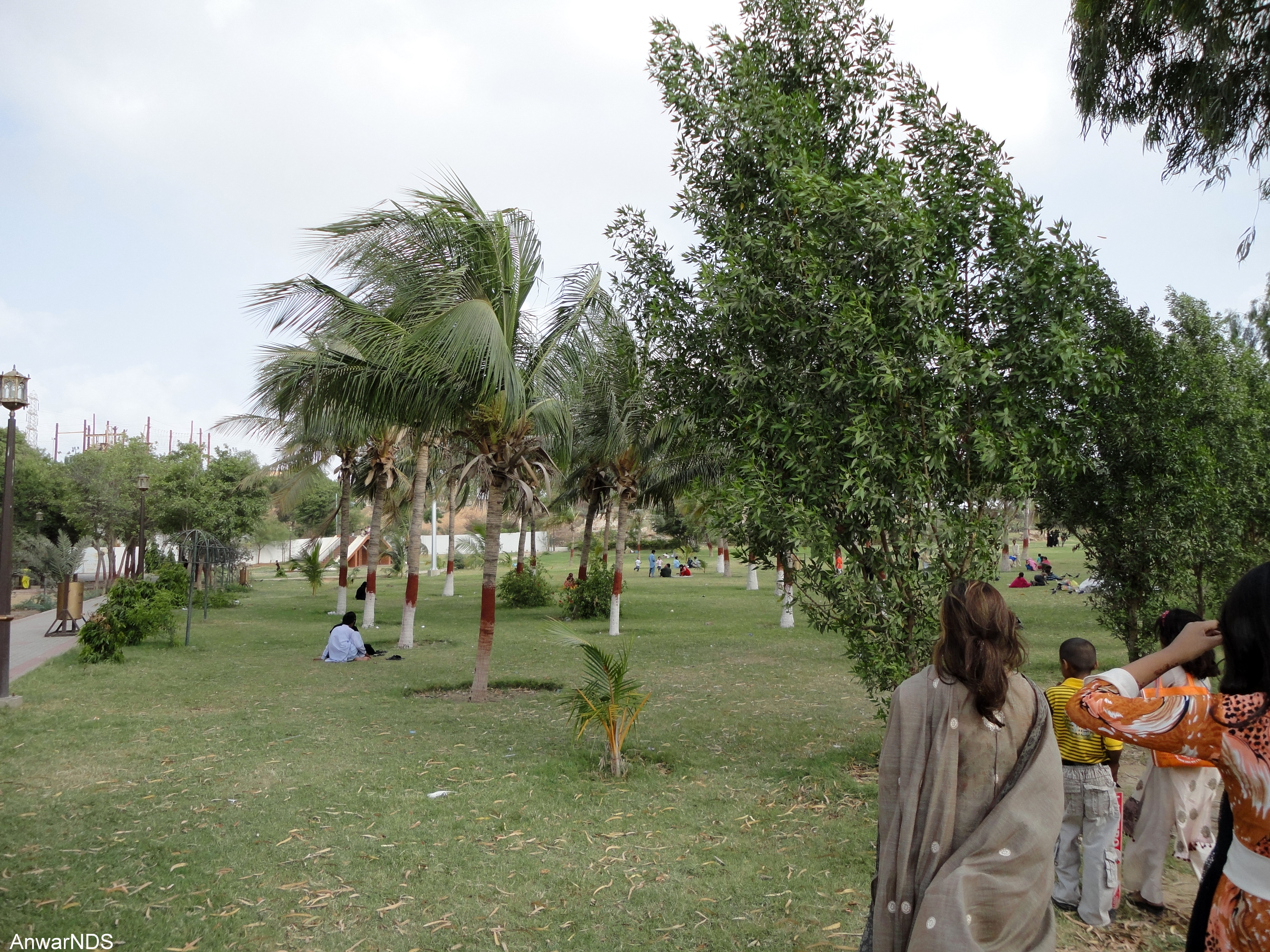
- Safari Park Karachi
- Interactive map of Safari Park, Karachi
- 24.92385°N 67.110666°E
- Date opened: 1970
- Location: Karachi, Sindh, Pakistan
- Land area: 148 acres (0.60 km^{2})
- Memberships: SAZARC

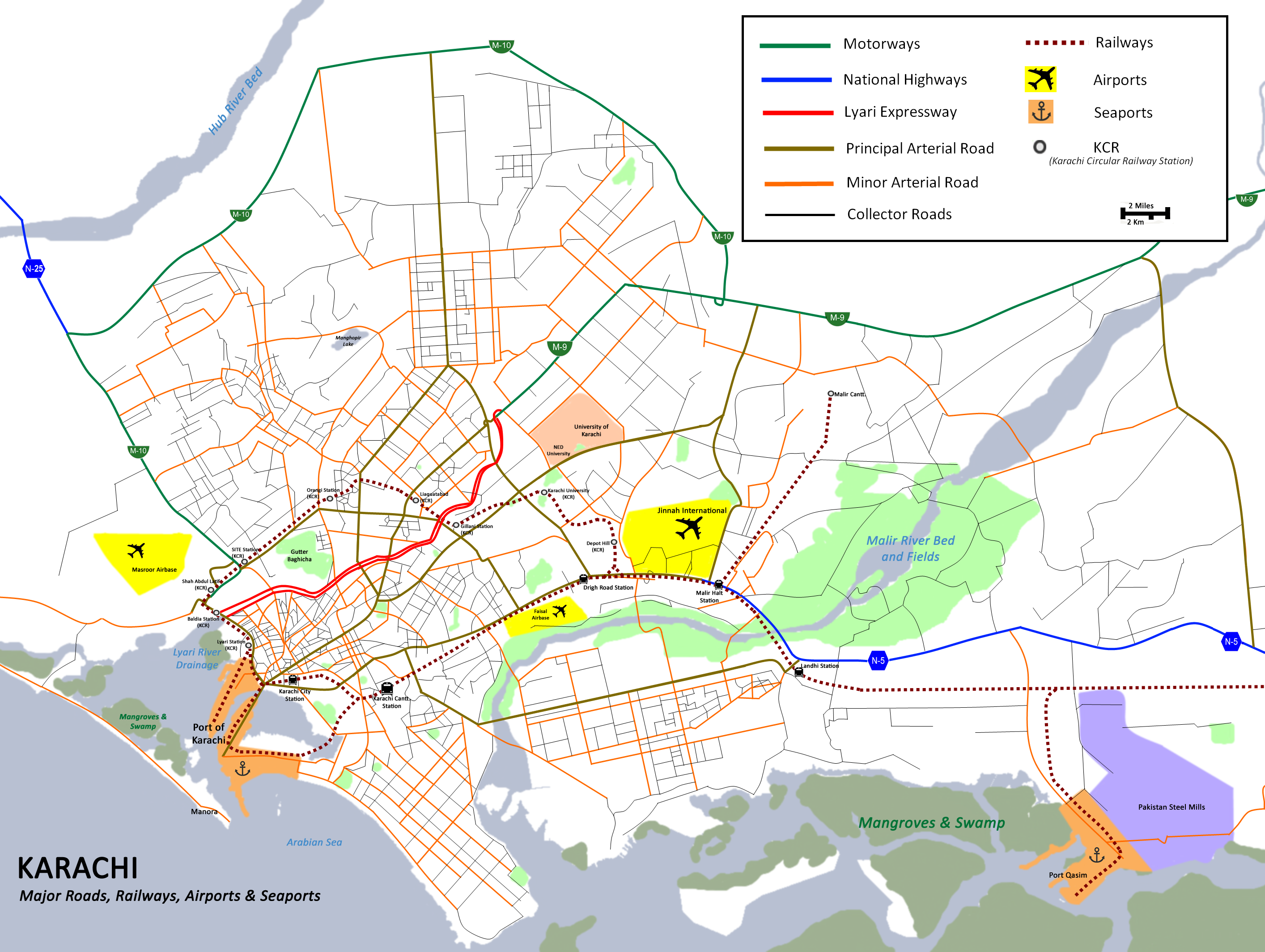
Location in Karachi

Karachi Safari Park (Urdu: کراچی سفاری پارک), opened in 1970, is a public-funded, 'family-only' safari park covering an area of 0.60 square kilometres (148 acres), located in Gulshan-e-Iqbal, Karachi, Sindh, Pakistan. It has a zoo, with viewing facilities like a chairlift and safari tracks, as well as two natural lakes.

== History ==
Karachi Safari Park was inaugurated in 1970 by Lieutenant General Atiq-ur-Rehman. It was an independent project of the then Karachi Municipal Corporation. The creation of an independent zoo, safari and aquarium department followed in 1995. Karachi Safari Park is now an independent wing of the Community Development Department of City District Government of Karachi (defunct) and has been designated as a 'family park'.

== Attractions ==
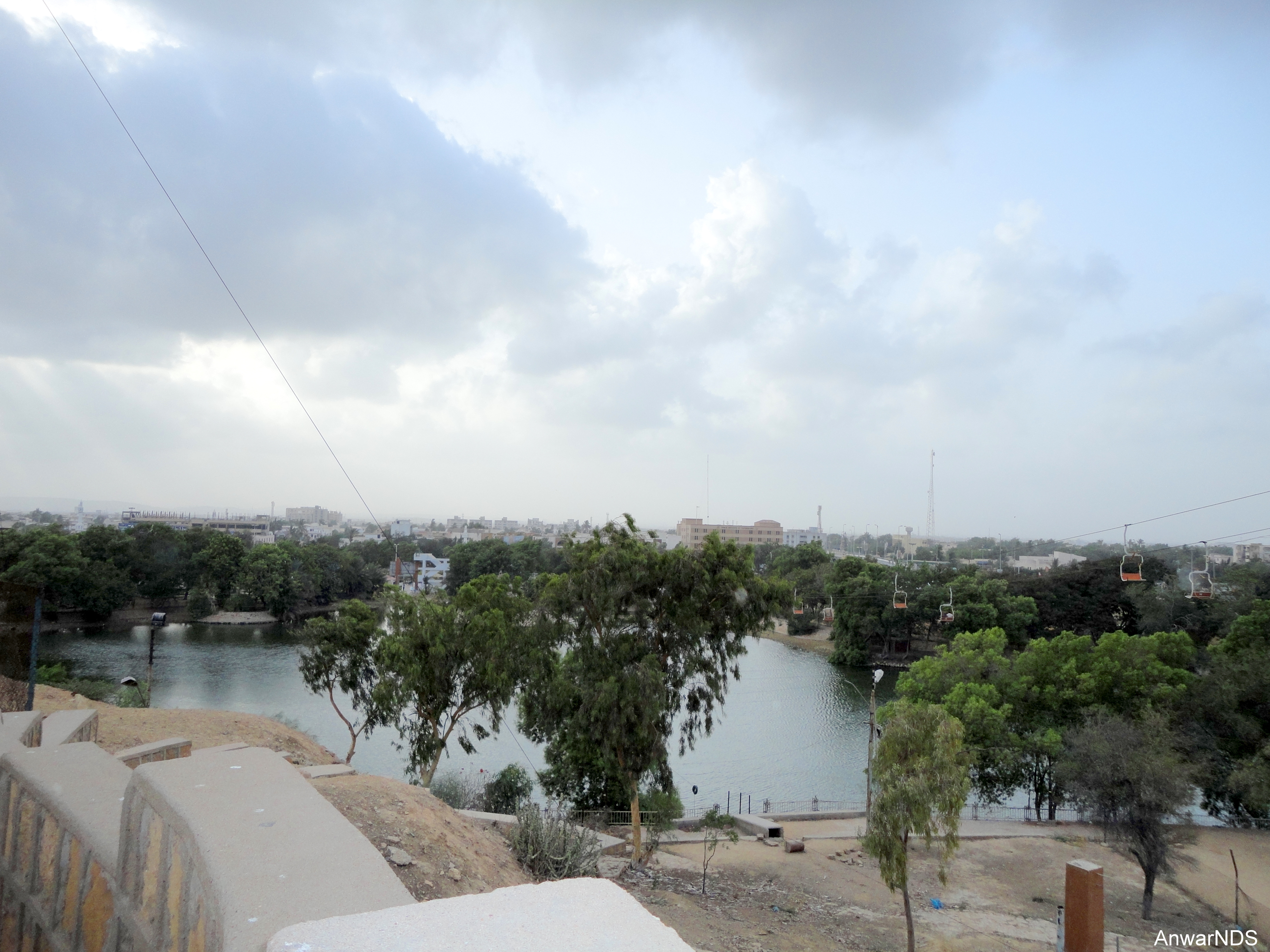
A view of Swan lake at Safari Park, Karachi

- Swan lake: A natural lake is located inside the safari park featuring a pagoda style sitting place.

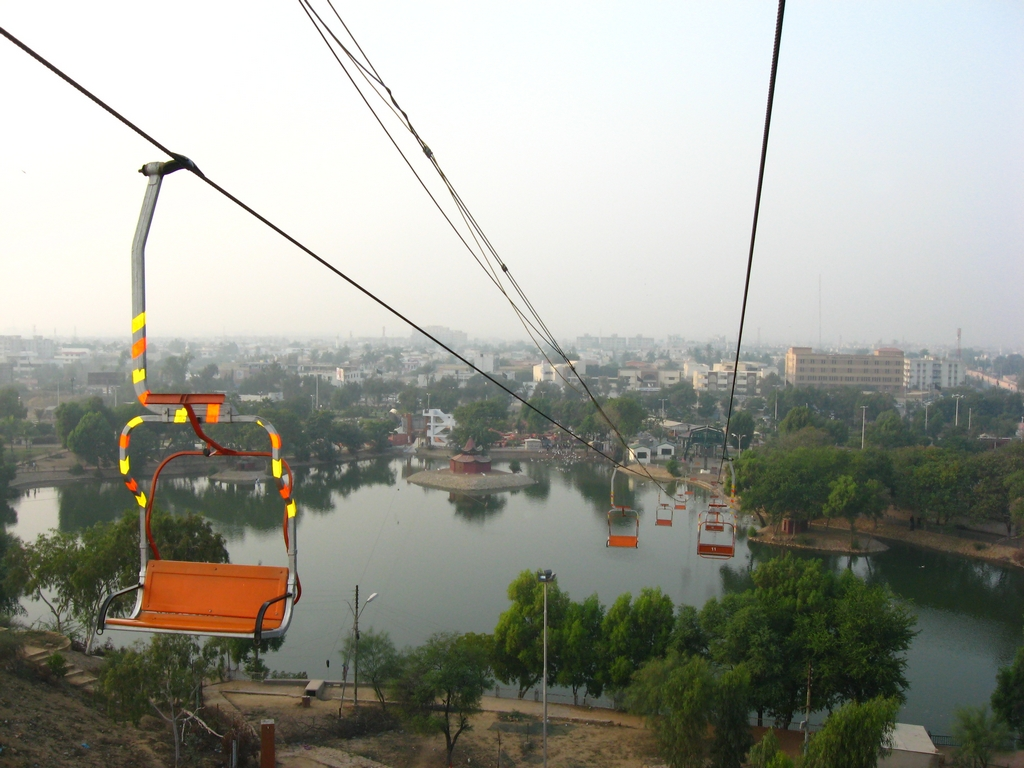
Safari Park as viewed from the chair lift

- Chairlift: A 10-minute-long chairlift ride was set up at a cost of US$ 2 million and was inaugurated by the Karachi City Nazim Syed Mustafa Kamal on March 8, 2006.

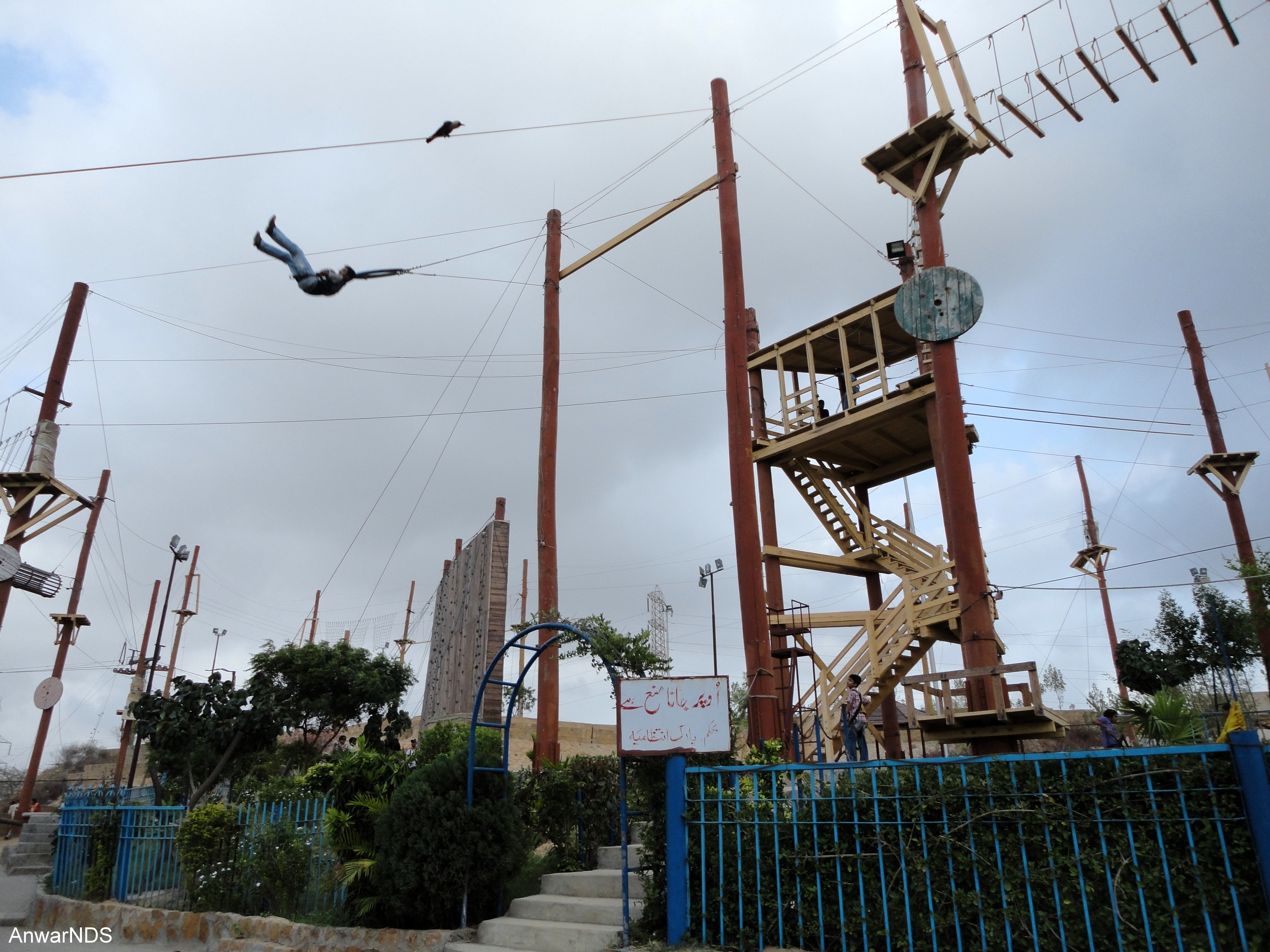
A view of Go Aish Adventure Park

- Go Aish: A private theme park featuring ropes course, paintball, quad biking, indoor climbing and a mini golf course.
- Elephant enclave: An enclave of about 65,000 square including a bathing space and resting area for the elephants has been constructed in the park for the joy of visitors and the elephants.
- Kashmir Point: Kashmir Point is one of the newly built picnic spots in Safari Park. It was inaugurated by the Mayor of Karachi, Mr. Wasim Akhter. The scenic view from this picnic spot resembles the valleys of Kashmir, which is a rare sight in Karachi.

=== Future projects ===
- Aviary: In June 2012, administrator of KMC, Muhammad Hussain Syed, told The Nation (Pakistani newspaper) that the country's biggest aviary was being constructed speedily inside the safari park.
- Boating: In September 2012, it was announced that pedalo boating would be introduced in the lake.
- Camping site: A 300 acres of scouting land and camping area was also reported to be under development in October 2012.
- Museum: A 3,000 yards expense will be used by Karachi Municipal Corporation to develop a unique museum for the endangered birds in Safari Park, in accordance with the International Standards. This move will help raise awareness about the ongoing extinction alert for rare bird species.

== See also ==
- Lahore Zoo Safari
- List of parks and gardens in Pakistan
- List of parks and gardens in Lahore
- List of parks and gardens in Karachi
