= Clifton Fish Aquarium =

- Interactive map of Clifton Fish Aquarium
- 24.812164°N 67.027172°E
- Date opened: 1965
- Date closed: 1998
- Location: Clifton, Karachi, Pakistan
- Annual visitors: 1 million

The Clifton Fish Aquarium was an aquarium located in Clifton, Karachi, Pakistan, near to Abdullah Shah Ghazi's shrine. It was in operation from 1965 to 1998. It was Karachi's largest public aquarium.

Several unsuccessful attempts were made to reopen the aquarium after it closed, including one in 2012.

== History ==
The now defunct Karachi Metropolitan Corporation (KMC) built the aquarium in Clifton in 1965 in collaboration with Japanese experts. The aquarium had 33 seawater exhibition tanks where sea-based fish were kept, and 14 fresh water tanks exhibiting fish species that live in fresh water. It was the only fish aquarium in the city, drew up to one million visitors per year, and was one of the largest revenue generators for the KMC.

The Clifton Fish Aquarium was closed in 1998 because of its "dilapidated" condition. Re-opening was announced for March and then October 2005, additional funds were allocated by the city in the 2007-2008 budget, the 2008-2009 budget, and again in the 2009-2010 budget, but the aquarium remains closed.
