= Lahore Zoo Safari =

Zoo in Pakistan

- سفری باغ وحش لاہور
- Interactive map of Lahore Zoo Safari
- Date opened: 1981
- Location: Lahore, Pakistan
- Land area: 98 ha
- Website: https://safarizoolahore.pk/

Lahore Zoo Safari Park is a zoo in Lahore, Pakistan.

== History ==
The Woodland Wildlife Park was established in 1981 over 98 hectares (242 acres) as a government funded public facility. In 1998, it was handed over to the Punjab Wildlife and Parks Department (PWPD) by the Forest Department. In 2004, the largest walkthrough aviary of Pakistan was constructed in Woodland Wildlife Park and opened to public visitors. Boating and fishing facilities were also built near a lake. In 2006, Government of Pakistan sanctioned 87 million Pakistani rupees to reconstruct the 2 kilometres (1.2 mi) road leading to the wildlife park. This development increased the accessibility to the facility.

The Government of Pakistan turned management of the wildlife park over to the Zoo Maintenance Committee (ZMC) headed by the Chairman of the PW PD. Vice-chairman Taqeer Shah said this transfer of control was due to poor previous management that was not working to improve the park. A ticket system was introduced in the wildlife park so that the Lahore Zoo Safari could become a semi-autonomous, self-financed organization. The park was extensively renovated and renamed Lahore Zoo Safari on January 21, 2009. The wildlife park is now considered to be an extension of Lahore Zoo.

== Attractions ==
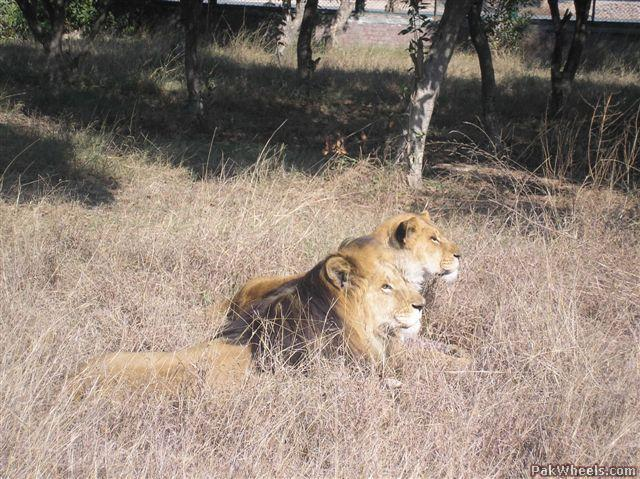
A pair of lions at Lahore Zoo Safari

The species housed here include African lion, Indian peafowl, Bengal tiger, common pheasant, emu, mute swan, nilgai, ostrich and silver pheasant among a few others. The largest walkthrough aviary of Pakistan is located in the Lahore Zoo Safari. Boating and fishing facilities have been developed near a lake. The lake is the biggest in the city, complete with four islands. There are also safari tracks in the lion and Bengal tiger areas, covering an area of 32 hectares (80 acres). It has been recently renamed as Lahore Safari Zoo.

== Controversies ==
In October 2006, a female Bengal tiger killed another female while in January 2007, a male killed another male. In June 2008, a Bengal tiger attacked a guard within the park. The jugular vein of the victim was ruptured causing blood loss and unconsciousness. The guard was taken to Jinnah Hospital for surgery. The aggressive nature of these animals have been brought to question. Officials stated that it was the first time that had happened and also admitted that the lower staff was being irresponsible about their duties.

On 26 April 2016, it was reported that the government spent around Rs 130.8 million in the purchasing of wild animals. White lions were purchased at a staggering cost of Rs 65.5 million whereas their market rate cost is around Rs 5.6-5.9 million.

3 Bengal Tigers were bought for Rs 10,830,000.

On 27 February 2020, an 18 year old boy's remains were found in the zoo's lion enclosure. His skull and two bones were found inside the enclosure which had 4 lions inside.

== Reclaiming the Wilderness ==
"Reclaiming the Wilderness" is an initiative to design cage-less zoo according to international standards to conserve and preserve wildlife by providing educational and recreational platform.

== See also ==
- List of parks and gardens in Lahore
- List of parks and gardens in Pakistan
- List of parks and gardens in Karachi
- Karachi Safari Park
