= List of tourist attractions in Karachi =

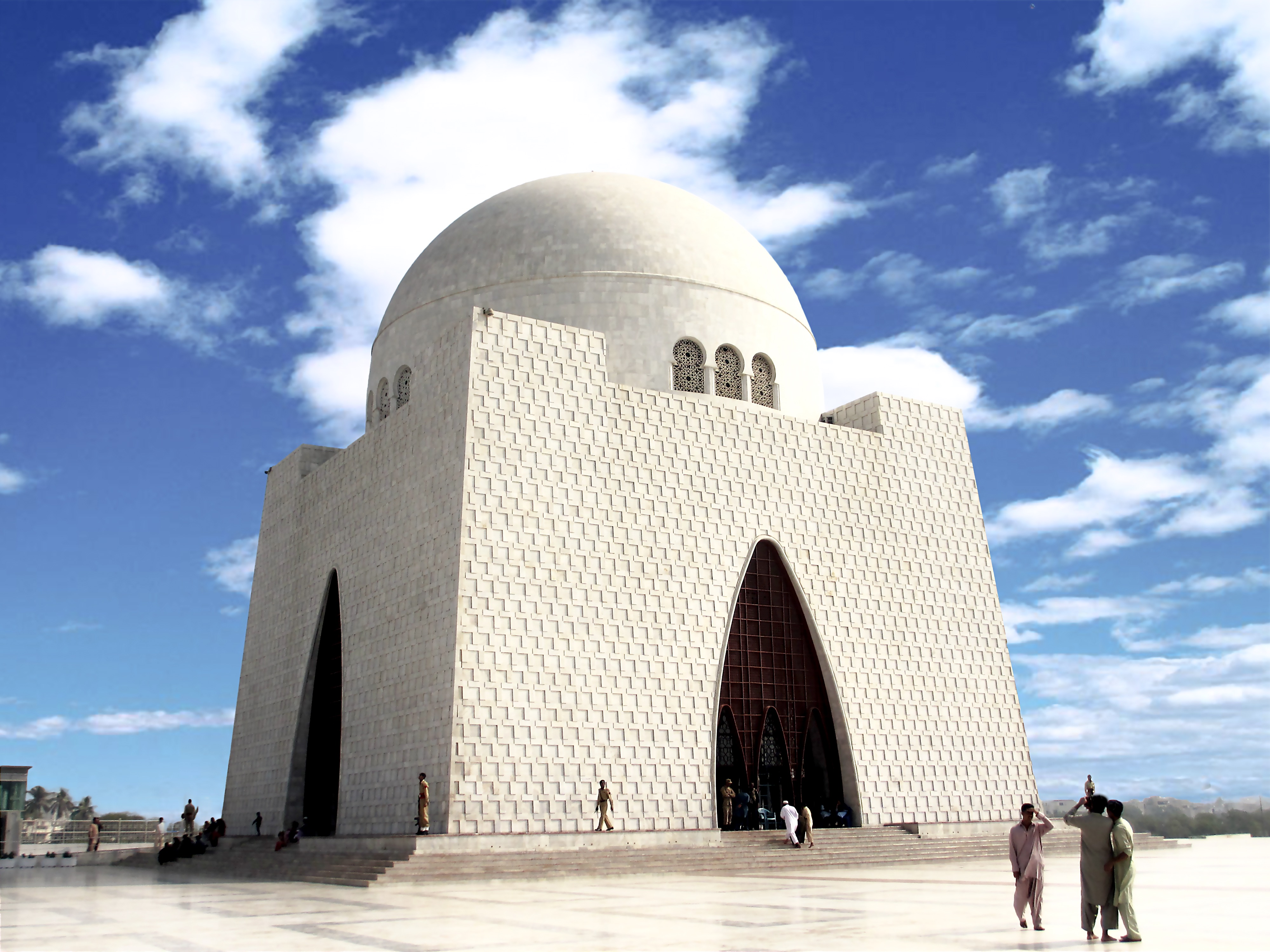
Mazar-e-Quaid, also known as the Mausoleum of Muhammad Ali Jinnah.

Karachi is a tourist destination for domestic and international tourists. This is a list of tourist attractions in the city of Karachi, Sindh, Pakistan.

== Museums ==
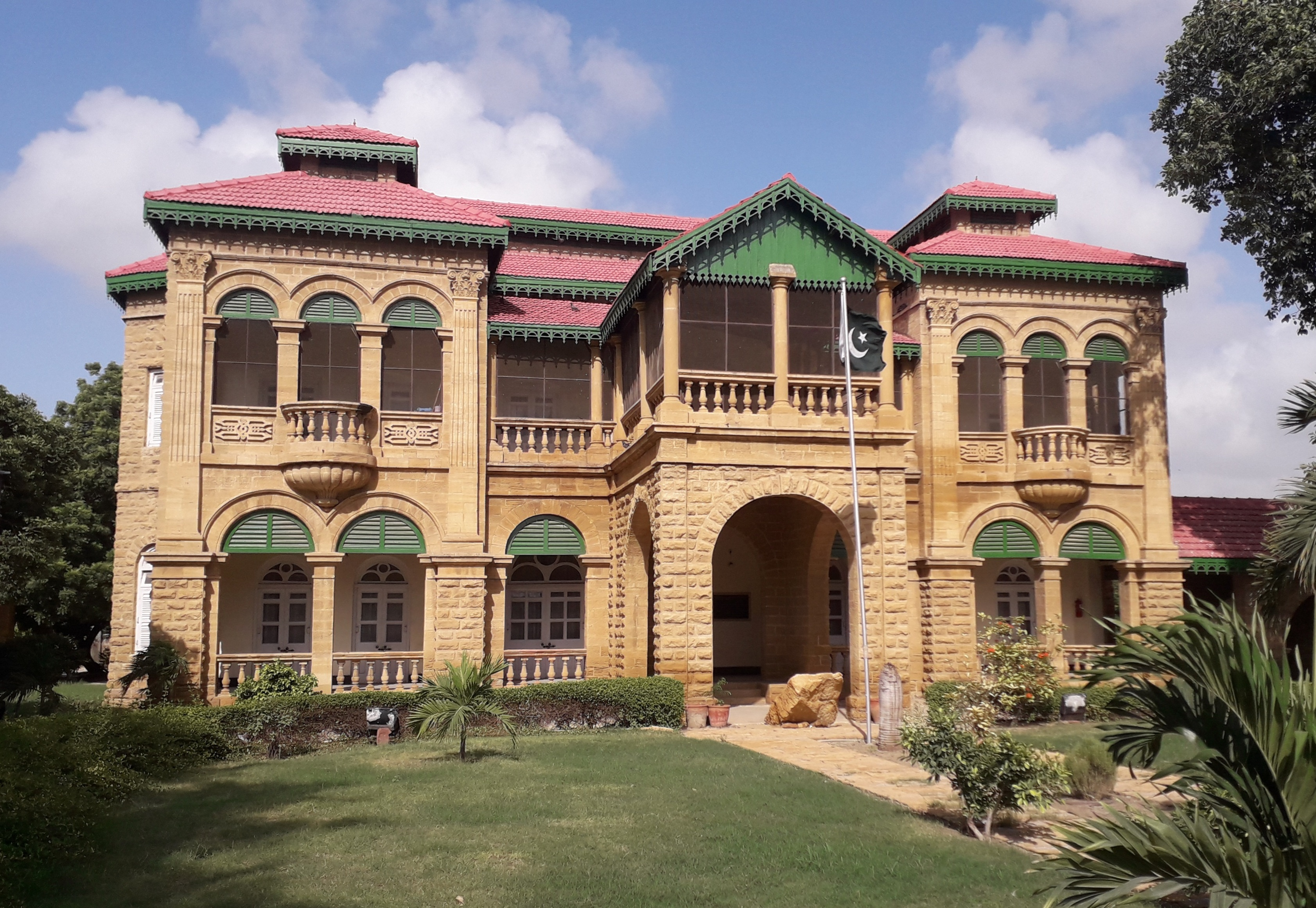
Quaid-e-Azam House.

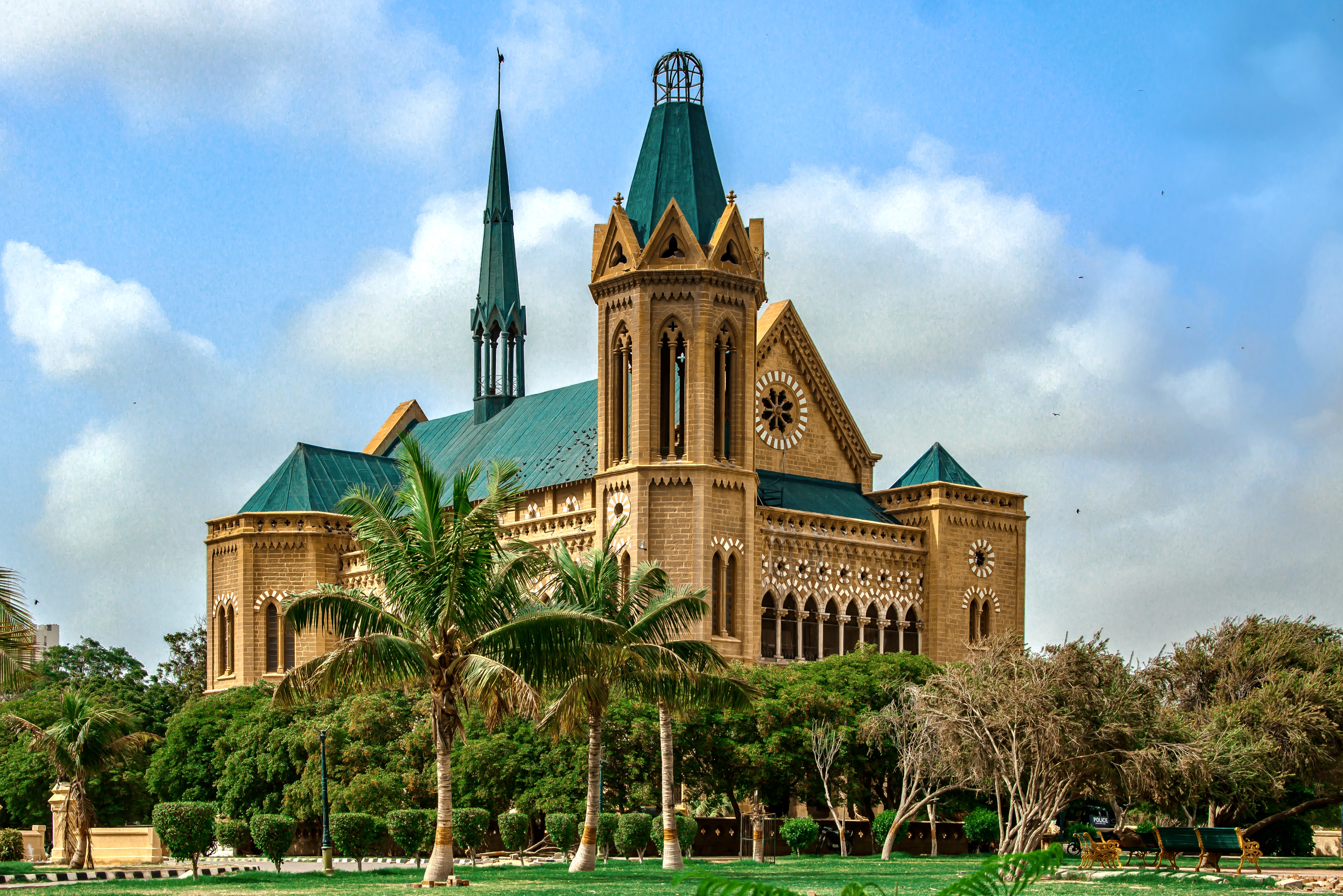
Frere Hall, Karachi

- Frere Hall
- MagnifiScience Centre
- National Museum of Pakistan
- Pakistan Air Force Museum
- Pakistan Maritime Museum
- Quaid-e-Azam House, also known as Flagstaff House, a museum dedicated to the life of Muhammad Ali Jinnah
- Wazir Mansion, also as Quaid-i-Azam Birthplace Museum, a museum that was the birthplace of Muhammad Ali Jinnah
- Mazar-e-Quaid Museum, present inside the Quaid-i-Azam mausoleum
- TDF Ghar
- Mohatta Palace
- PIA Planetarium
- Sindh Wildlife Museum

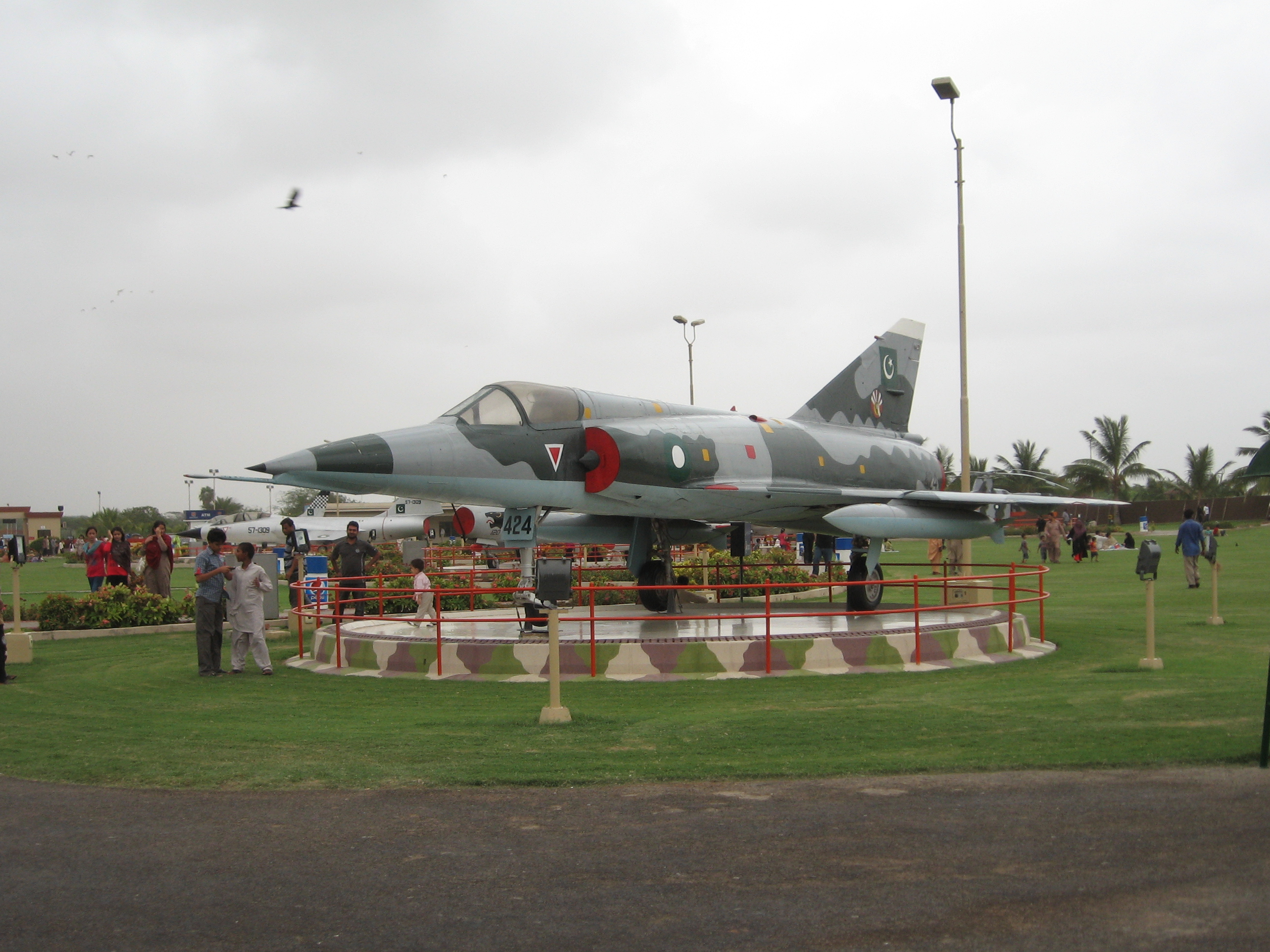
Pakistan Air Force Museum, Karachi

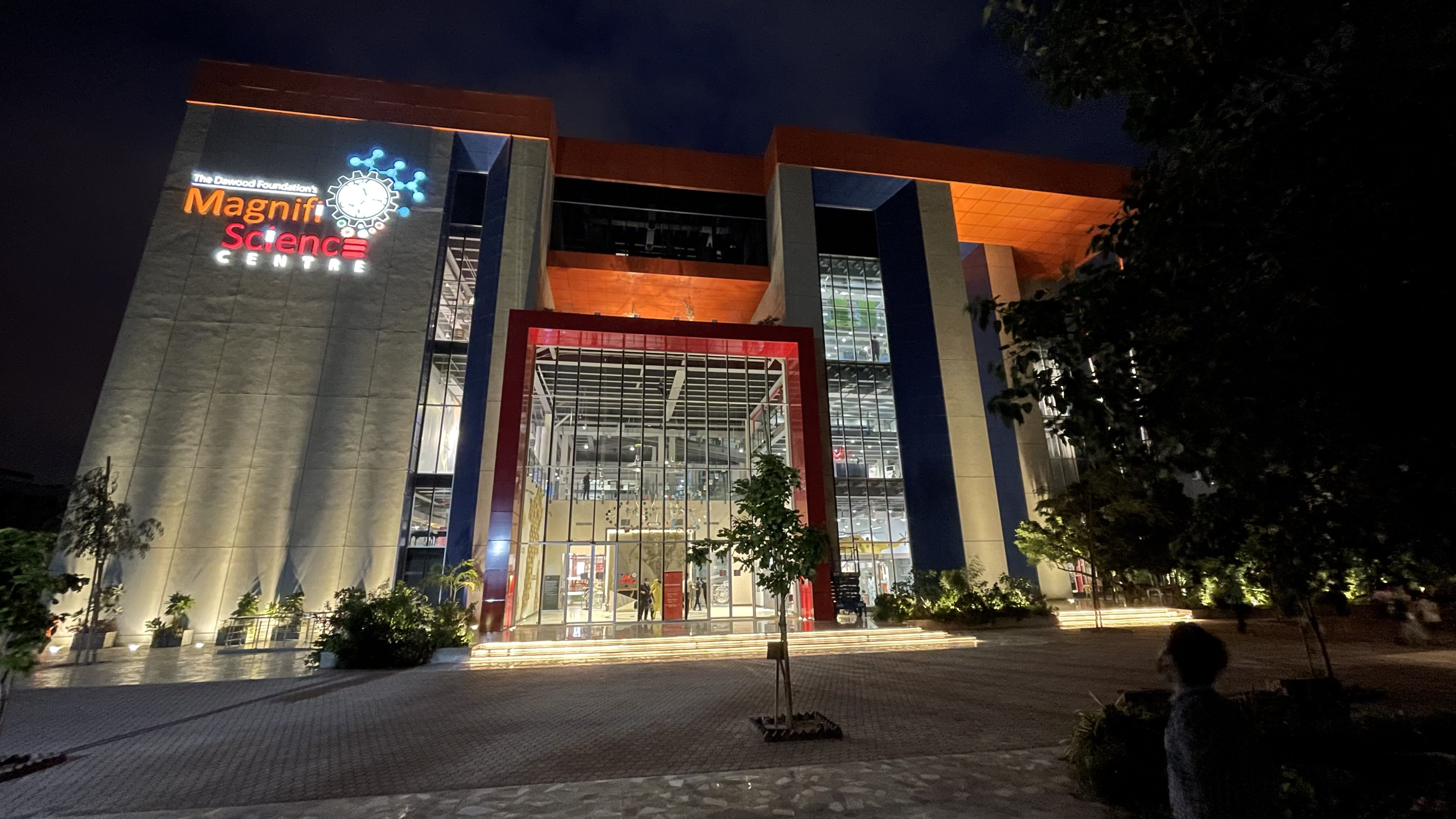
MagnifiScience Centre, Karachi

== Monuments, mosques, temples, landmarks, and memorials ==
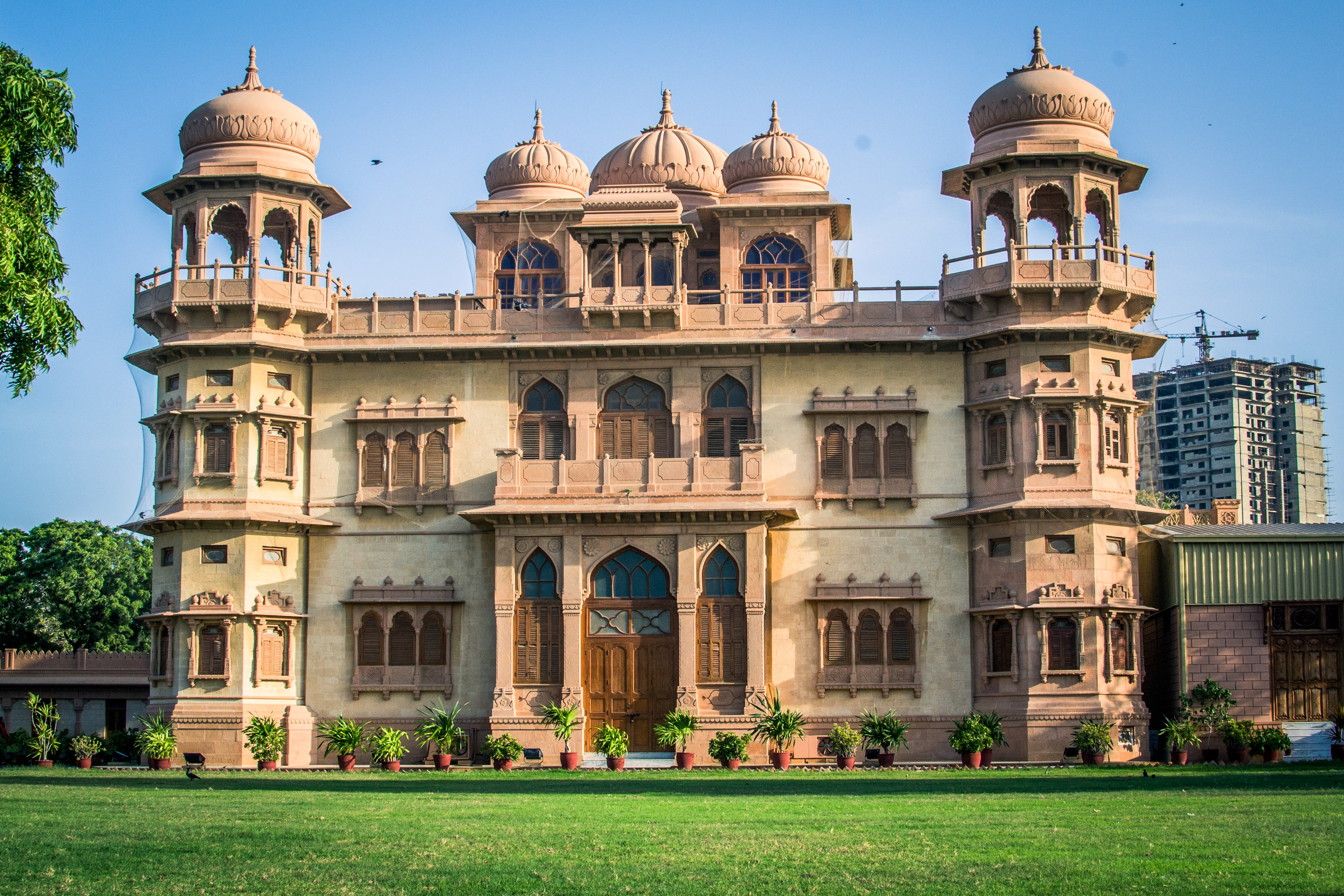
Mohatta Palace.

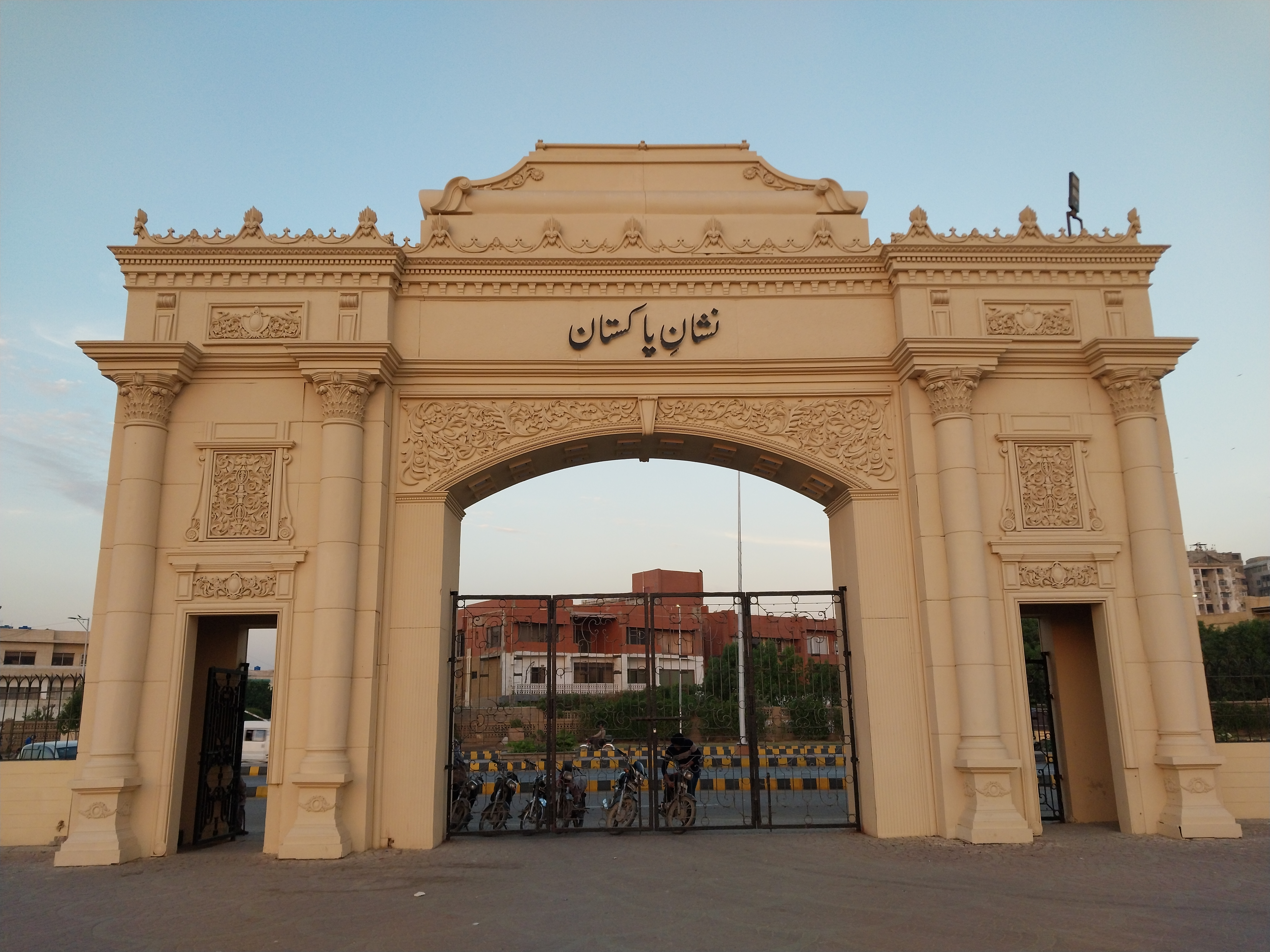
Nishan-e-Pakistan Monument

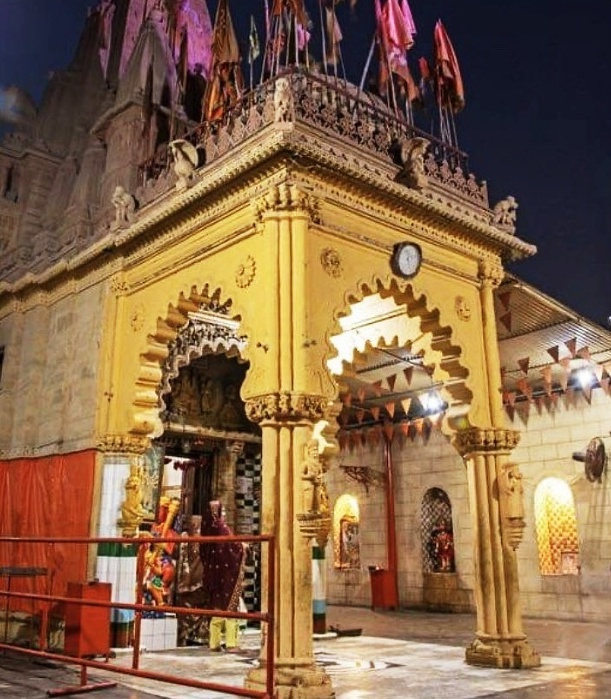
Panchmukhi Hanuman Temple

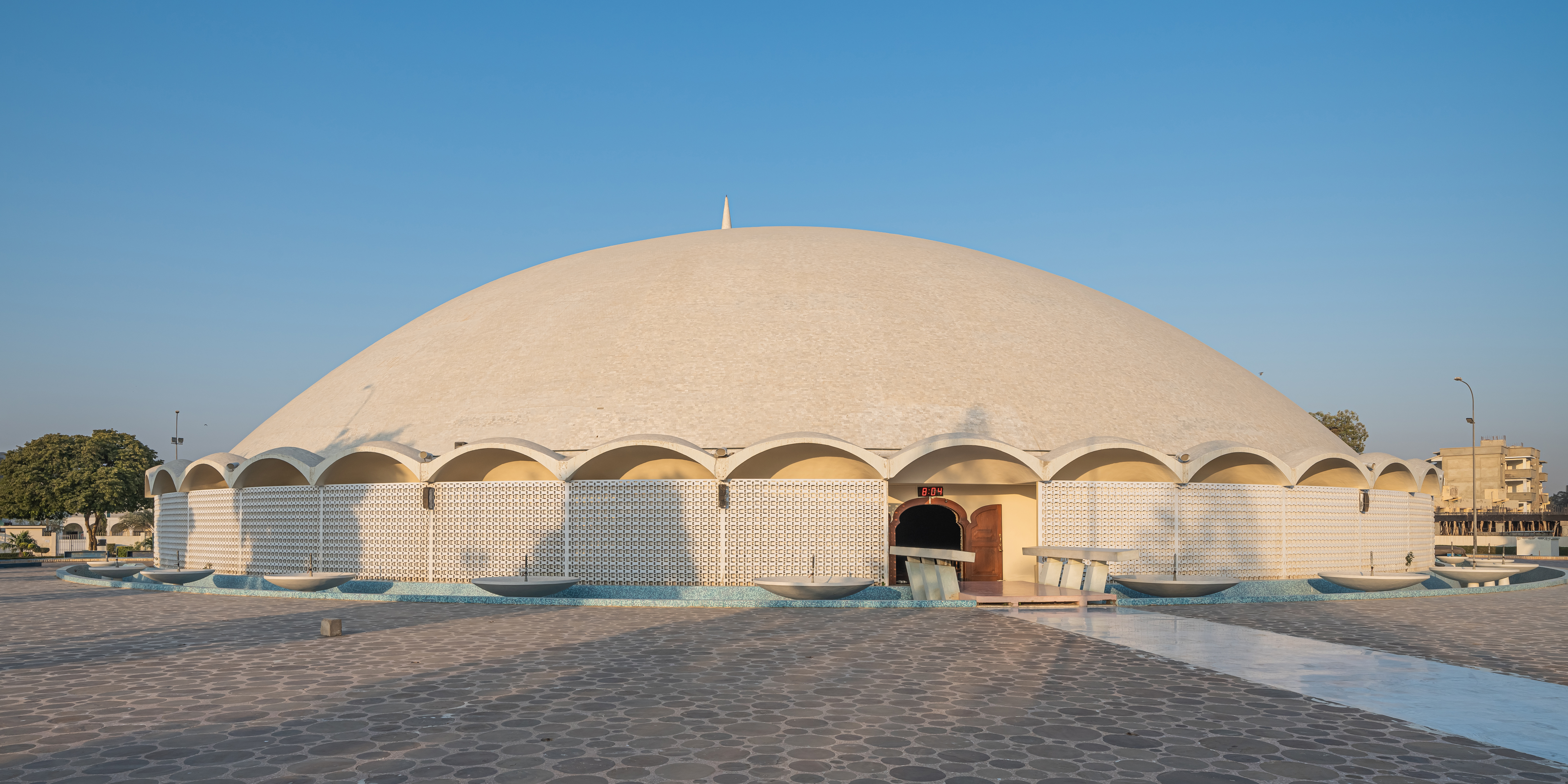
Masjid-e-Tooba, Karachi

- Hindu Gymkhana
- Jehangir Kothari Parade
- Grand Jamia Mosque
- Masjid-e-Tooba
- Mazare-e-Quaid Tomb
- Pakistan Chowk
- Abdullah Shah Ghazi Shrine
- Manghopir Shrine and Manghopir Lake
- Shree Ratneshwar Mahadev Temple
- Merewether Memorial Tower
- Liaquat Memorial Library
- Mohatta Palace
- Panchmukhi Hanuman Temple
- Monument to Christ the King
- New Memon Masjid
- Aram Bagh Mosque
- Teen Talwar
- Eiffel Tower Bahria Town
- State Bank of Pakistan Museum & Art Gallery
- Chaukandi tombs
- Nishan-e-Pakistan
- Masjid e Khizra Gulistan e Johar
- Masjid e Safina
- Do Talwar
- Chaar Minar Chowrangi
- Bahria Dancing Fountains

== Historic and other notable buildings ==
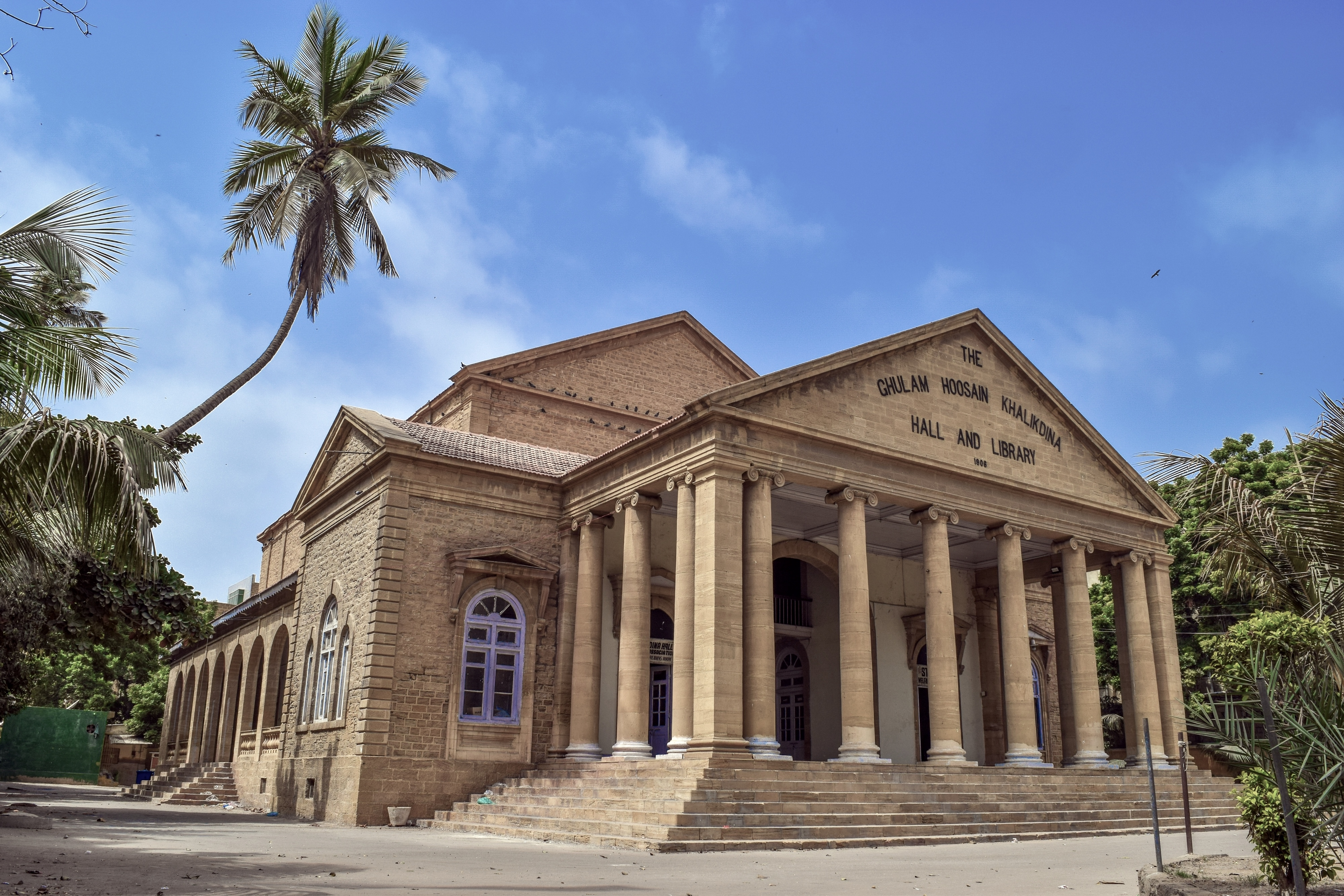
Khaliq Dina Hall.

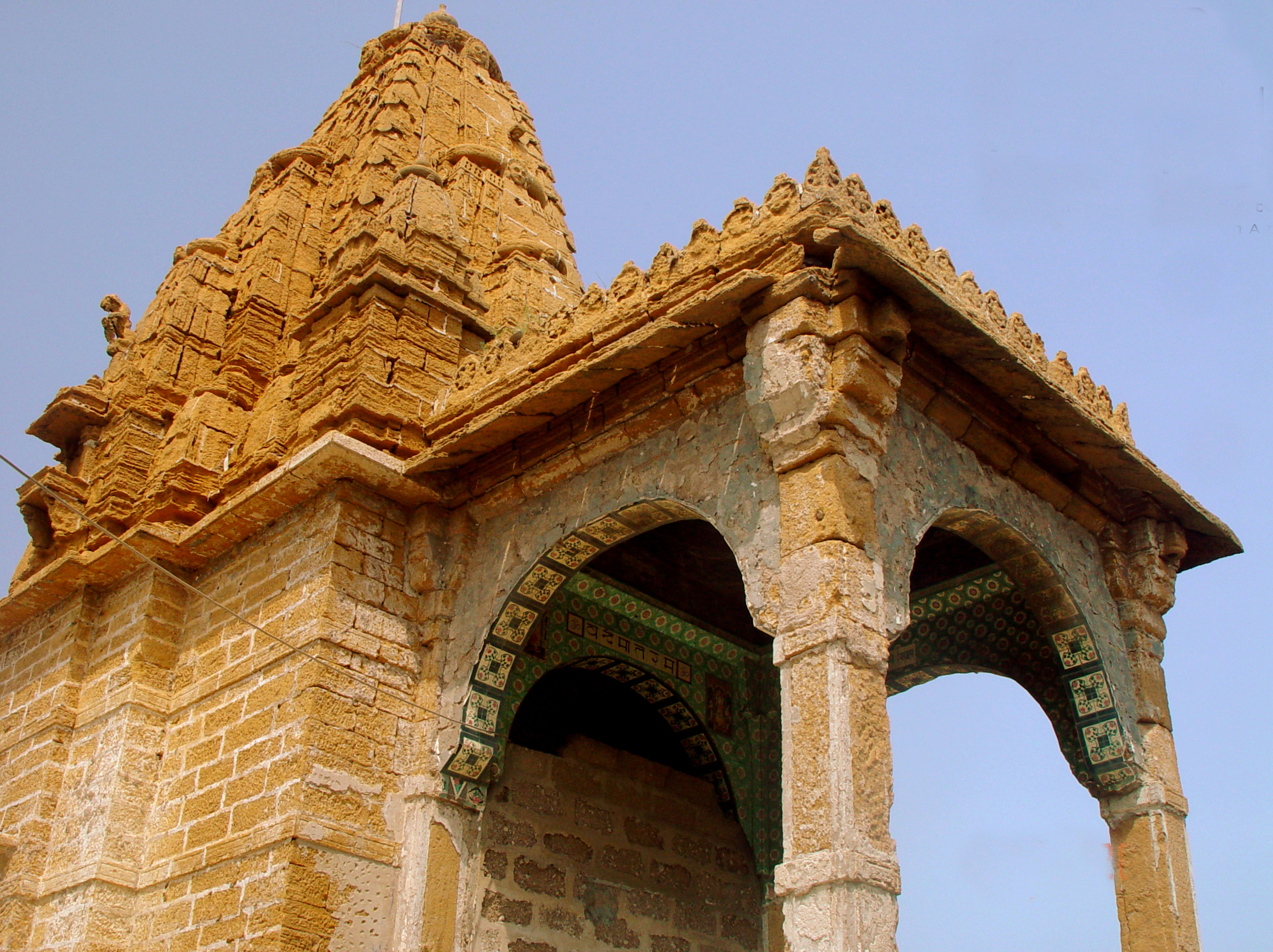
Shri Varun Dev Mandir.

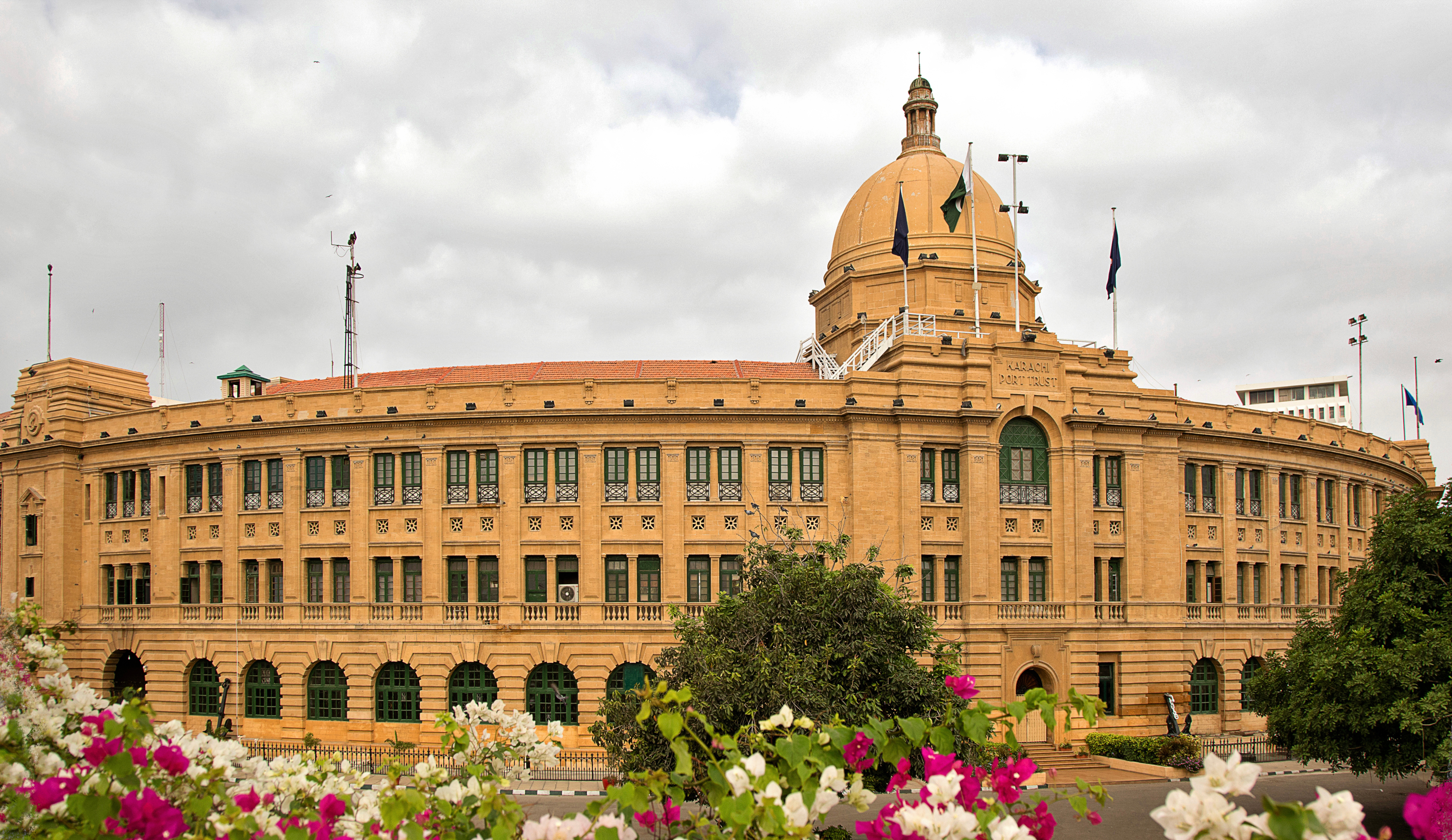
Karachi Port Trust (KPT) Head Office Building

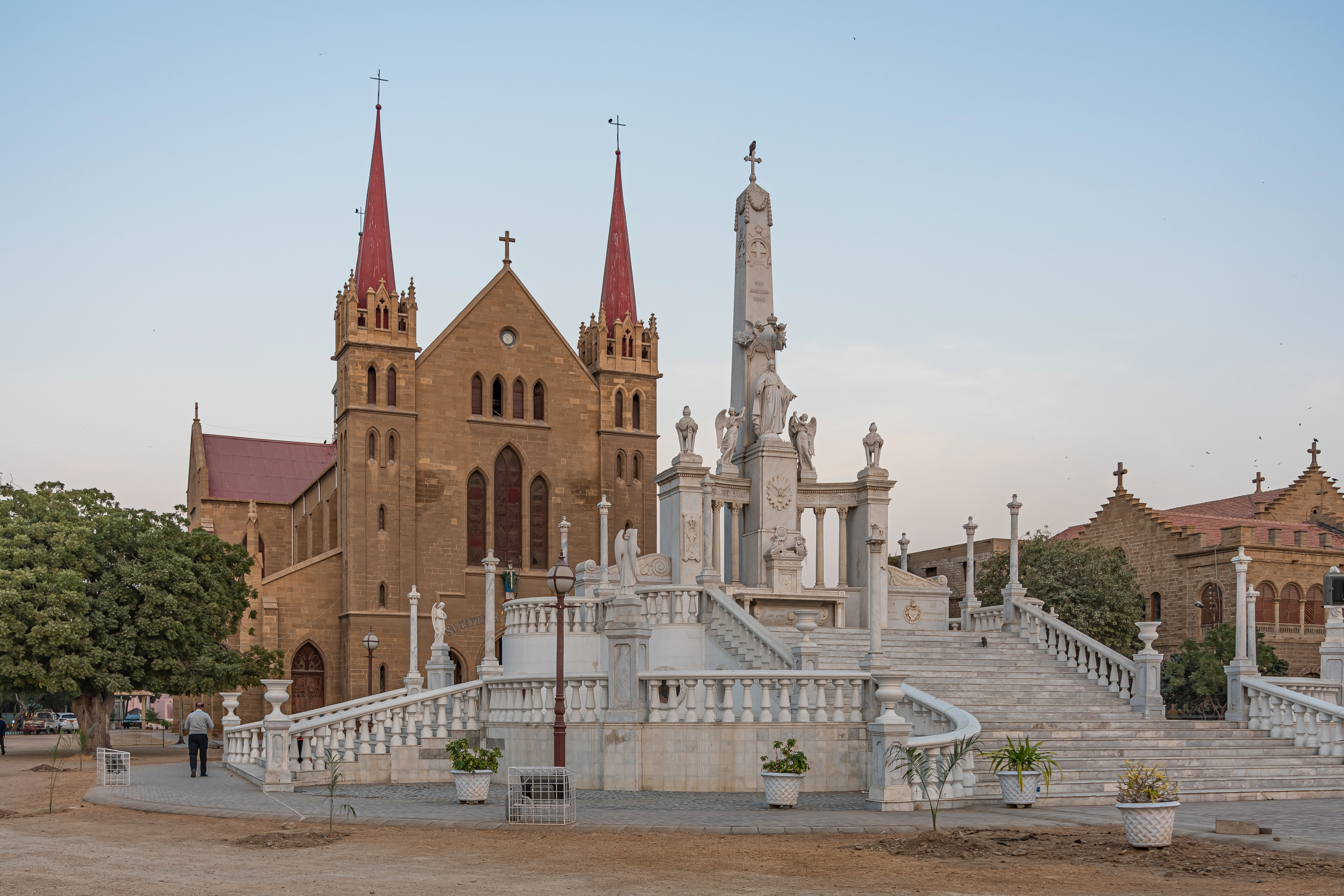
Saint Patrick's Cathedral, Karachi and Monument to Christ the King

- Abdullah Shah Ghazi Shrine
- Bahria Icon Tower
- Denso Hall
- DJ Science College
- Dolmen City, Clifton
- Governor House
- Hindu Gymkhana
- Edward House
- Karachi Cantonment railway station
- Khaliq Dina Hall
- Habib Bank Plaza
- MCB Tower
- Holy Trinity Cathedral
- Jehangir Kothari Parade, Clifton
- Karachi Municipal Corporation Building
- Karachi Port Trust Building
- TDF Ghar
- Mohatta Palace
- Qasim Fort, Manora
- Mules Mansion
- Hassan Ali Hoti Market
- Saint Patrick's Cathedral, Karachi
- Shri Panchmukhi Hanuman Mandir
- Shri Swaminarayan Mandir, Karachi
- Shri Varun Dev Mandir
- Sindh Assembly building
- Manora Point Lighthouse
- Cape Monze Lighthouse

== Markets and Ports ==
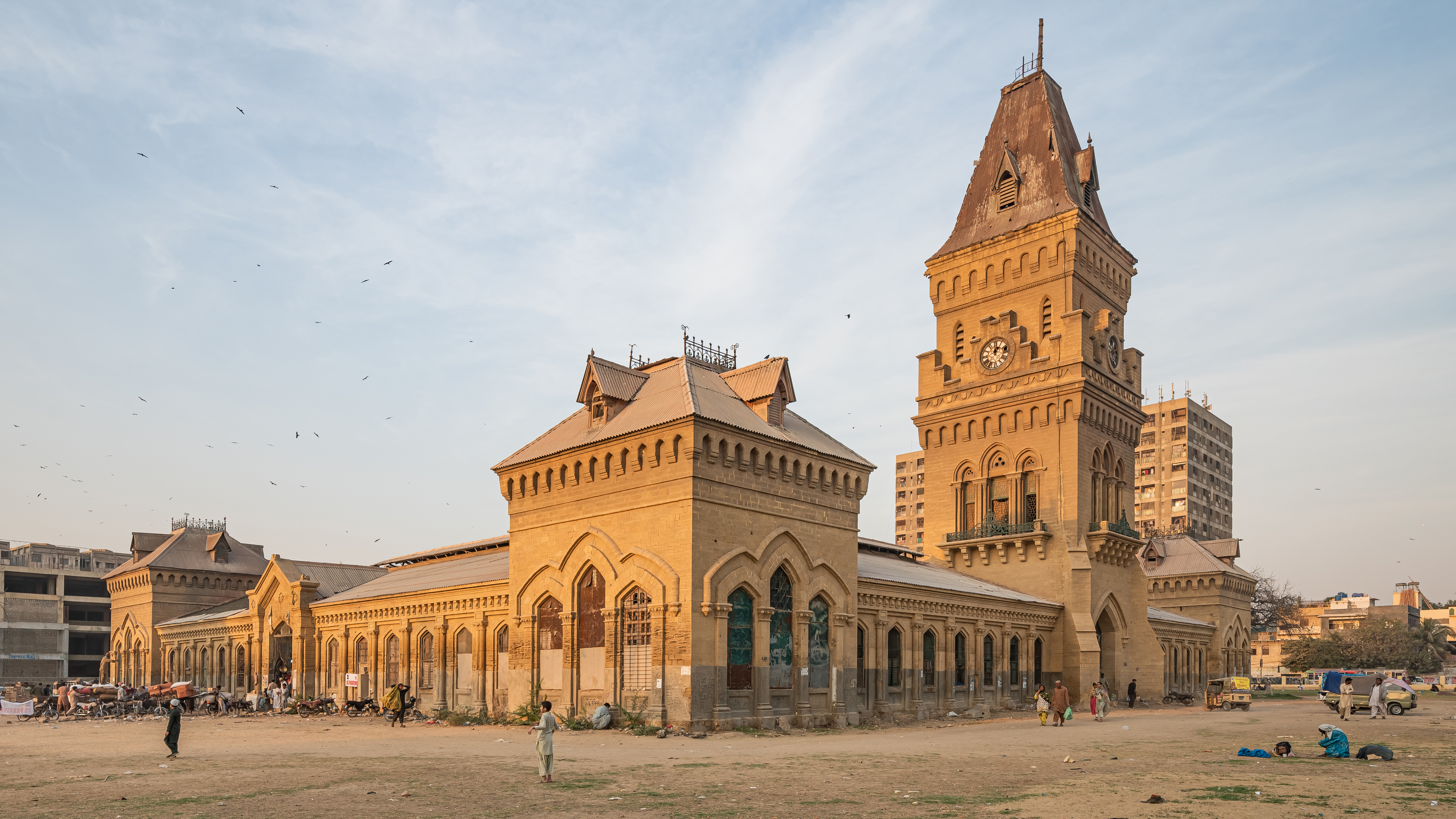
Empress Market.

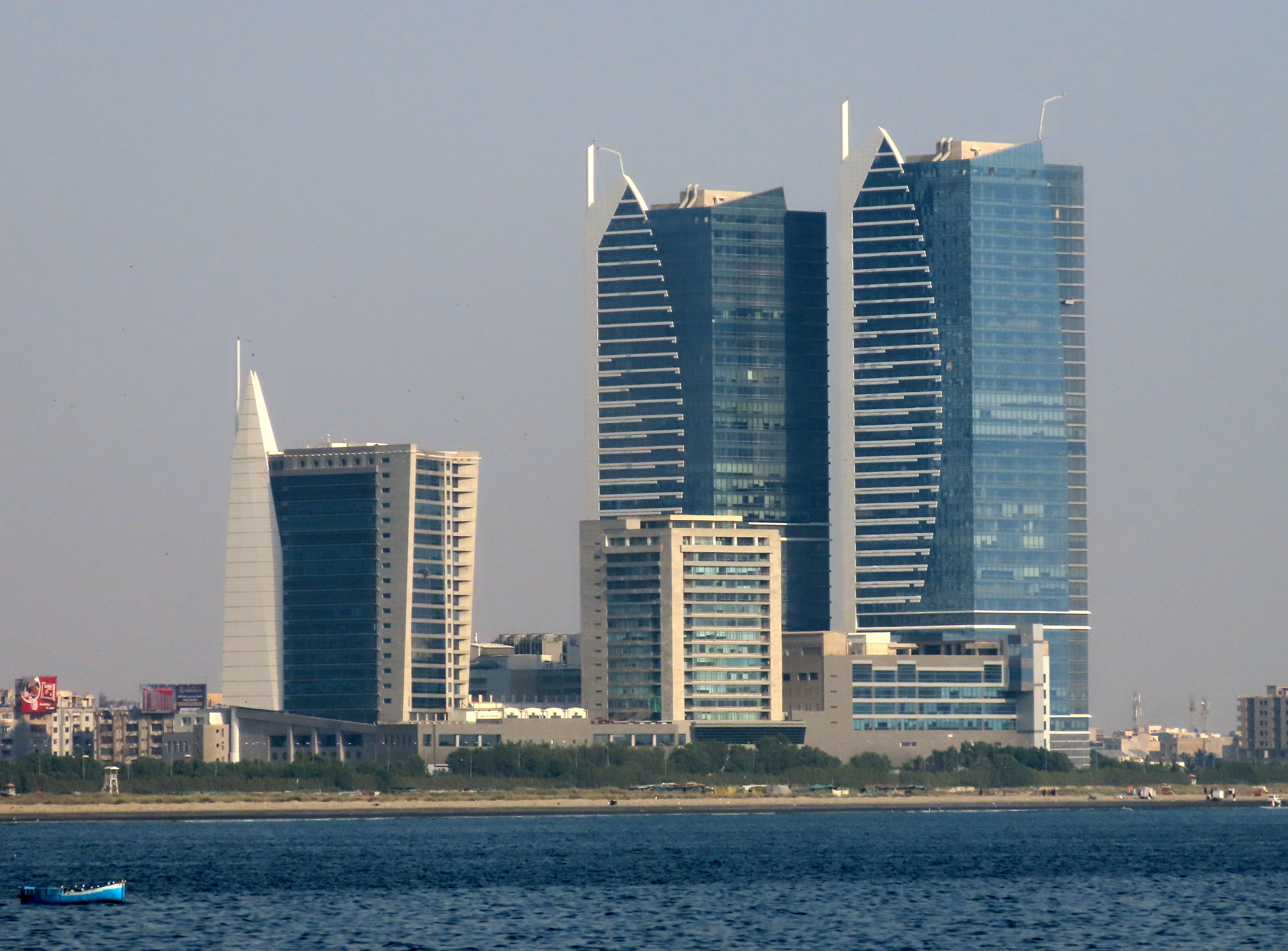
Dolmen Towers, A Mall in Karachi

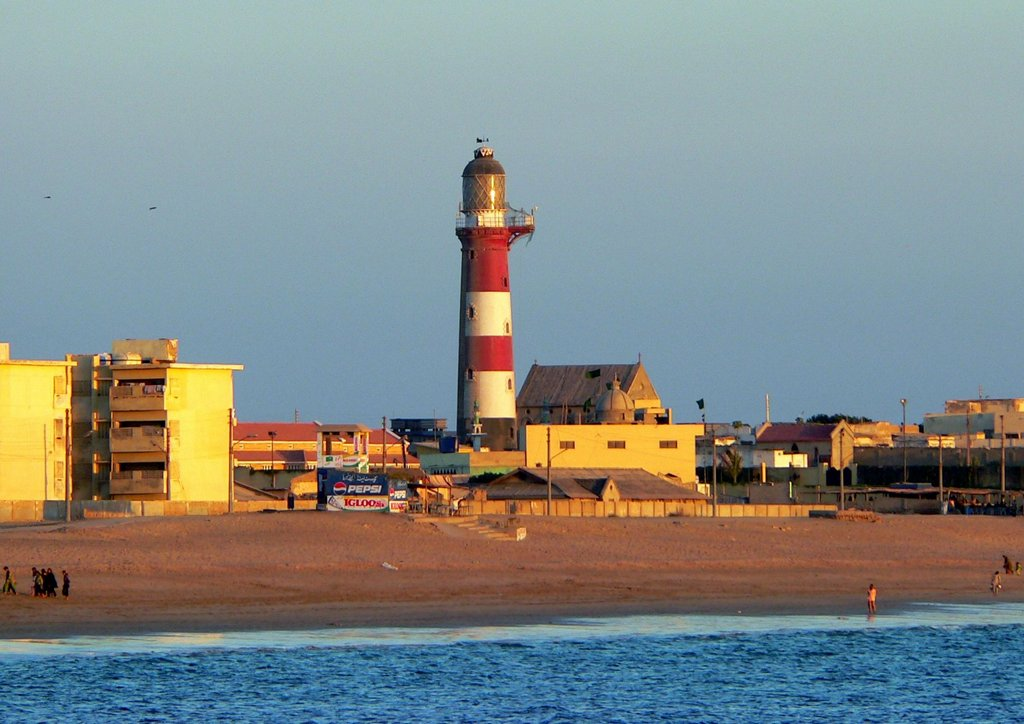
Manora Lighthouse

=== Malls ===
- Lucky One Mall
- Dolmen Malls
- Ocean Mall and Tower
- Millennium Mall
- Atrium Mall
- Park Towers
- The Forum
- Northwalk
- Saima Mall
- Saima Paari Mall
- Saima Jinnah Icon Mall
- Square One
- Gull Tijarah
- Emerald Tower
- Mega Mall
- Central Plaza Shopping Mall

=== Historical, Traditional, and Contemporary Markets ===
- Empress Market
- Zainab Market
- Tariq Road
- Bahadurabad
- Boulton Market
- Bohri Bazaar
- Meena Bazaar
- Urdu Bazaar
- Zaibunnisa Street
- Zamzama Commercial
- Jodia Bazaar
- Khori Garden
- Lea Market
- Jama Cloth Market
- Gulf Market
- Hyderi
- Cooperative Market, Saddar
- Lalukhet
- Peetal Gali

=== Ports and Adjacent Areas ===
- Port Trust Building
- Port Qasim
- Karachi Port
- M.A. Jinnah Road
- Port Grand

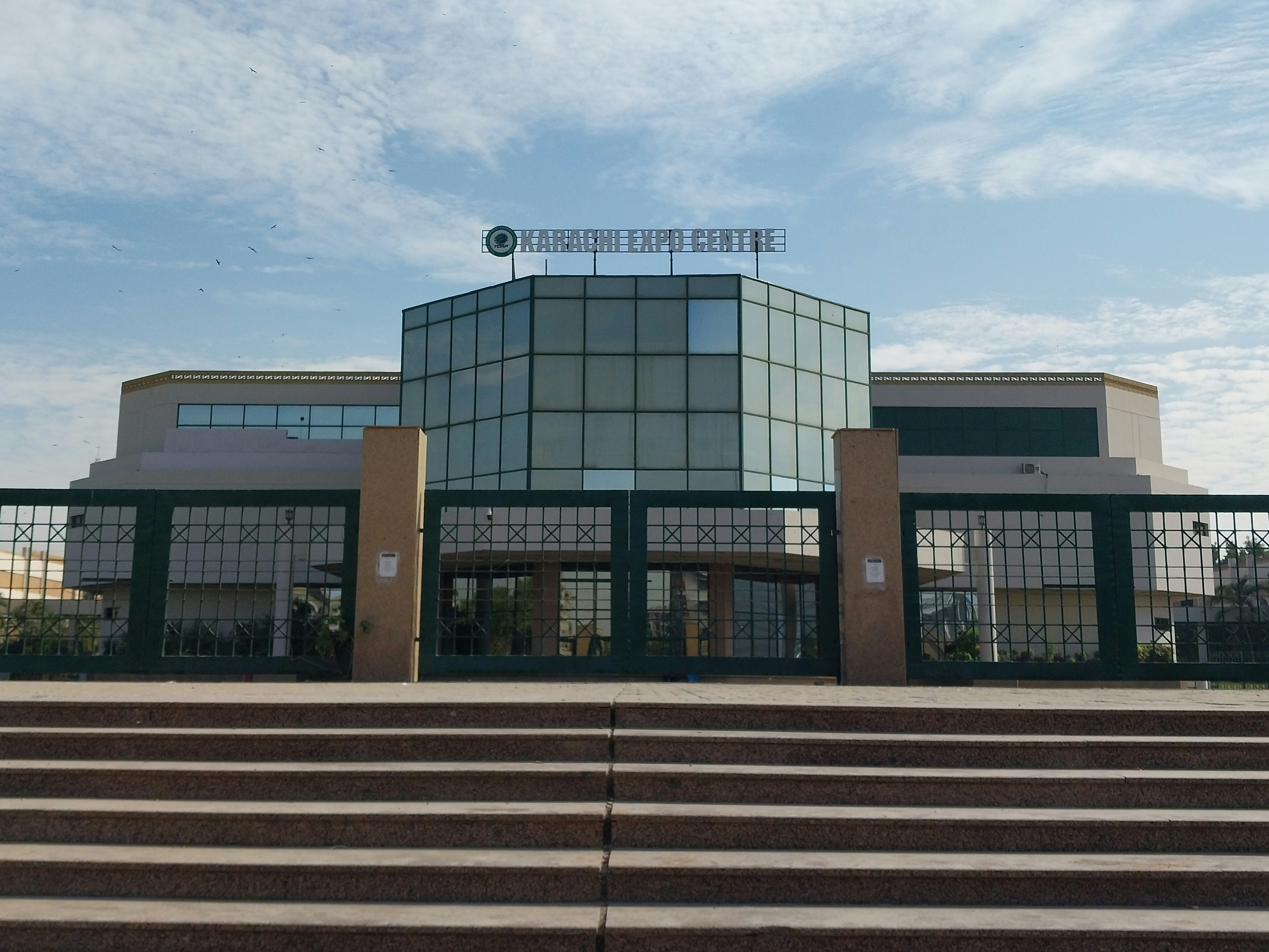
Karachi Expo Center

=== Events and Exhibitions ===
- Karachi Expo Center
- Arts Council of Pakistan
- Al-Kawthar University Auditorium, Karachi

== Beaches and Waterfronts ==
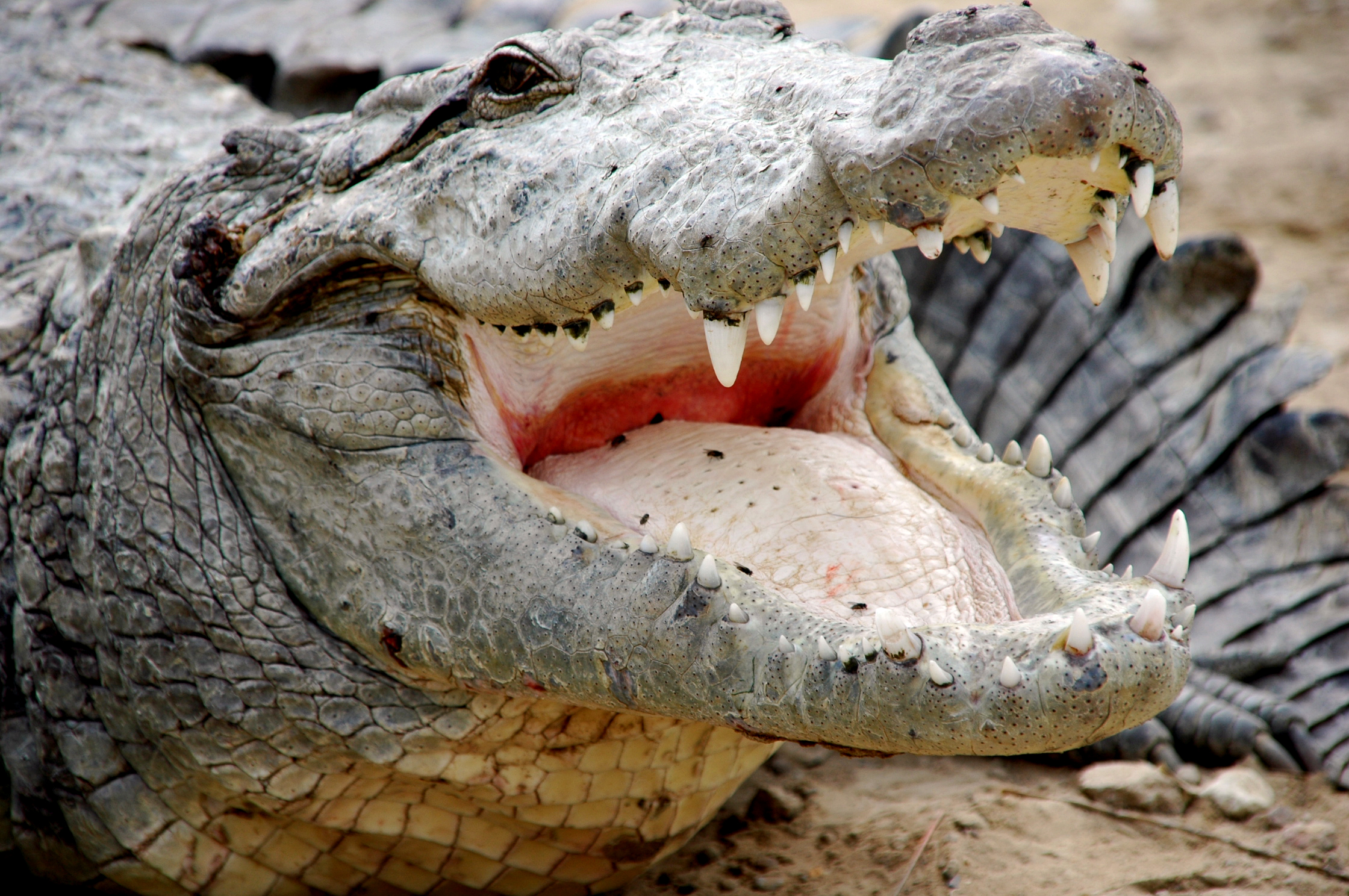
A Crocodile in Manghopir Lake near Manghopir Shrine

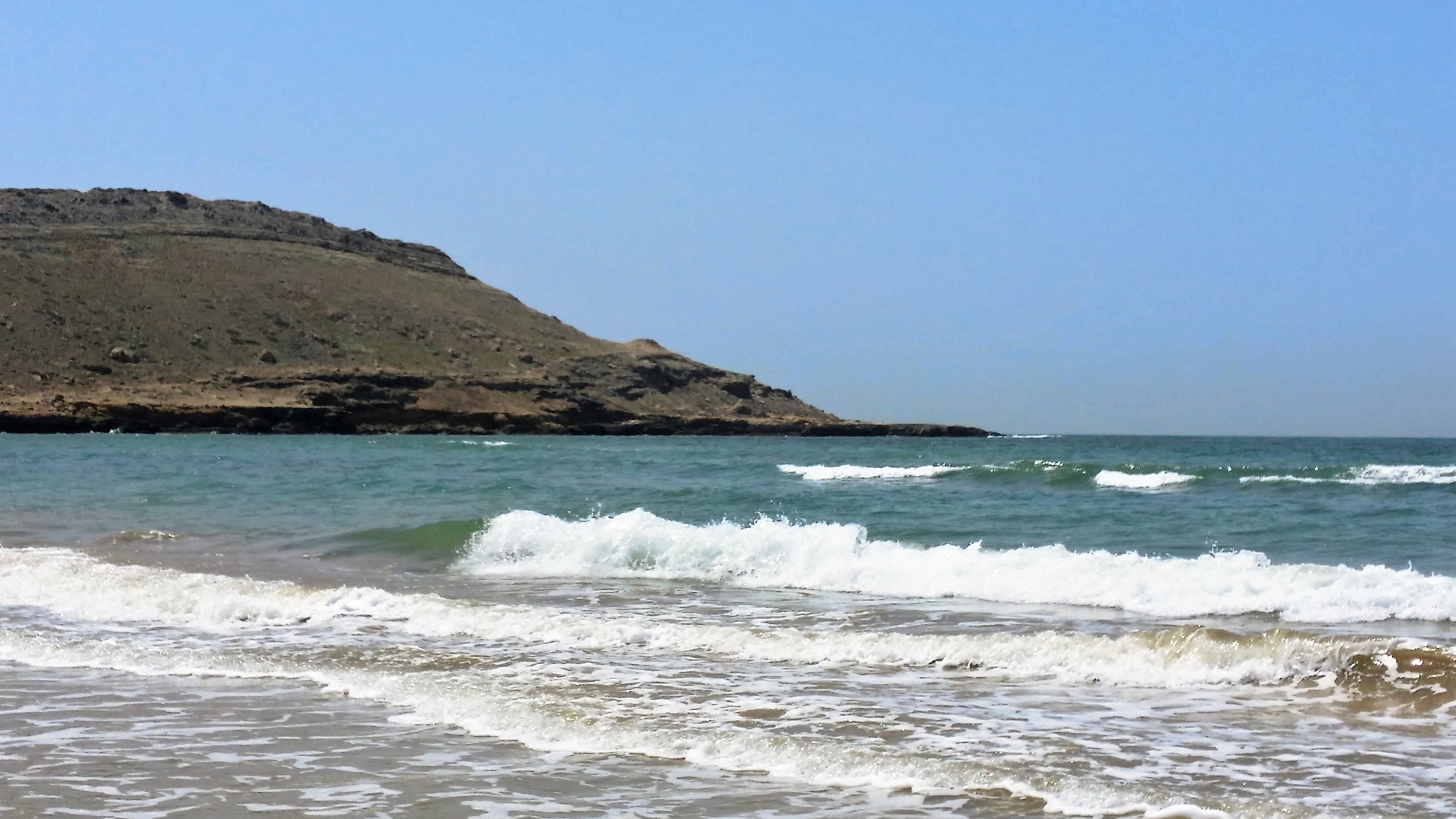
Mubarak Village Beach

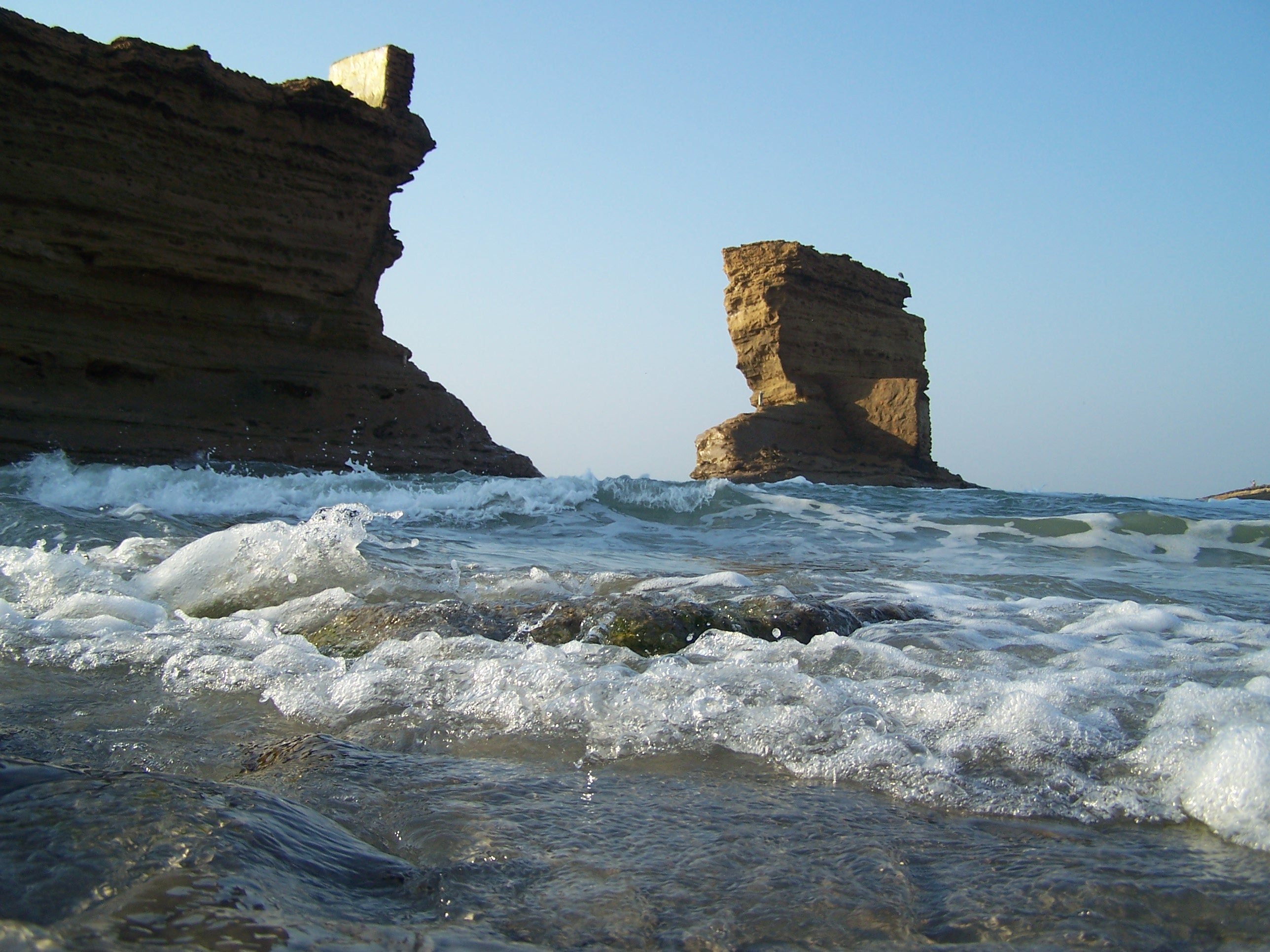
Paradise Point, Karachi

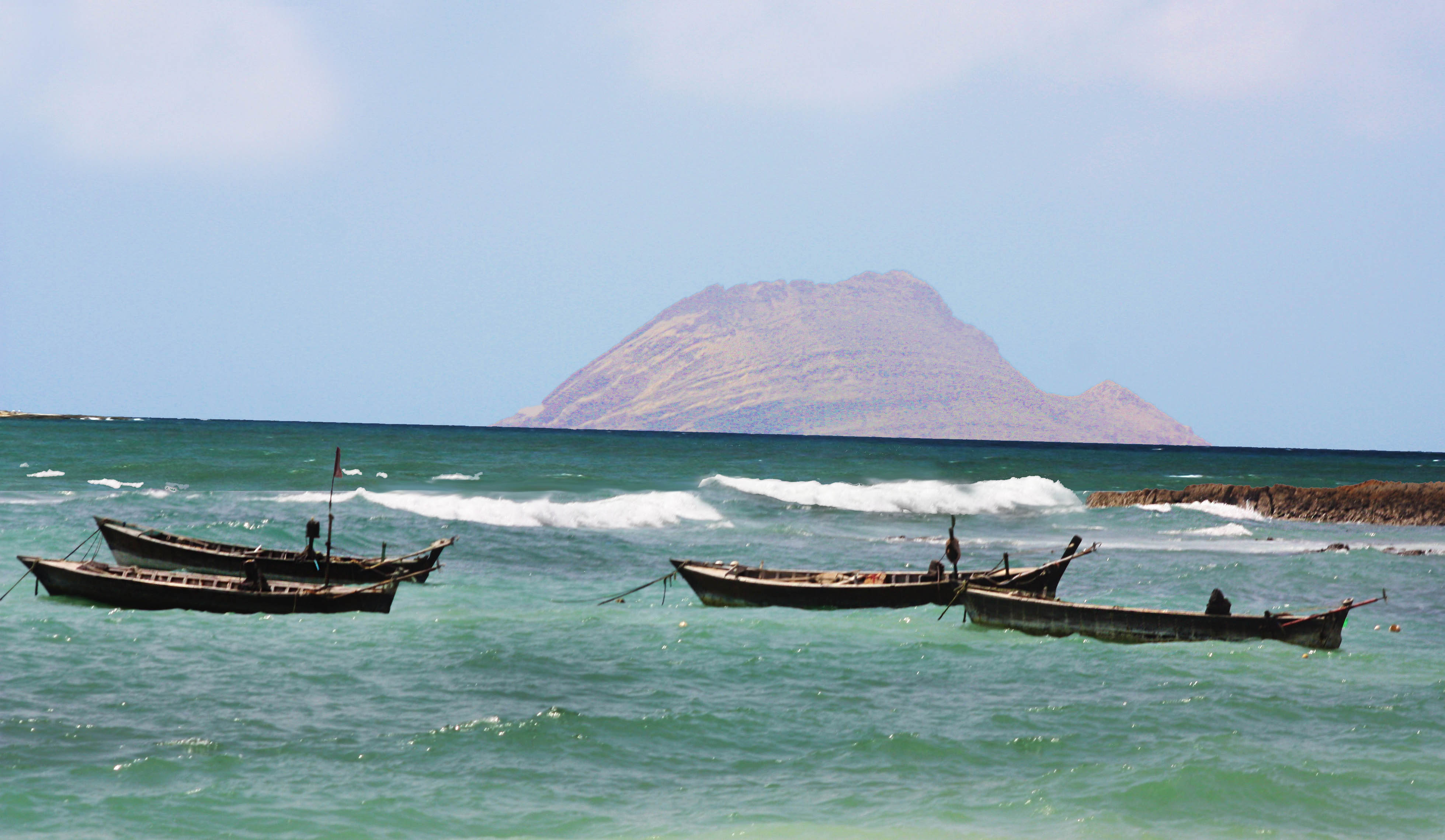
Boats in the sea near Mubarak Village, overlooking Churna Island.

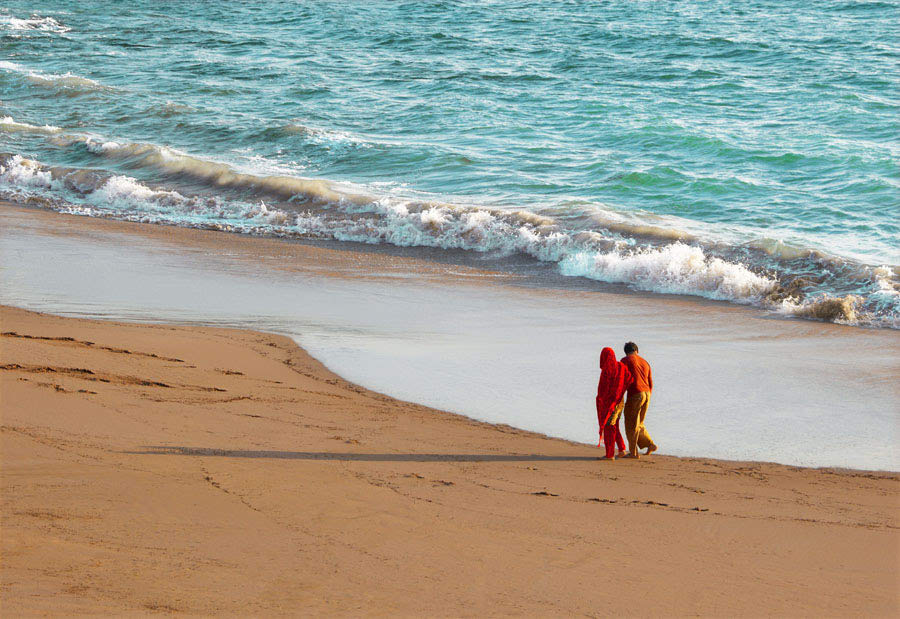
French Beach Karachi

- Cape Mount
- Clifton Beach
- French Beach
- Hawke's Bay
- Paradise Point
- Sandspit Beach
- Russian beach
- Mubarak Village
- Turtle Beach
- Seaview Beach
- Manora Beach
- Sunehri Beach
- Manjhar Goth
- Bhit Khohri Beach
- Tushan Beach
- Nathiagali Beach
- Do Darya
- Devils Point
- China Port
- Oyster Rocks
- China Creek
- Korangi Creek
- Mangrove Biodiversity Park, Korangi Creek
- Thaddo Dam
- Pachran Waterfall

== Beach Resorts ==
- The Cove - Beach Resort & Club
- Destination Beach Resort

=== Nearby Beach Resorts ===
- Khoj Allana Resort
- GreenPak Lagoon Gadani
- GreenPak Broadbeach Sonmiani
- Gold Coast Beach Resort
- Haft Talar Beach Resort, Kund Malir
- Haft Talar Beach Resort, Ormara
- Bolan Safari Resort
- Gidan Beach Resort

== Parks ==
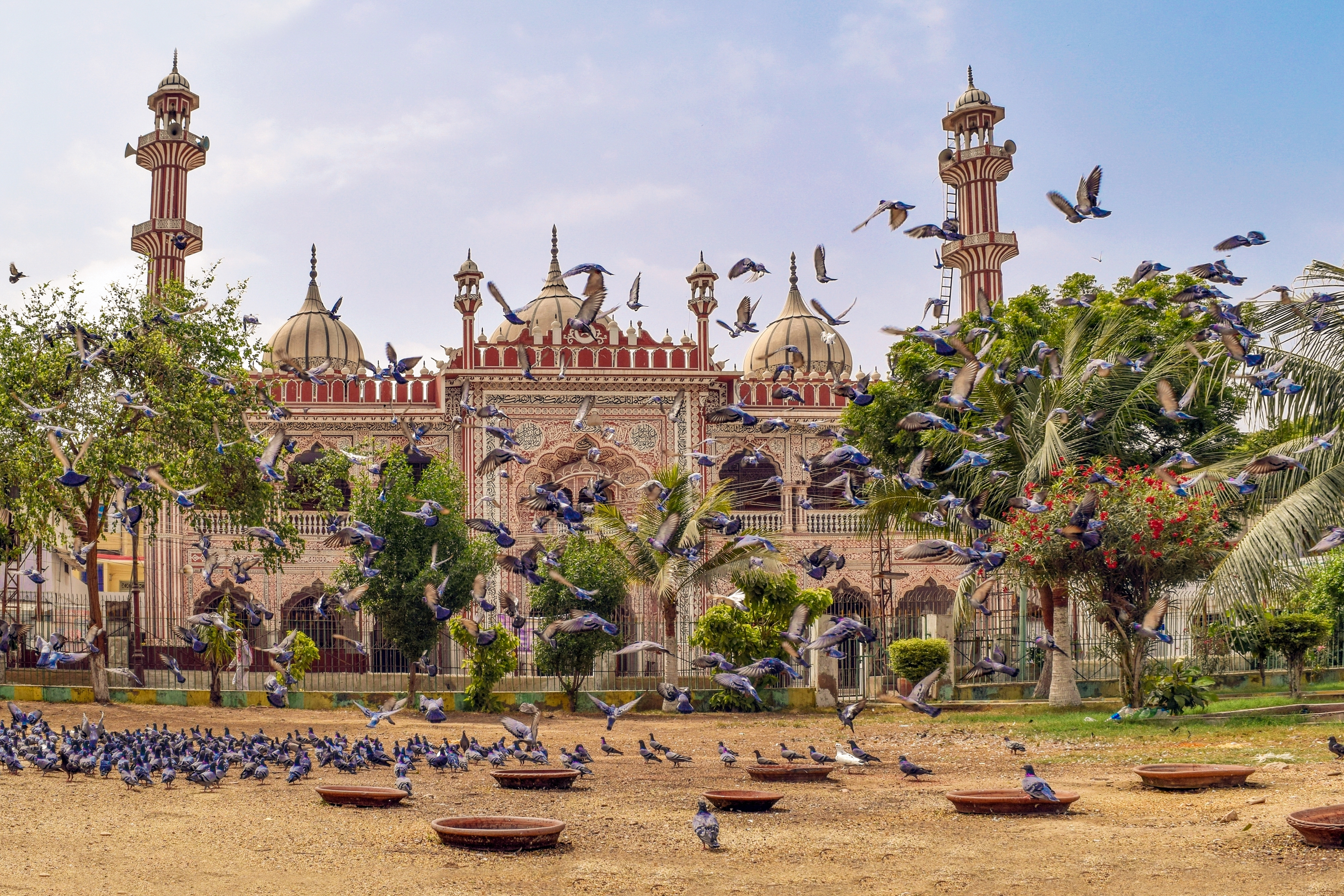
Aram Bagh Mosque, across from Aram Bagh park.

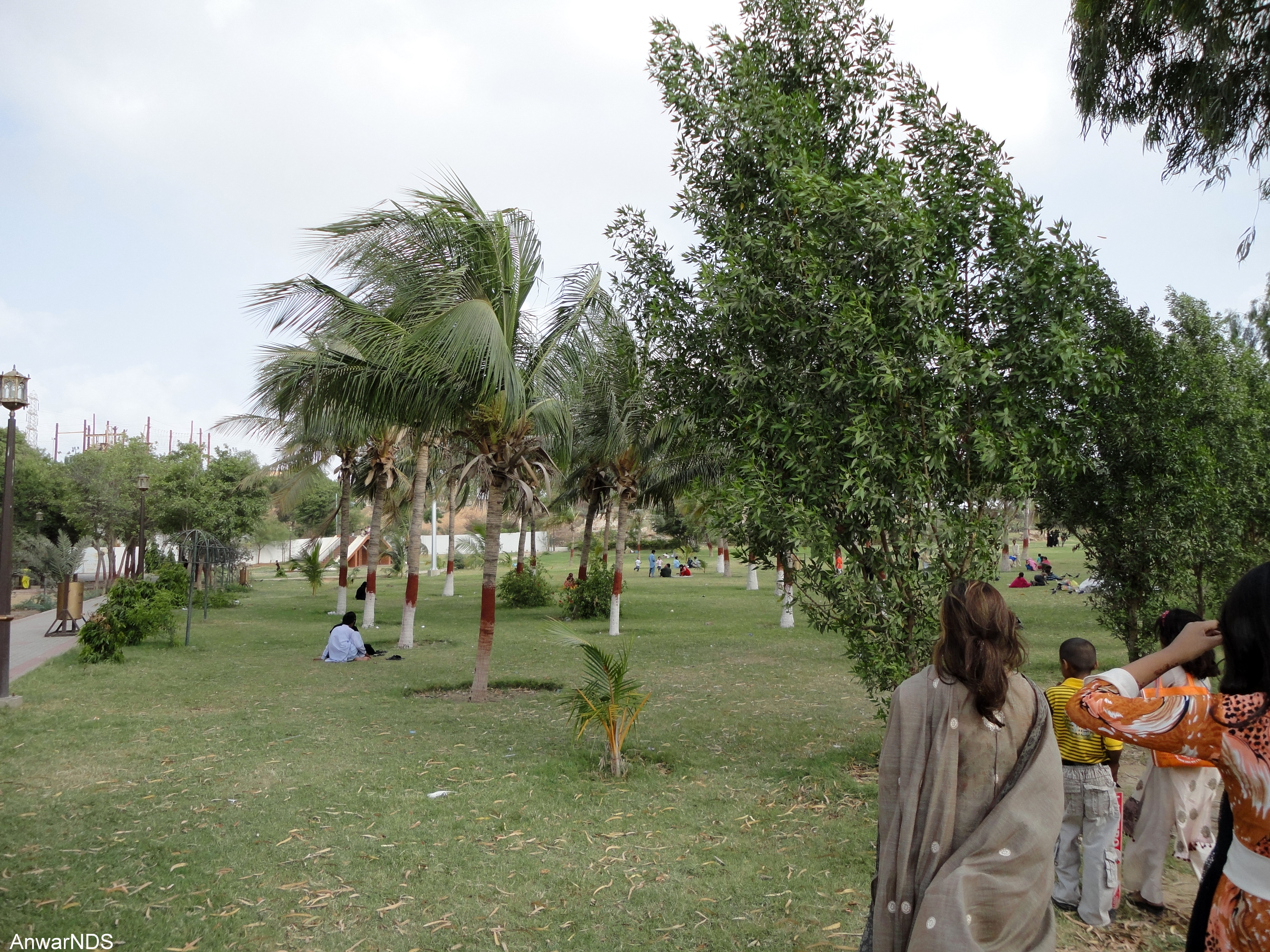
Karachi Safari Park.

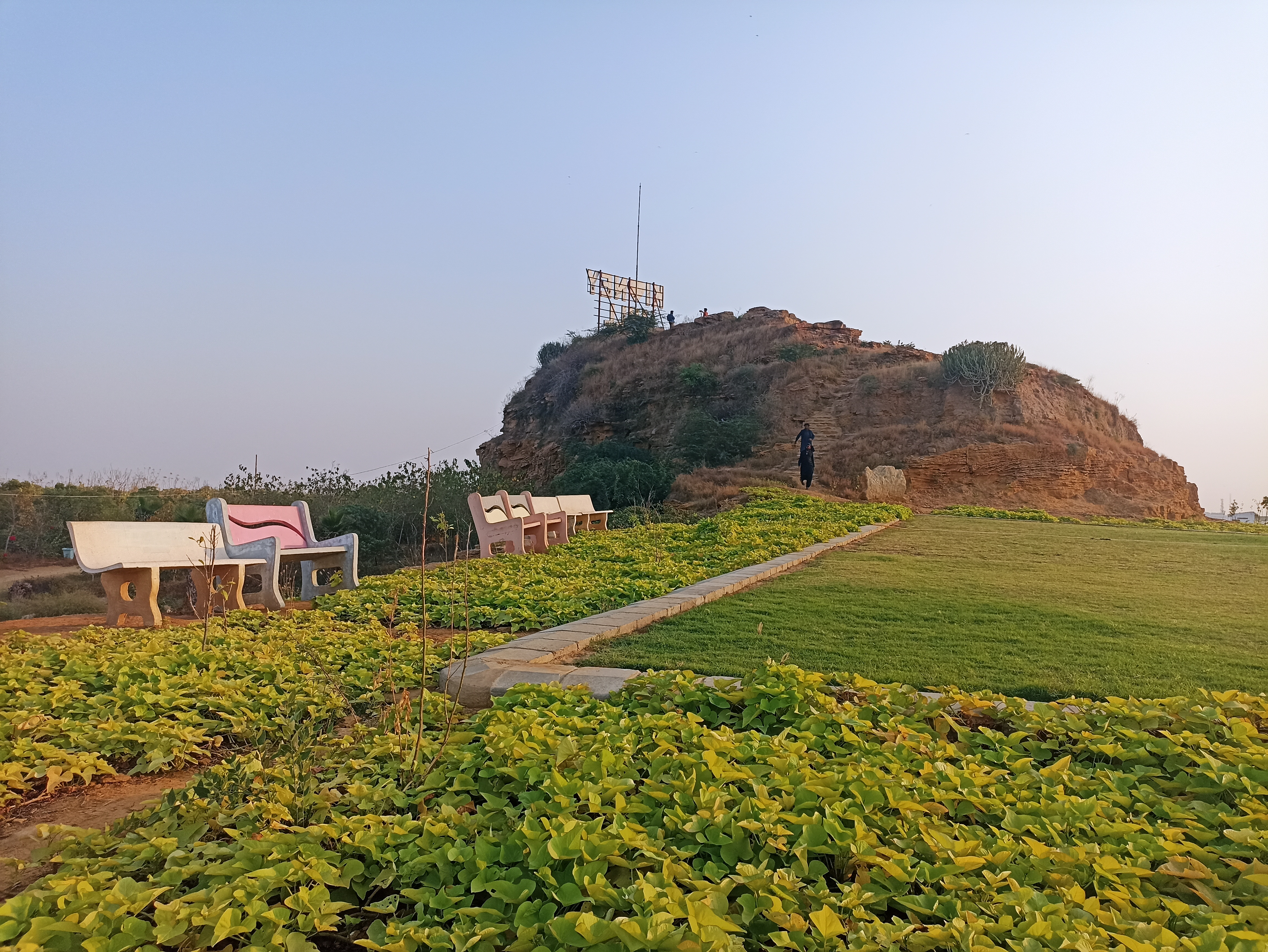
Jabl-e-Tariq in Kidney Hill Park

- Aram Bagh
- Aziz Bhatti Park
- Bagh Ibne Qasim, Clifton
- Bagh-e-Jinnah
- Bagh-e-Quaid-e-Azam (popularly known as Polo Ground)
- Boat Basin Park
- Go Aish
- Hasrat Mohani Model Park
- Hill Park
- Kidney Hill Park
- Jehangir Kothari Parade
- Jheel Park
- Karachi Safari Park
- Karachi Zoo
- Kite Park
- Landhi Korangi Zoo
- Nishtar Park
- Safari Park
- Talimi Bagh
- Zamzama Park
- Aunty Park Clifton
- Mir Usman Ali Khan Parda Park & Mini Zoo
- Pakistan-China Friendship Park
- Khalid Shaheed Park
- Nisar Shaheed Park
- People's Square
- Allama Iqbal Park
- DanZoo
- Mangrove Biodiversity Park
- KMC Sports Complex
- Chota Noorani Dhabeji Picnic Point
- Hilal Park
- Elixir Zoo
- Chirpy Park
- Triangular Park Clifton
- Jahangir Park

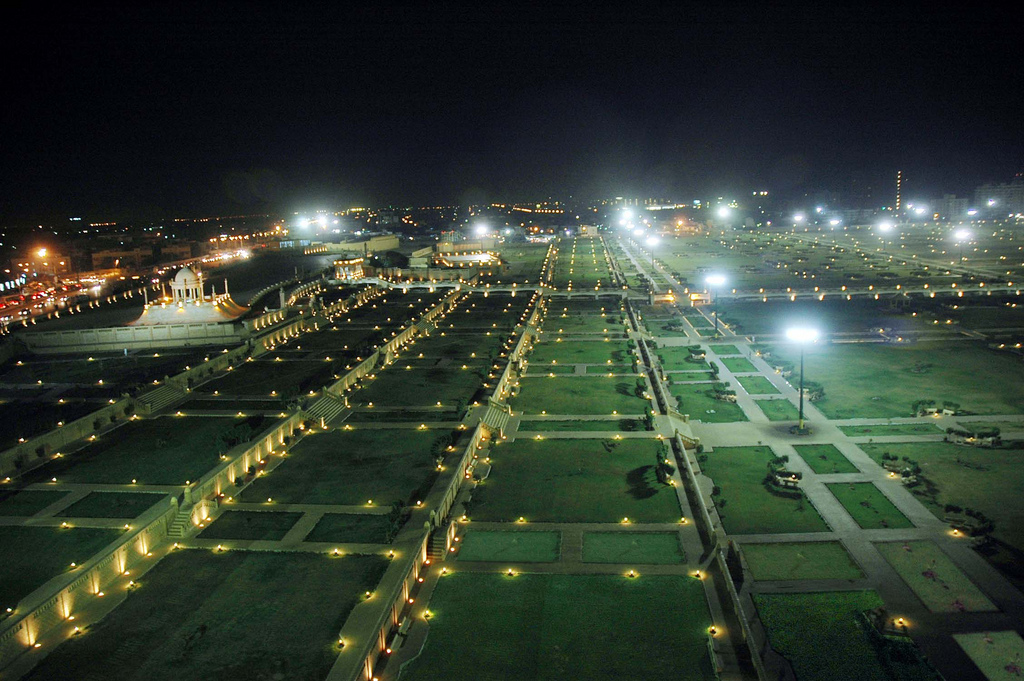
Bagh Ibn-e-Qasim Park, Karachi

== Amusement Parks ==
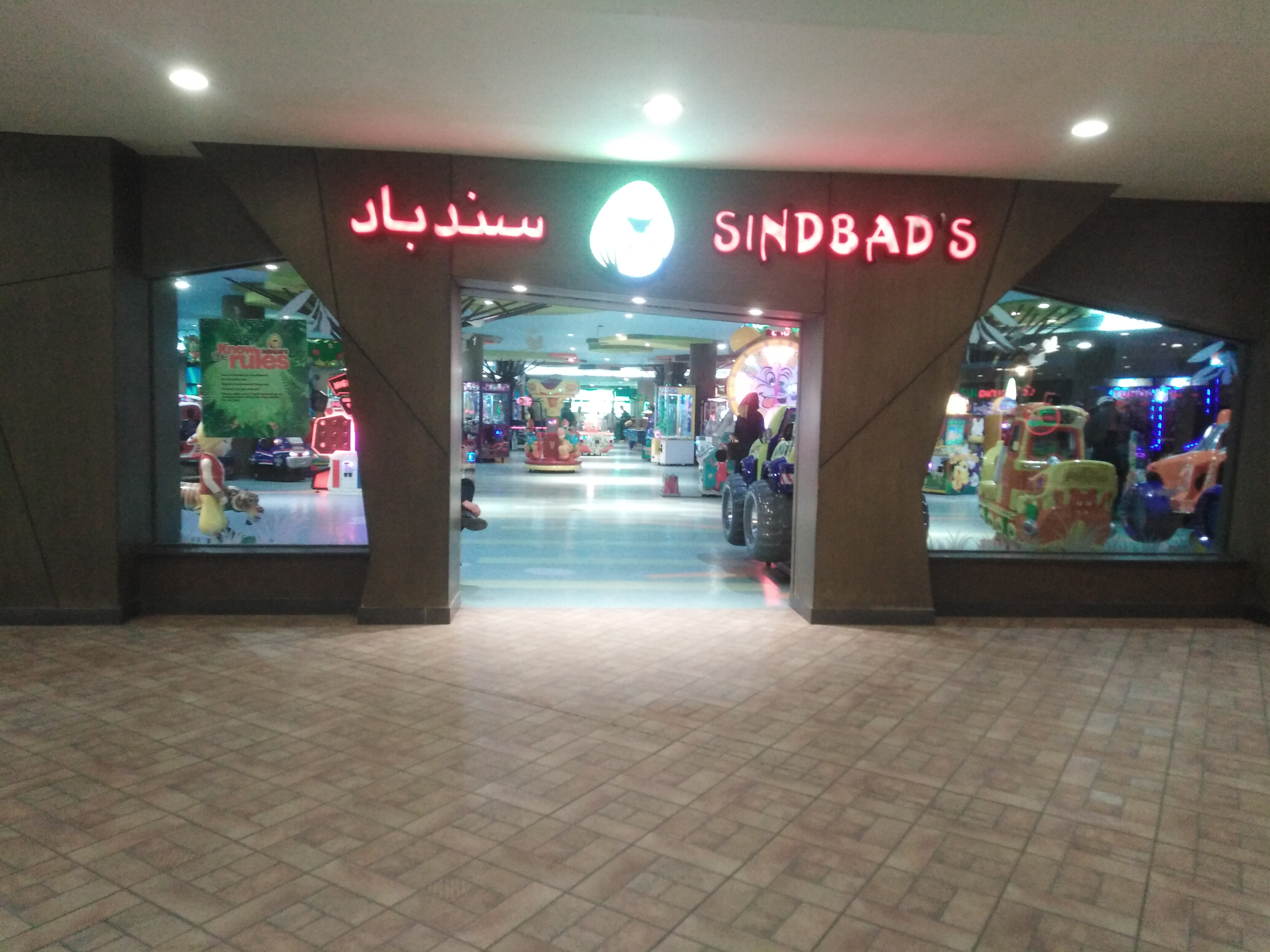
Sinbad Amusement Play Area in Dolmen Mall, Tariq Road, Karachi

- Fun City, Hill Park
- Bahria Adventure Land
- Sindbad Amusement Parks
- Super Space
- Winterland
- Chunky Monkey Amusement Park
- Kashmir Amusement Park
- Atlantis Indoor Theme Park
- Onederland
- Jabees Funland
- Jumbo Jump
- Fly Safari Karachi
- Safari Park
- Dreamworld Resort & Golf Course
- Oasis Adventure Resort
- Arena - Family Recreational & Sports Complex
- Pakistan Airforce Museum Playland
- Flip Factory
- PeakaBear
- Giggle Town
- Triangular Park, Clifton

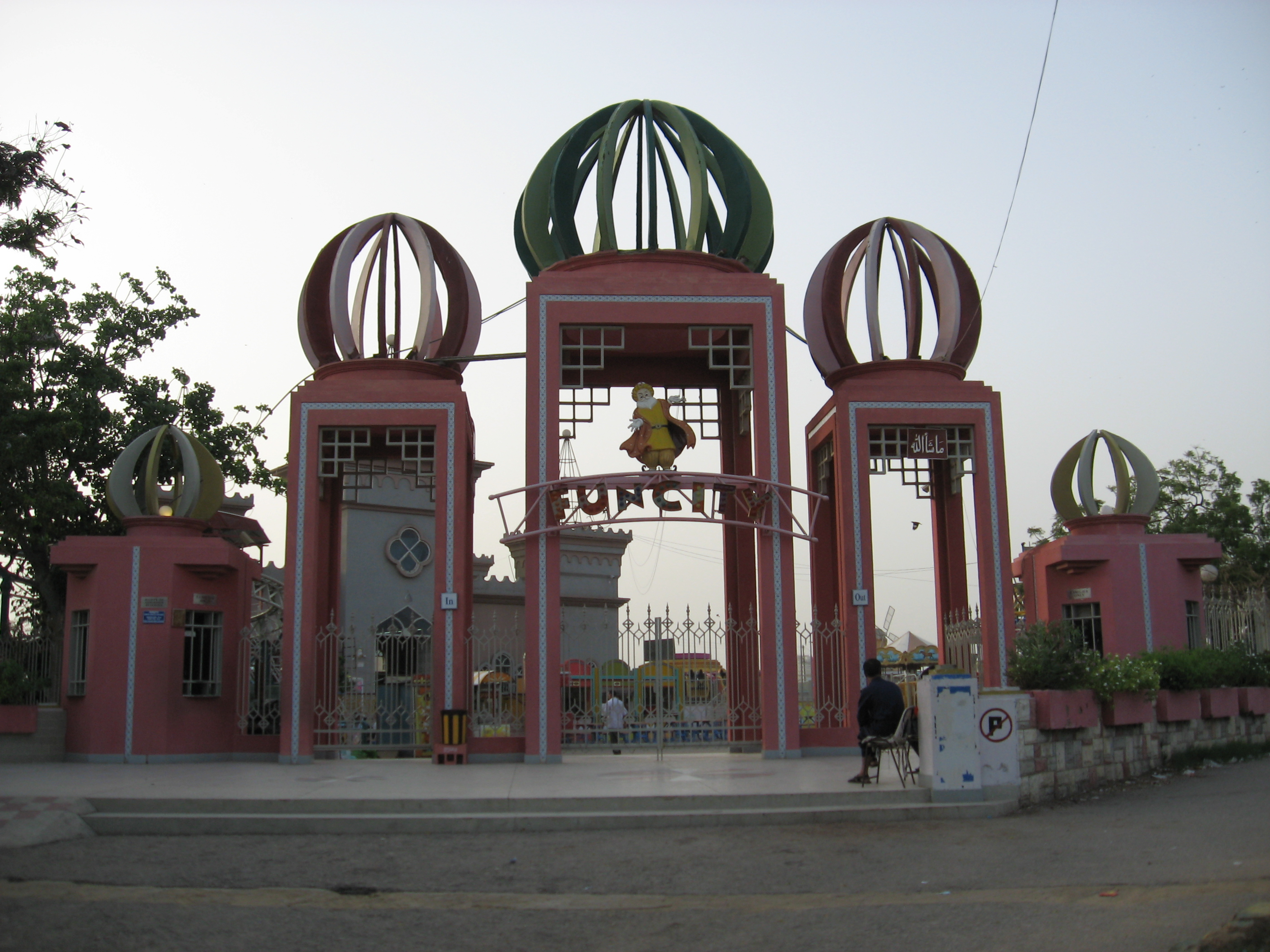
Fun City, Hill Park, Karachi

== Water Parks ==
- Wild Venture Water Park
- Picnic World Water Park
- The Great Fiesta
- Dreamworld Resort & Golf Course
- Water World Water Park
- Cosy Water Park
- Al Mehran Water Park
- Aquatic Adventureland
- Sun Rise Water Park
- Cheeku Water Park
- Samzu Park
- Airmen Golf Club & Recreational Park

=== Nearby Water Parks ===
- Sunway Lagoon Water Park
- Burhani Recreational Park
- Paradise Island Water Park

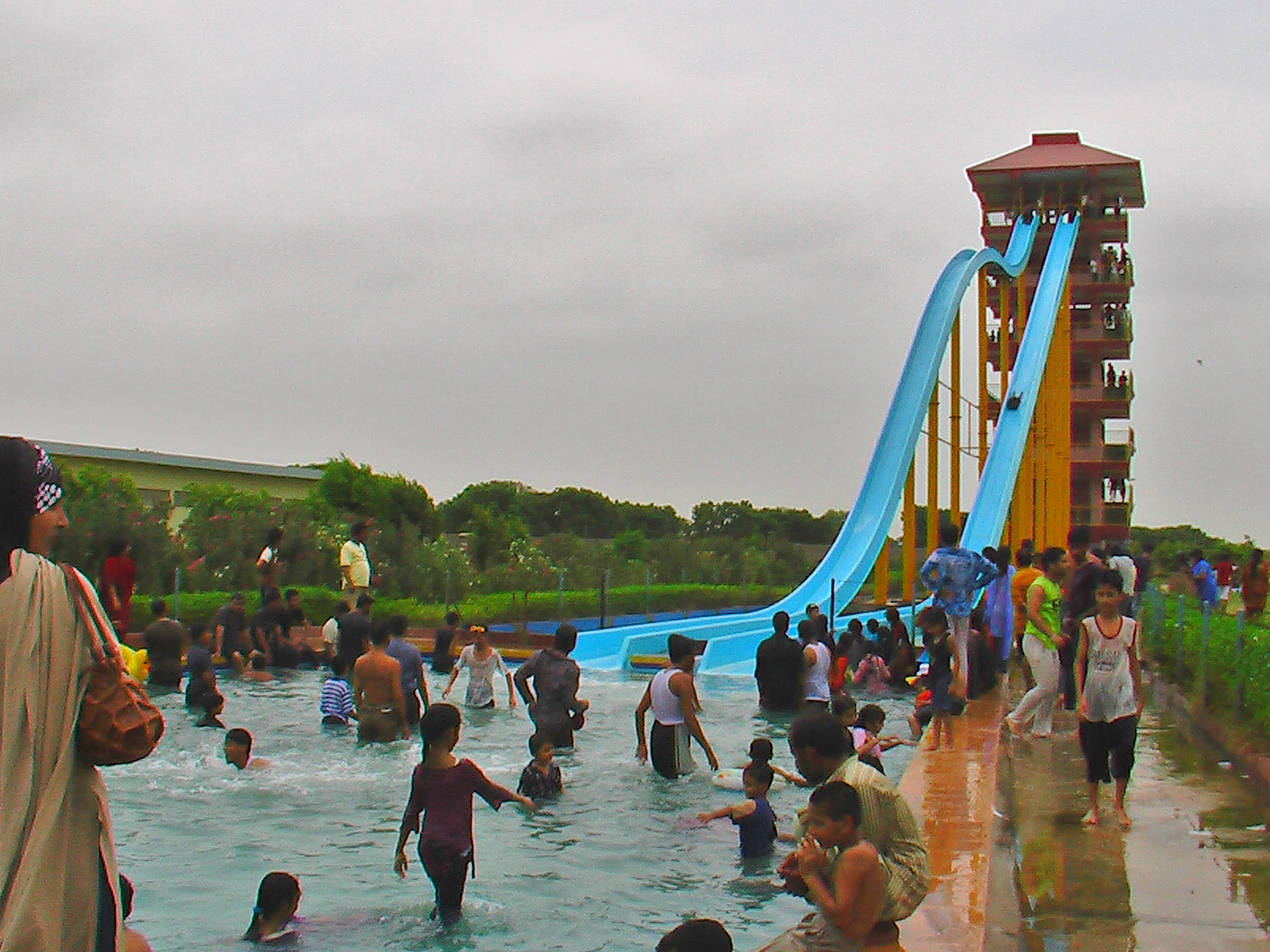
The Great Fiesta Water Park, Karachi

== Water Sports ==
- Churna Island
- Aqua Marine Beach
- Defence Authority Marina Club
- Karachi Water Sports Club
- Savor Sports
- Savor Restaurant Boating & Dining Cruise
- Port Grand Boating
- Indus Scuba
- Oceanic Cruise Line
- Pearl Cruise
- Al Noor Cruise
- Divers Club
- Paradise Cruise
- Creek Drive Cruise Boating

== Food Streets ==
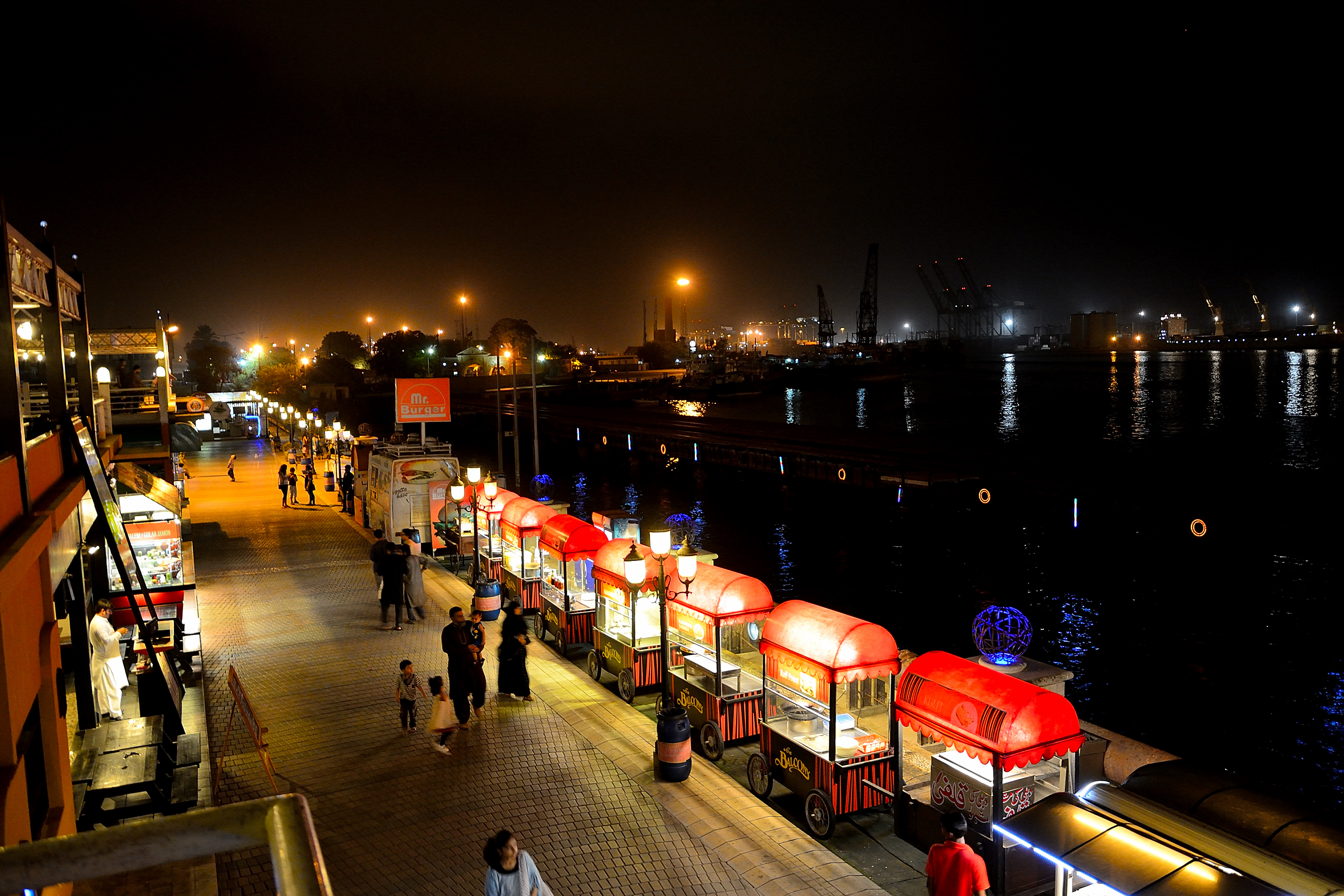
Port Grand, Karachi

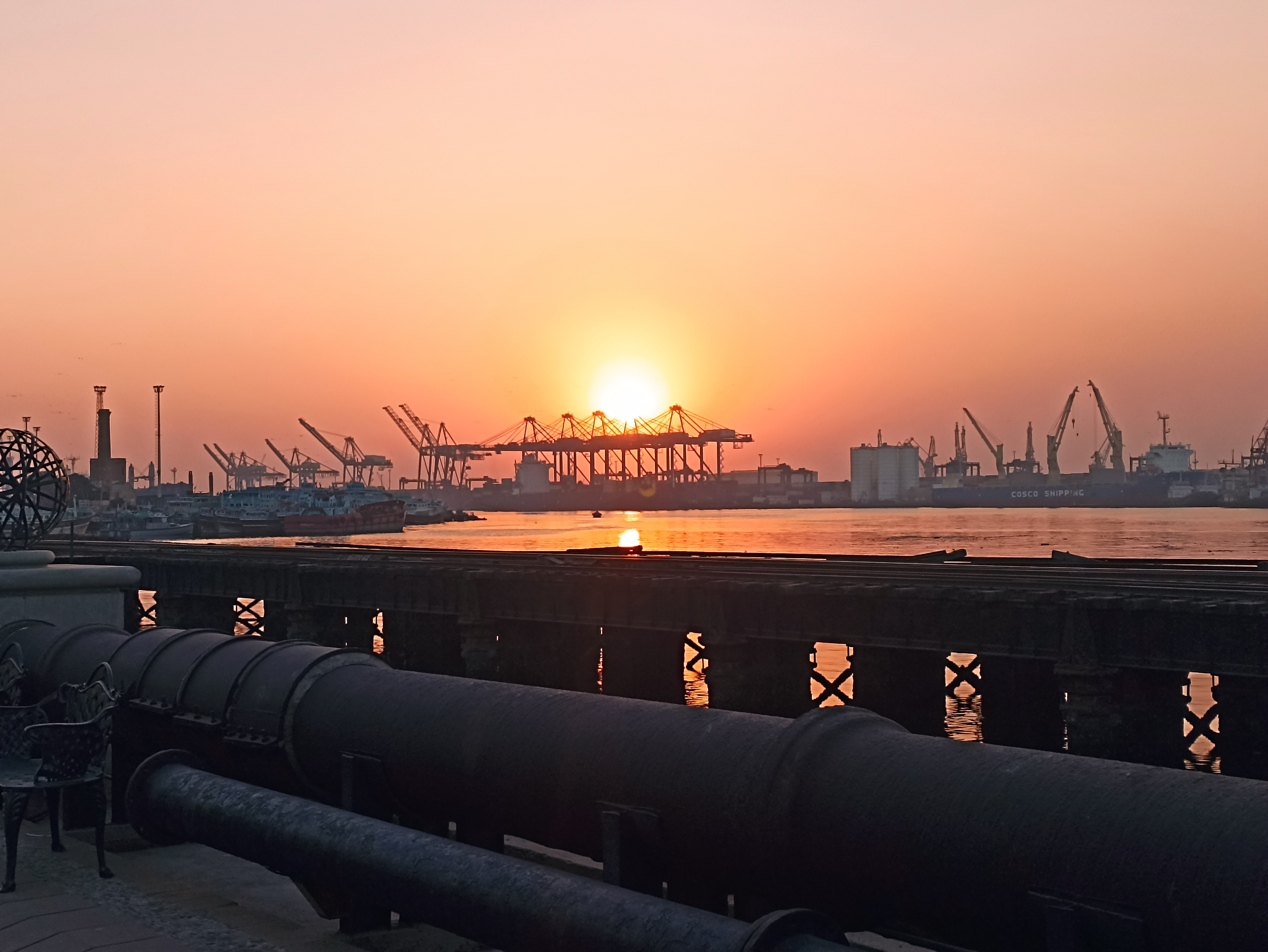
The Seaport of Karachi as seen from Port Grand

=== Recreational Food Streets ===
- Port Grand
- Creek Walk Food Street
- People's Square
- North Walk Food Court
- Khao Galli
- Food Walk, SMCHS

=== Roadside Food Streets ===
- Burns Road Food Street
- Hussainabad Food Street
- Sharafabad Food Street
- Bahadurabad Food Street
- Dhoraji Food Street
- Hassan Square Food Street
- Maskan Food Street
- Gulistan-e-Johar Food Street
- Boat Basin Food Street
- DHA Food Streets

=== Sea Facing Food Streets ===
- Do Darya
- Port Grand
- Sea View
- Creek Drive in DHA Phase 8

=== Fish Food Streets ===
- Keamari Fish Food Street
- Hassan Square Food Street

=== Highway Food Streets ===
- Superhighway Food Street

=== Horror Cafés ===
- Haunted Café, Hasan Square
- Kababjees Horror Café

=== Cruise Dining ===
- Oceanic Cruise Line
- Savor Restaurant Boating & Dining Cruise

== Nearby attractions ==
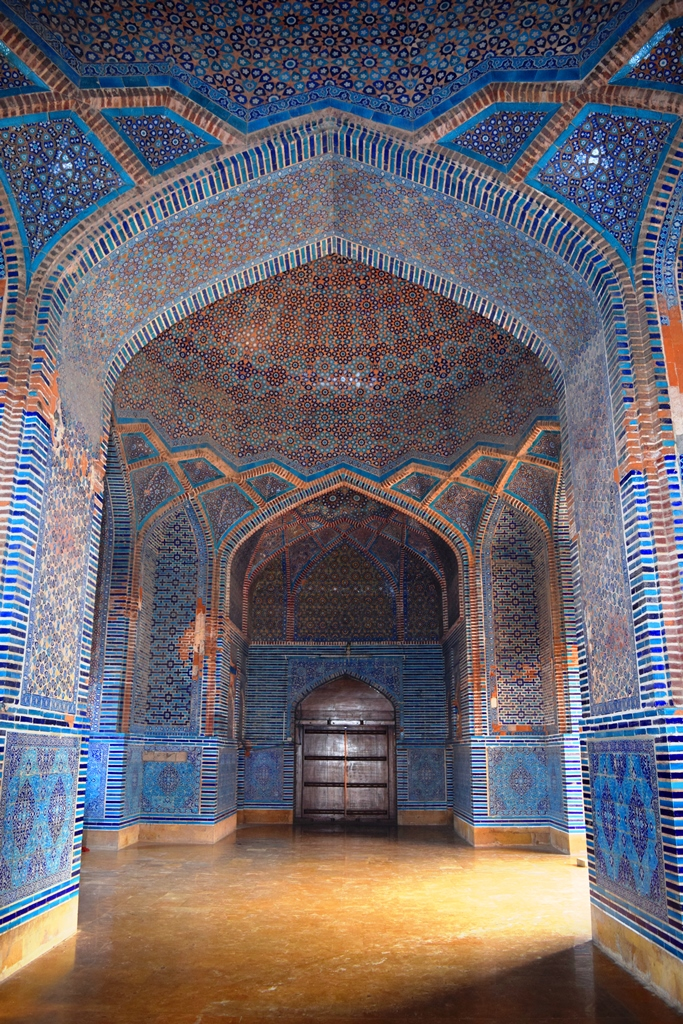
Shah Jahan Mosque.

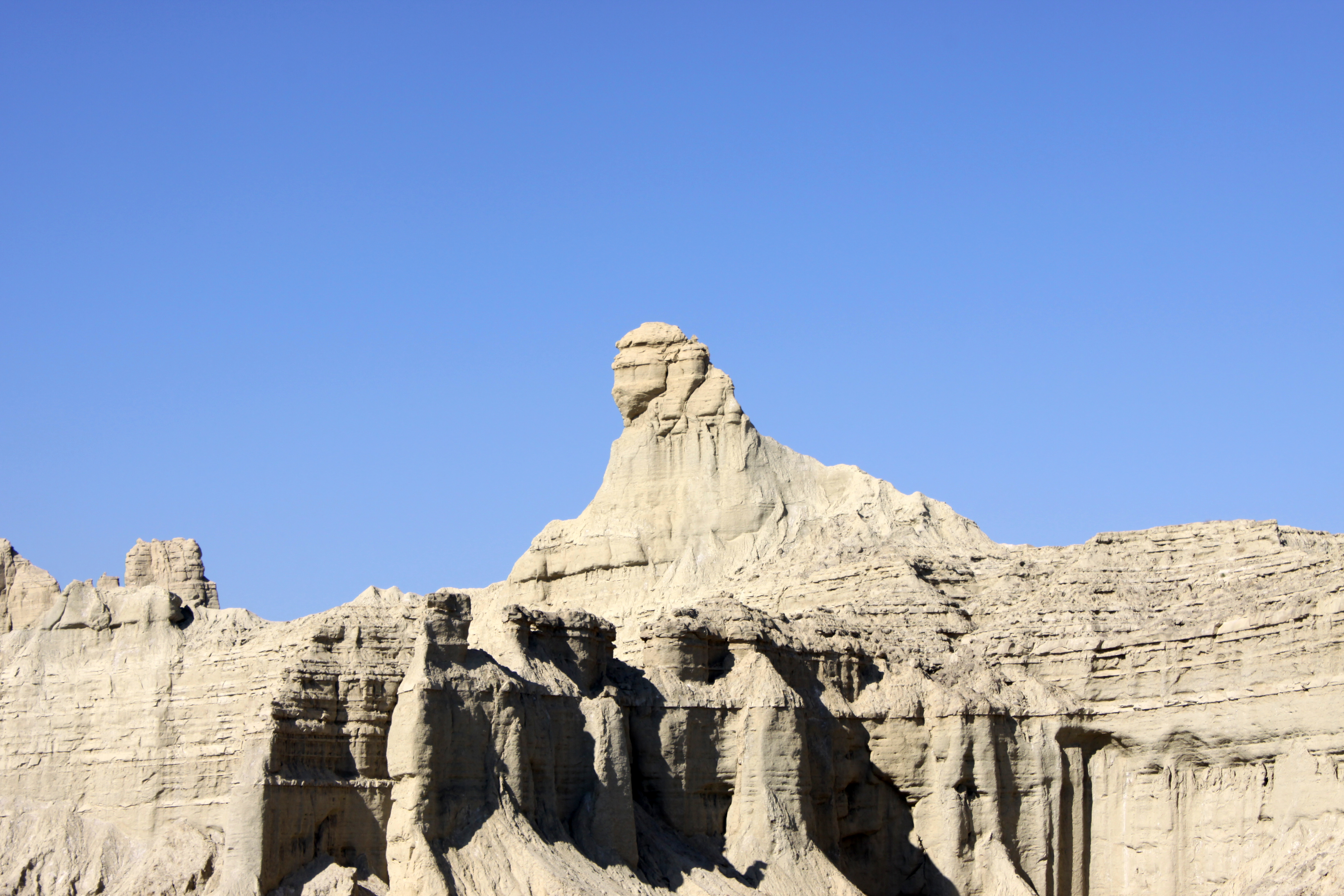
Balochistan Sphinx—A Natural Rock Formation

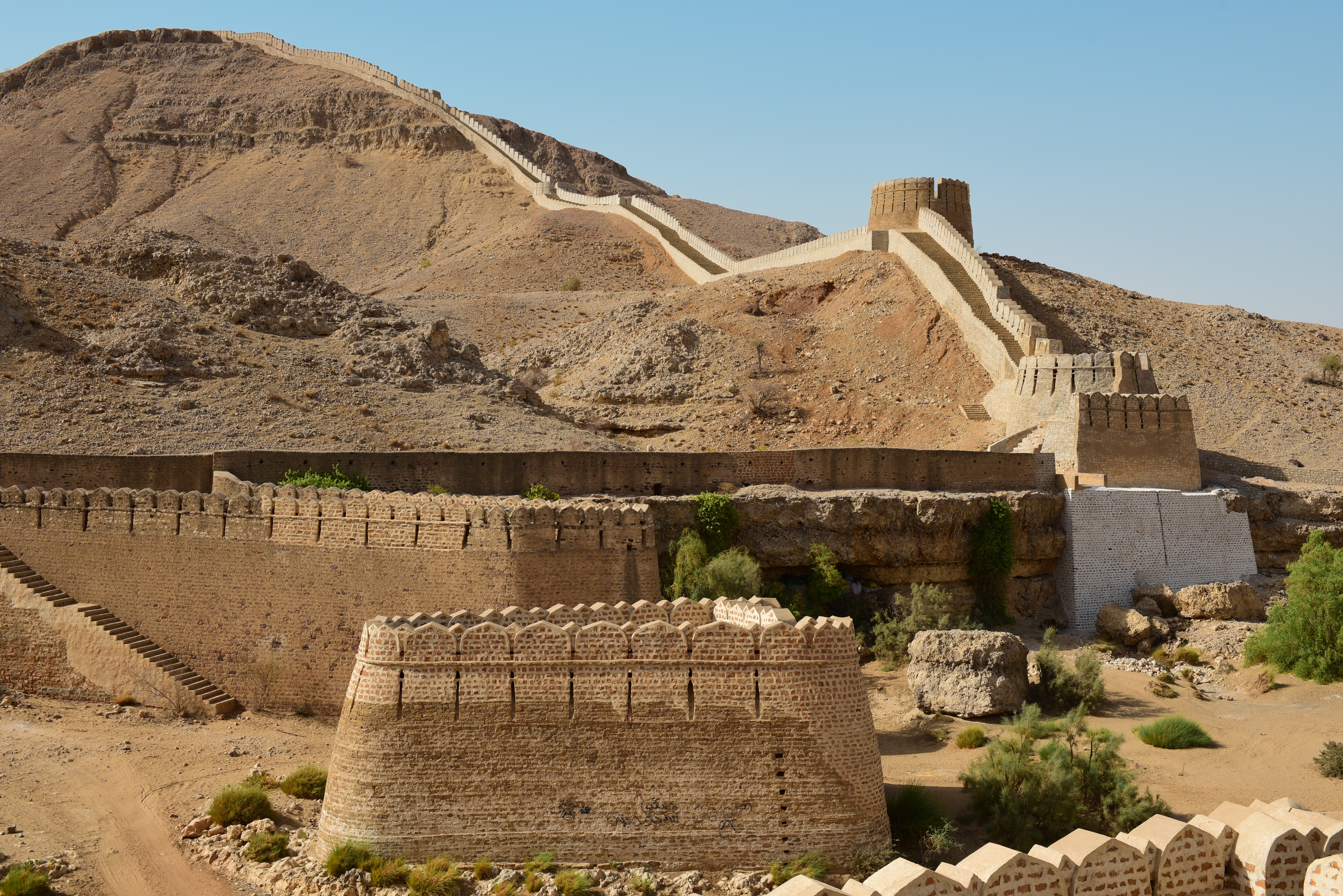
Ranikot Fort

- Hingol National Park
- Kirthar National Park
- Hub Dam
- Keenjhar Lake
- Makli Necropolis
- Shah Jahan Mosque
- Ranikot Fort
- Kund Malir Beach
- Golden Beach
- Princess of Hope
- Balochistan Sphinx
- Hingol mud volcanoes
- Buji Koh
- Ormara Beach
- Gadani Beach
- Mundywari Beach
- Damb Desert Beach
- Tilismati Beach
- Pokhara Beach, Gadani
- Sapat Beach
- Sonmiani Beach
- Shrine of Lal Shahbaz Qalandar
- Banbhore
- Banbhore Museum
- Lahari Bandar
- Haleji Lake
- Buzi Pass and Buzi Top
- Allana Gadoor Village Beach
- Phosi Gorge
- Tubko Waterfall
- Chanesar Waterfall
- Sakran Canal
- Porali River
- Bela Kundi Picnic Point
- Mithri Gulalong
- Kishari Point Lasbela
- Wahi Lasbela

== Islands ==
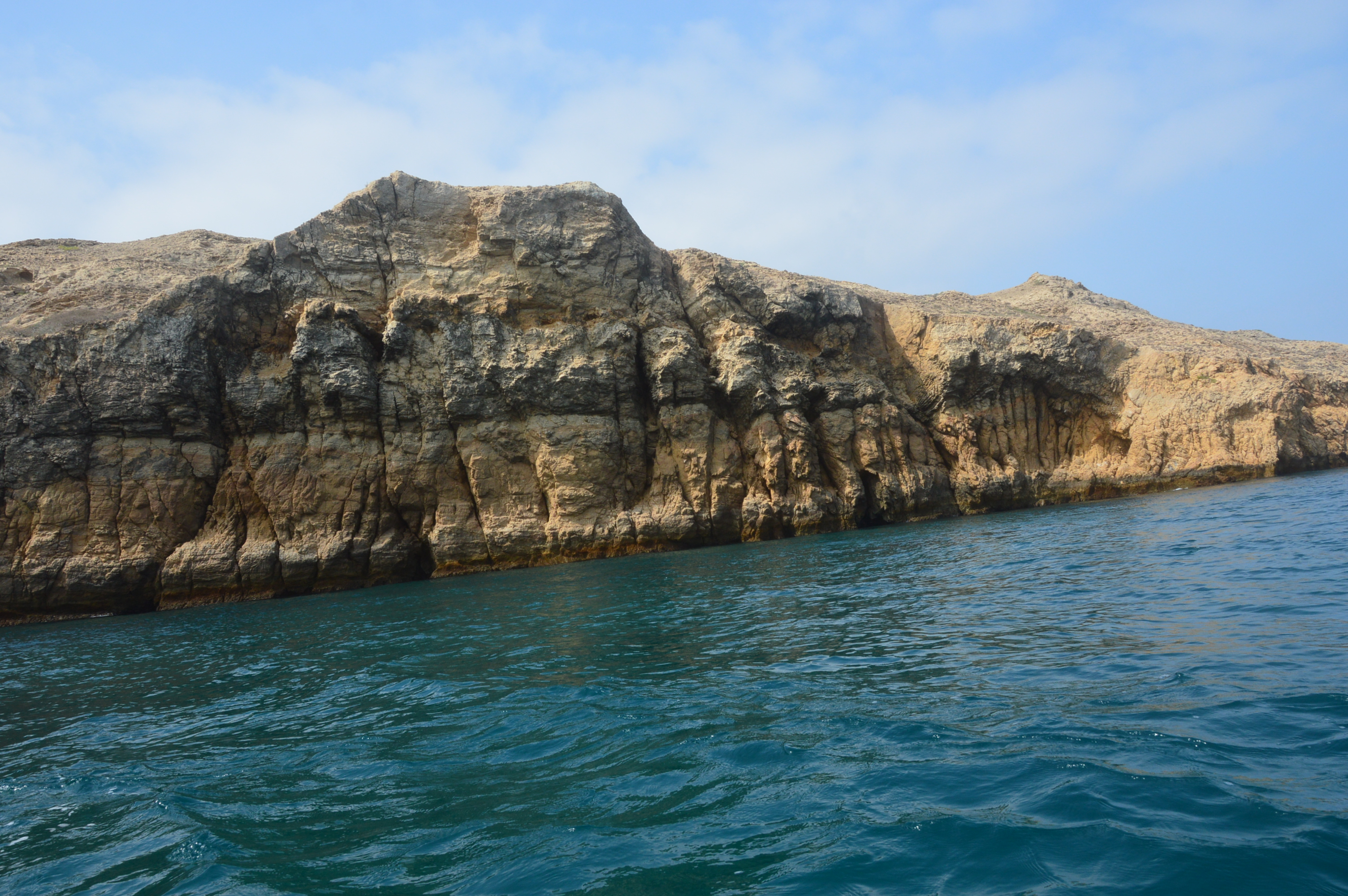
Churna Island

- Baba and Bhit Islands
- Buddo Island
- Bundal Island
- Clifton Oyster Rocks
- Khiprianwala Island
- Manora
- Shams Pir
- Churna Island
