= Golimar, Karachi =

Residential neighbourhood in Karachi, Pakistan

Coordinates: 24°53′N 67°01′E

Golimar (Urdu: گولیمار) is one of the neighbourhoods of S.I.T.E. Town in Karachi, Sindh, Pakistan. The name of Golimar has been changed to Gulbahar.

There are several ethnic groups in Golimar including Muhajirs, Christians, Punjabis, Sindhis, Kashmiris, Seraikis, Pakhtuns, Balochs, Memons, Bohras Ismailis, Chitralis etc. There is also common everyday street crime like most other places in the world, however the law and order situation of the area has been much improved after operations conducted by law enforcement agencies.

== History ==
Golimar is located along the Lyari River. Golimar area was settled by Muslim refugees after independence of Pakistan in 1947. The name "GOLIMAR" comes from the combination of two words GOLI (bullet) and MAR (fire) as before the independence of Pakistan Golimar are was the shooting range of colonial British Army. This area was still unplanned and the roads were not in grid pattern as in some other parts of Karachi. There were no schools, parks and other amenities planned in this area. It had been and still is considered a slum area of Karachi. Water Board Don Mr.Nadeem Manya Still Lives There. There is a famous brass handicrafts market, Peetal Gali, in Golimar famous for its brass work all over Pakistan.

== Recent construction ==
In 2017, a new underpass on a major road in the area is all set to open to relieve traffic congestion.

== See also ==
- Gulbahar
