= Boulton Market =

Market in Karachi

Boulton Market بولٹن مارکیٹ
- Marketplace
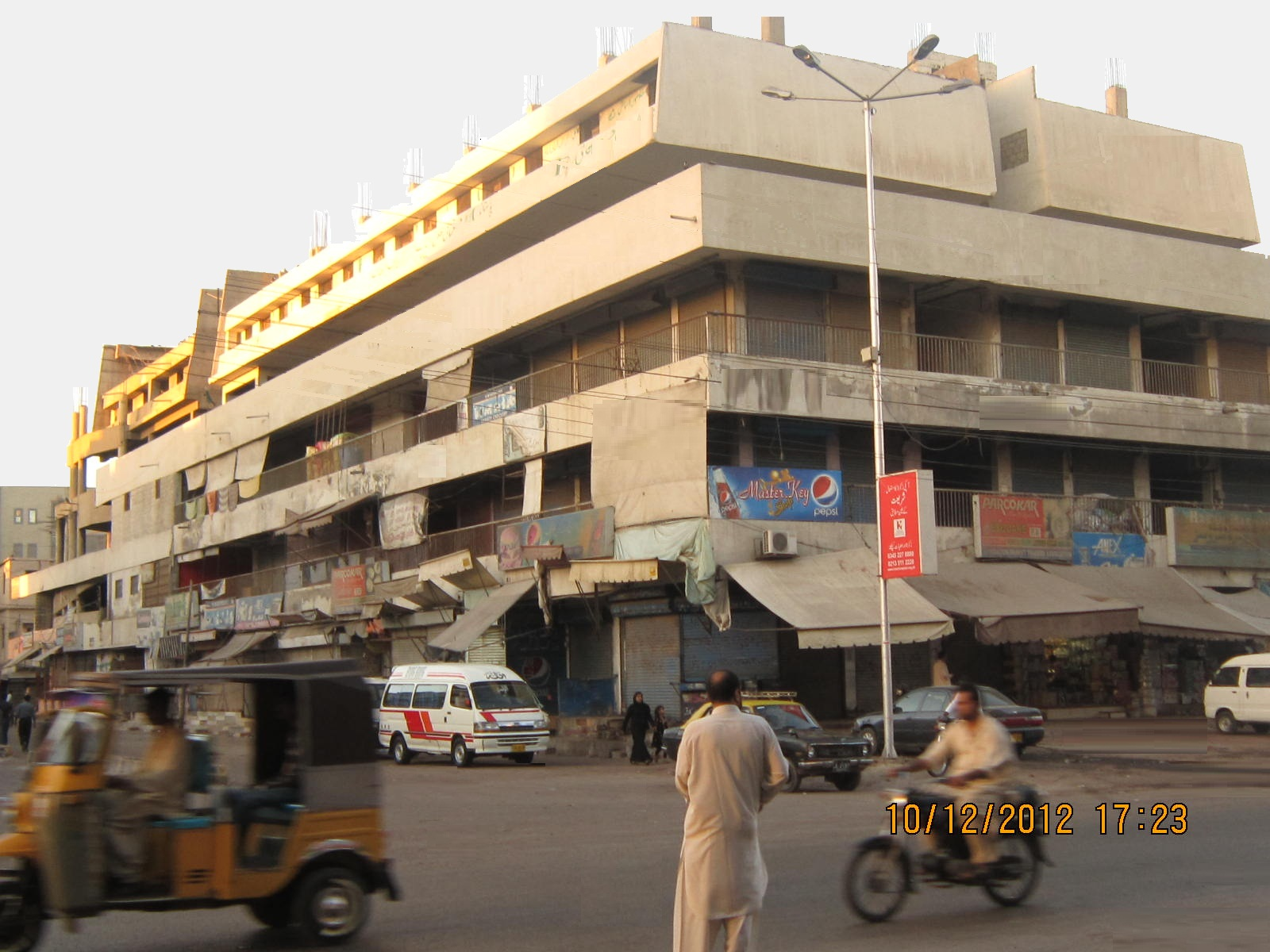
- Country: Pakistan
- Province: Sindh
- City: Karachi
- Founded: 1883
- Named for: C.F. Boulton
- Website: boltonkarachi.com

Boulton Market, also spelled Bolton Market, (Urdu: بولٹن مارکیٹ) is a 19th-century market located in Saddar, Karachi, Pakistan. It is a wholesale market, surrounded by various retail markets.

== History ==
It was built in 1883 British India as a fruit and vegetable market and was named after Colonel C.F. Boulton, then municipal commissioner of Karachi. In 1886, the size of the market was expanded in order to accommodate stalls of meat and fish.
