= French Beach, Karachi =

Beach in Karachi, Sindh, Pakistan

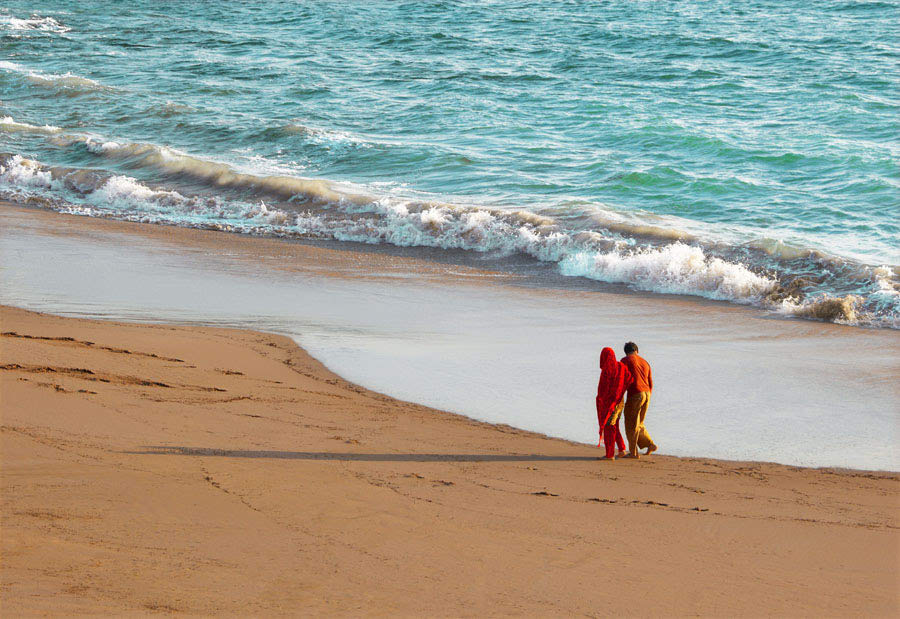
A view of French Beach, Karachi

French Beach of Karachi is located halfway between Hawkes Bay and Paradise Point, is a small fishing village frequented by Karachi's elite class and known to the locals as Haji Ismill Goth.

== Access to French Beach from Karachi ==
French Beach, located approximately 70 kilometres (43 mi) from Karachi, is accessible by road and is a popular destination for both residents and tourists. The journey can take about 2-3 hours, depending on traffic and road conditions. Travelers can drive or hire a private vehicle to reach the beach.

Driving directions

To drive to French Beach from Karachi, travelers should take the Super Highway and exit at the Thatta turnoff. Following this route provides a scenic drive through rural landscapes and small villages, offering insights into the local culture.

Car rental

Alternatively, visitors can hire a car through a rental service or their hotel in Karachi. Options include hiring a vehicle with a driver or self-driving if in possession of a valid driving license.

Activities at French Beach

French Beach is known for its array of recreational activities. Visitors can engage in various water sports and beach activities such as:

- Jet skiing
- Local-style fishing
- Kayaking
- Scuba diving
- Surfing
- Windsurfing

It is advisable for visitors to book a beach hut in advance to ensure accommodation during their visit
