= Brass Street, Karachi =

Street in Karachi, Pakistan

Brass Street
- Interactive map of Brass Street
- Location: Golimar, Karachi, Sindh, Pakistan
- Coordinates: 24°54′24″N 67°2′24″E

Other
- Known for: Brass utensil and decorative work

Brass Street, locally known as Peetal Gali, is a street located in Golimar, Karachi, a locality which lies between Nazimabad and Guru Mandir. The street is well-known for finest brass work, utensils and decoration pieces, in Pakistan.

== History ==
The artisans who work in the Brass Street, Karachi have an emigrant background who migrated from the city of Moradabad, a city known as brass city of India, after the partition of India in 1947.

Brass work is on the decline in Pakistan and the businesses which are active on the street now only deal with bulk clients who have export and import business. One reason of the decline of brass work is rising cost of coal which is used in their ovens. Their work has been exhibited in numerous countries including China.

As of January 2018, the number of shops on the street have decreased to just seven.
