= Sindbad Amusement Parks =

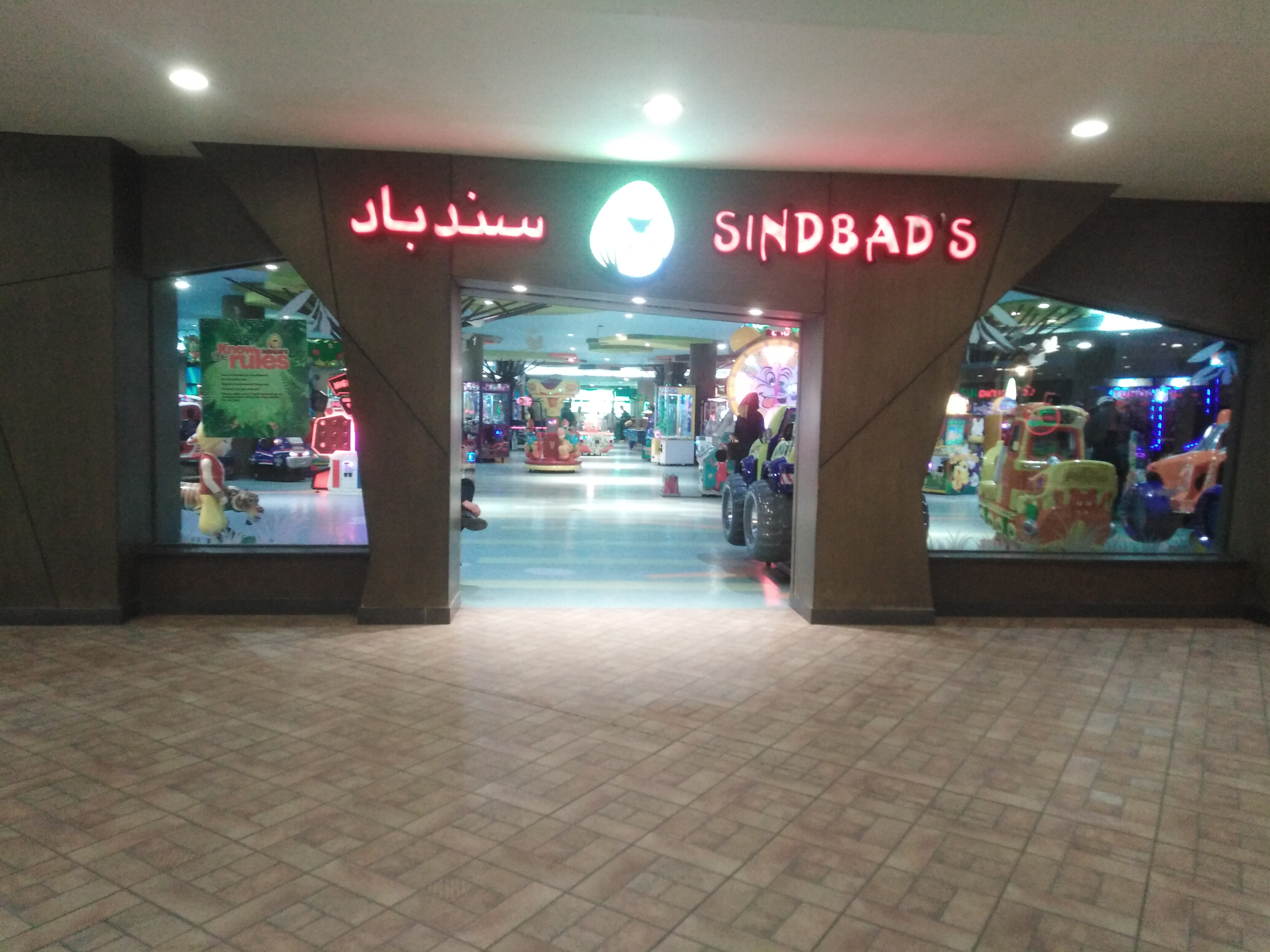
Sinbad in Dolmen Tariq Road, Karachi

The Sindbad Amusement Parks are a group of family entertainment centers and amusement parks located in the cities of Karachi, Faisalabad and Lahore in Pakistan.

In August 2015, the KDA shut down the park in Gulshan-e-Iqbal area, Karachi.

== See also ==
- List of amusement parks in Pakistan
