= List of animals representing first-level administrative country subdivisions =

This is a list of animals that represent first-level administrative country subdivisions.

== List by country ==
=== Australia ===
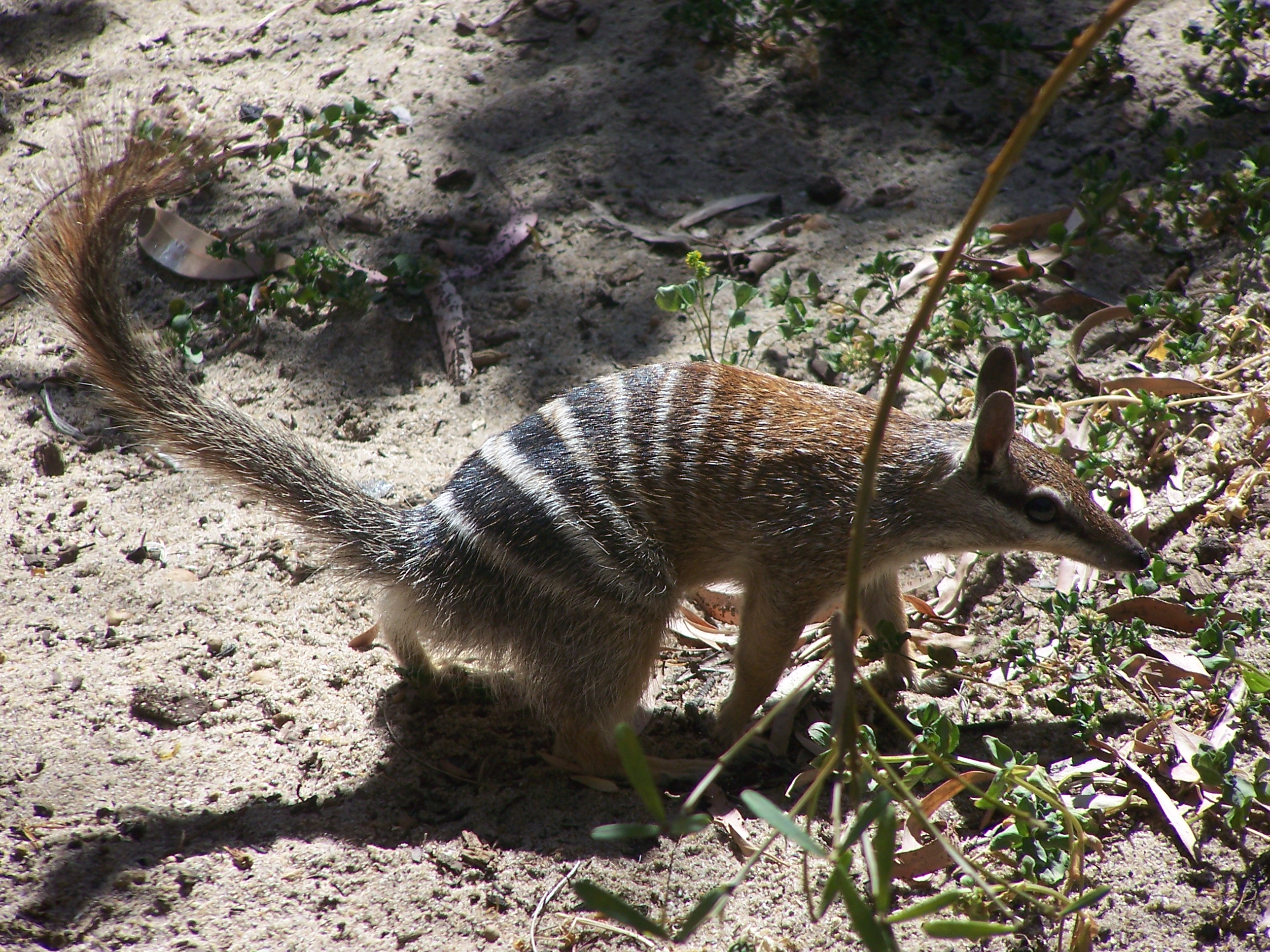
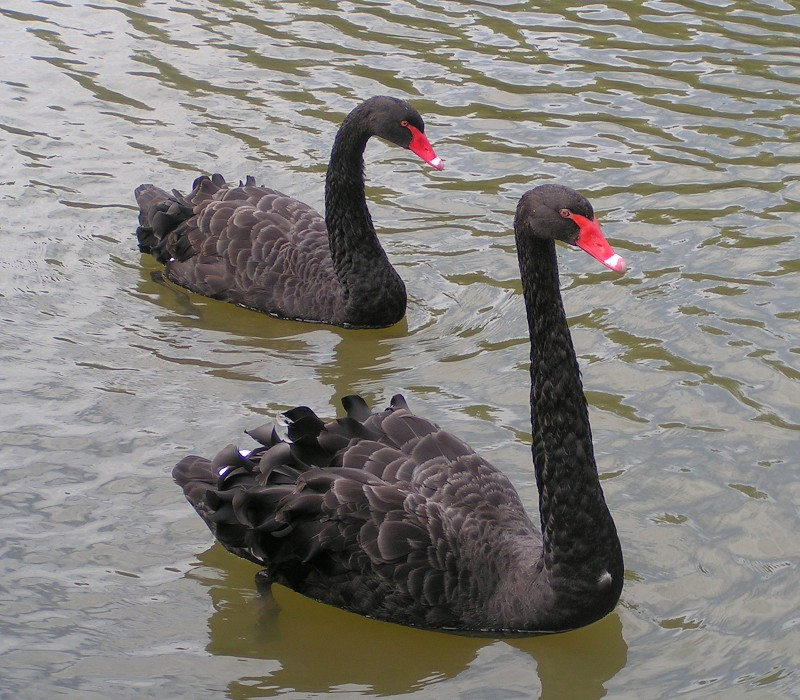
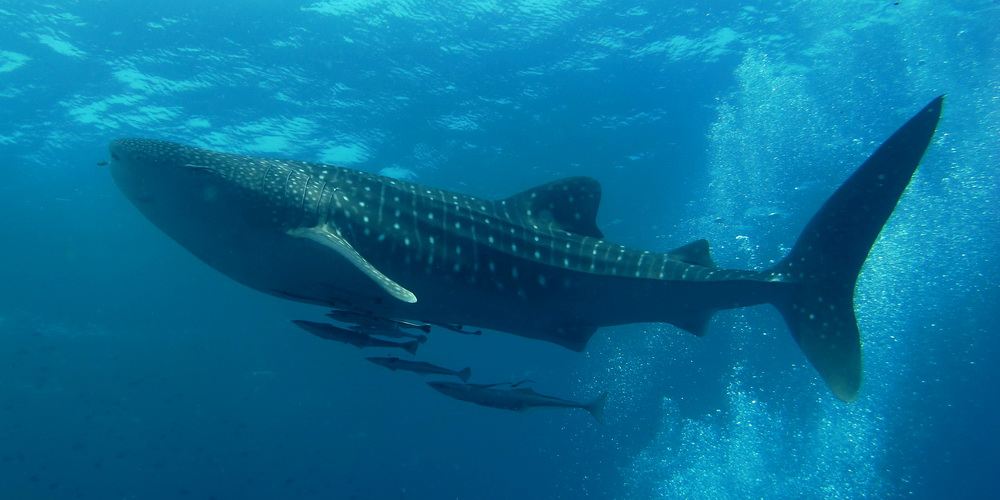
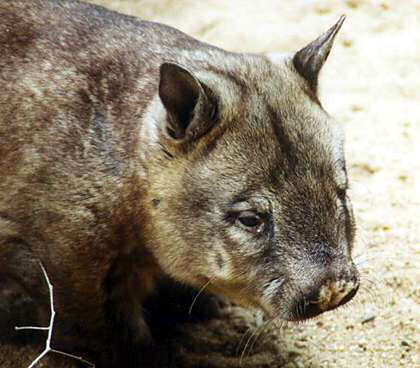
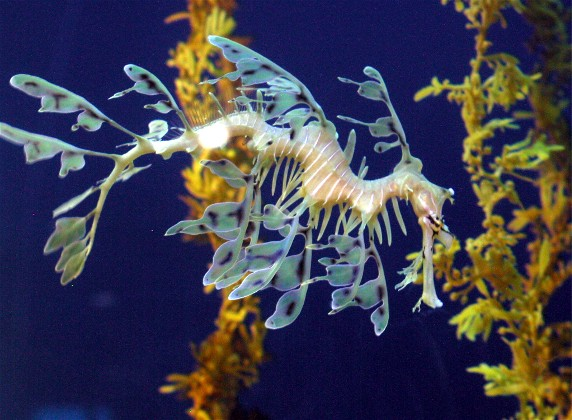
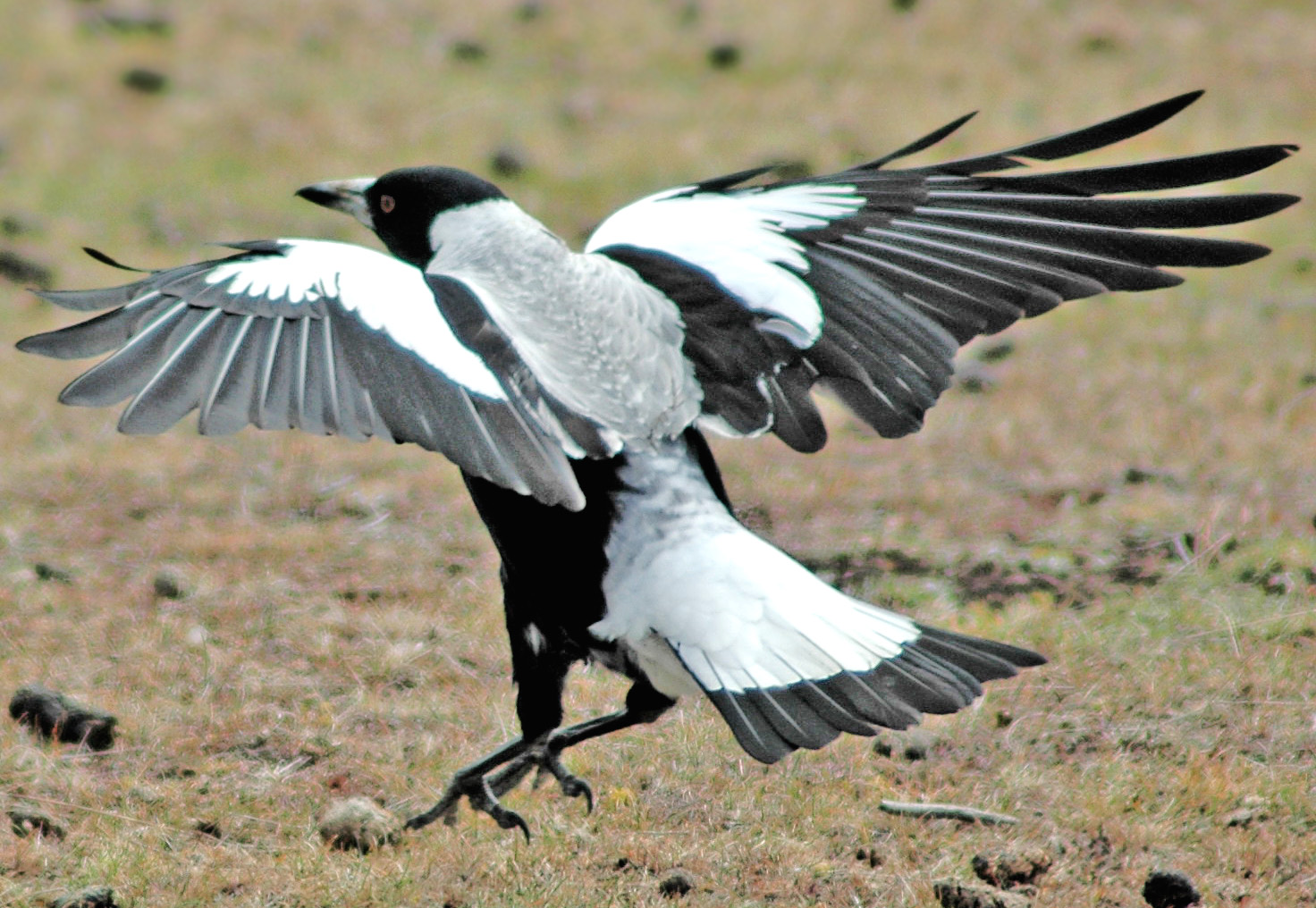
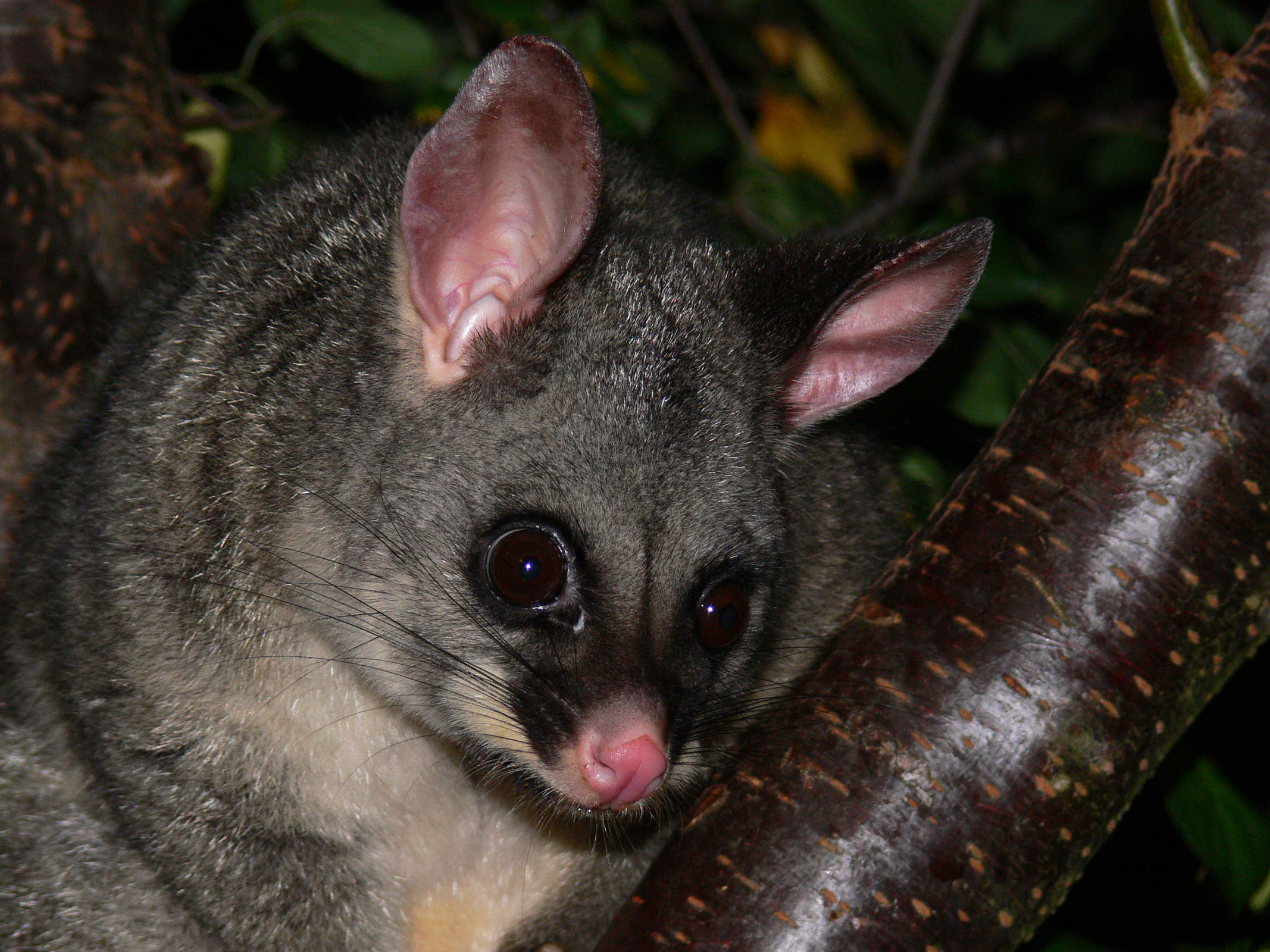
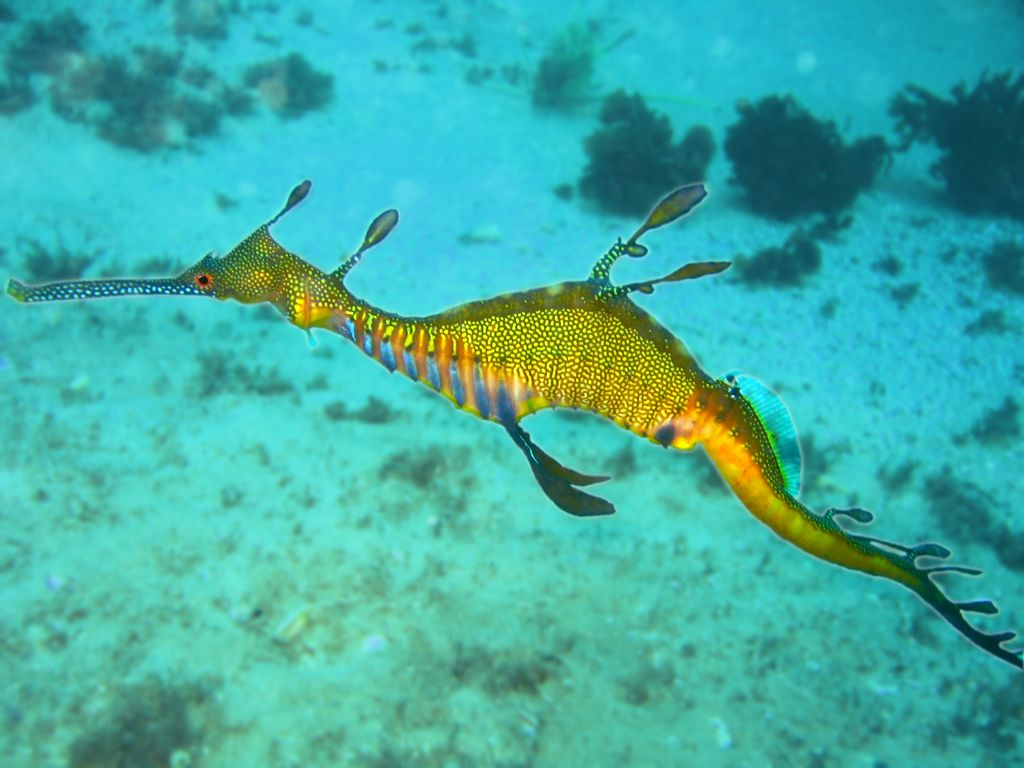
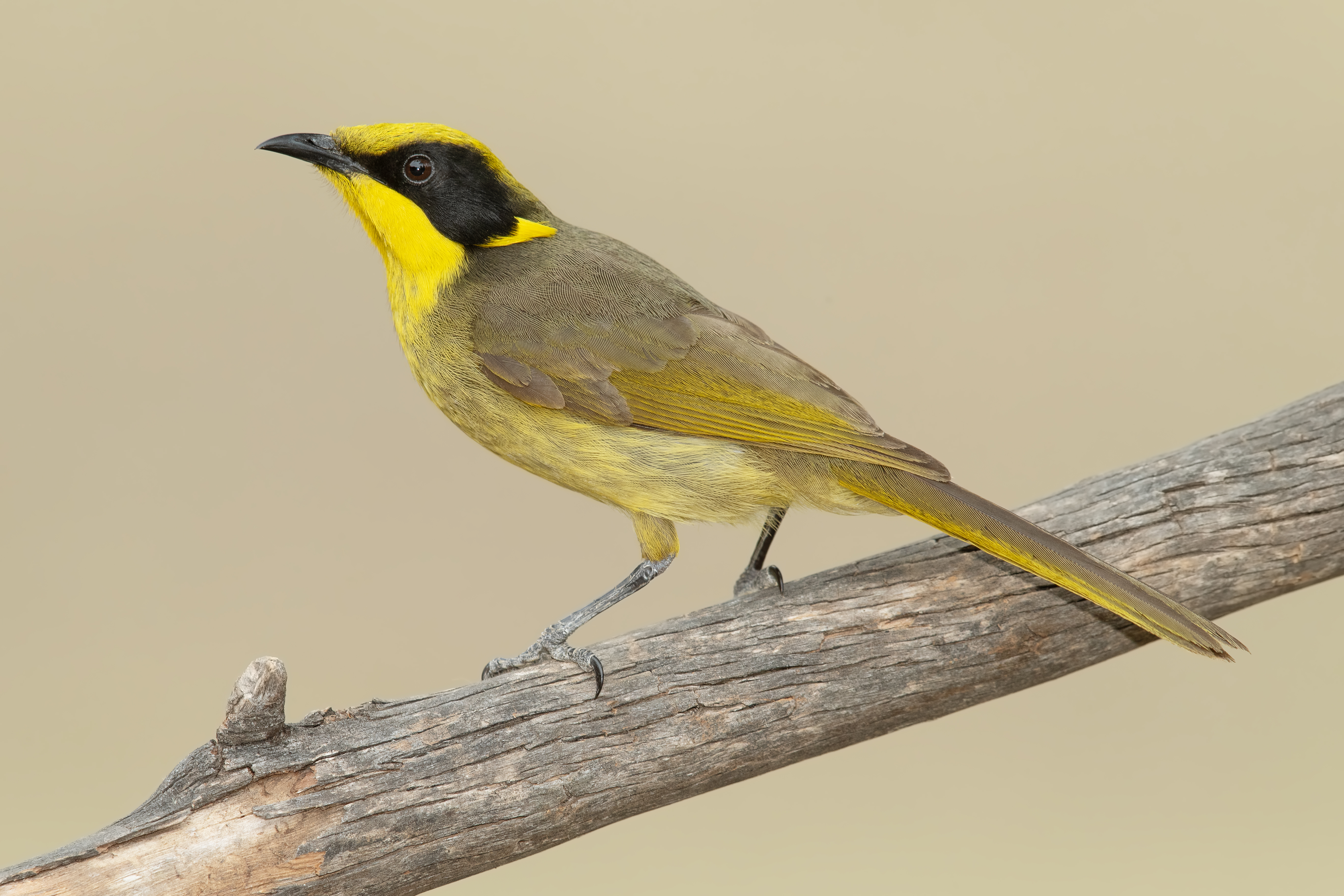
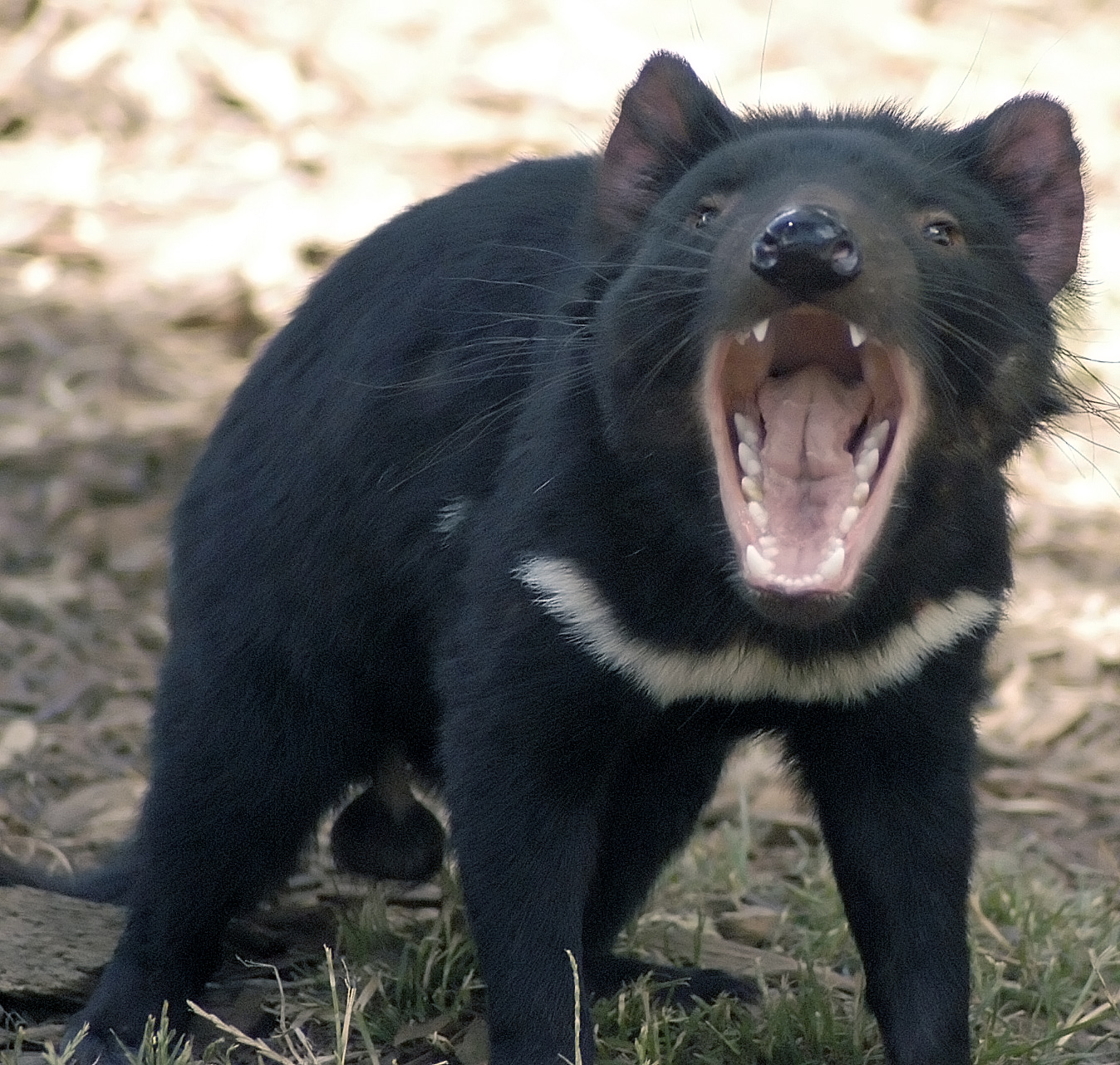
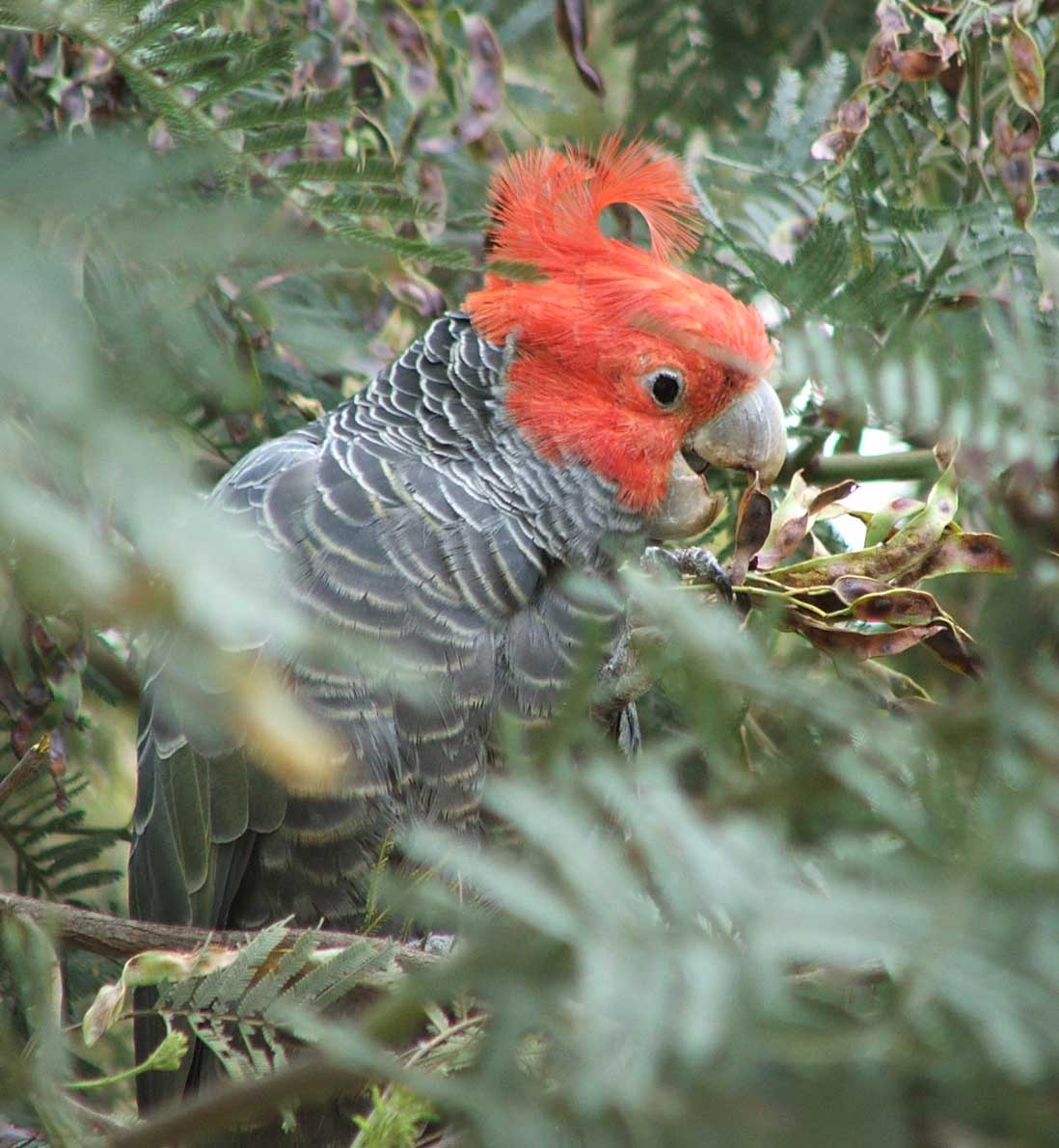
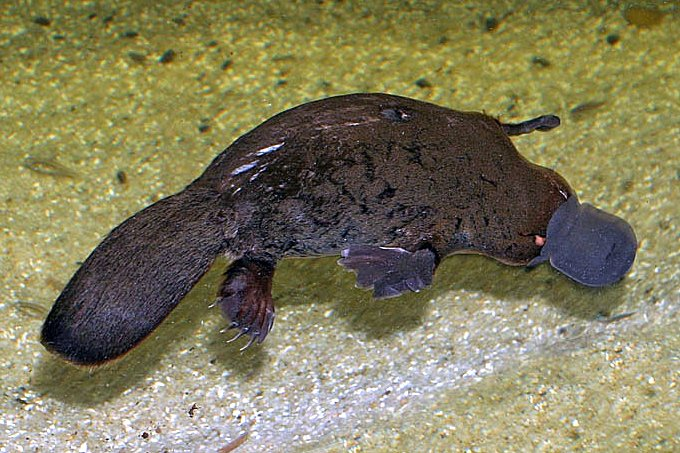
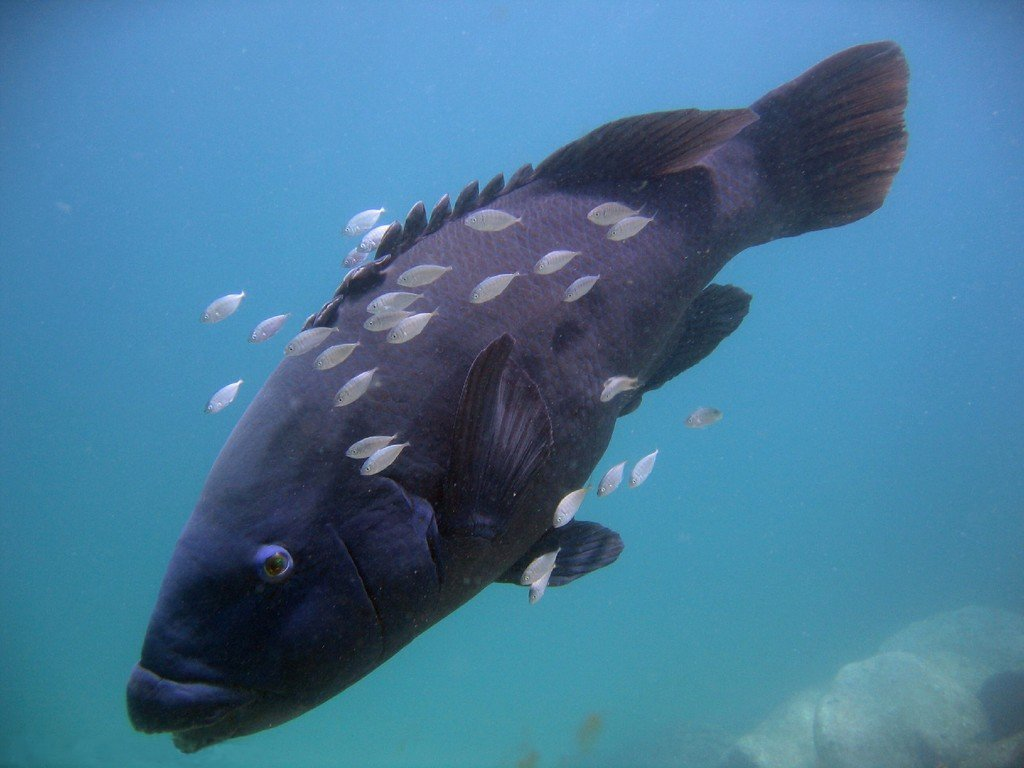
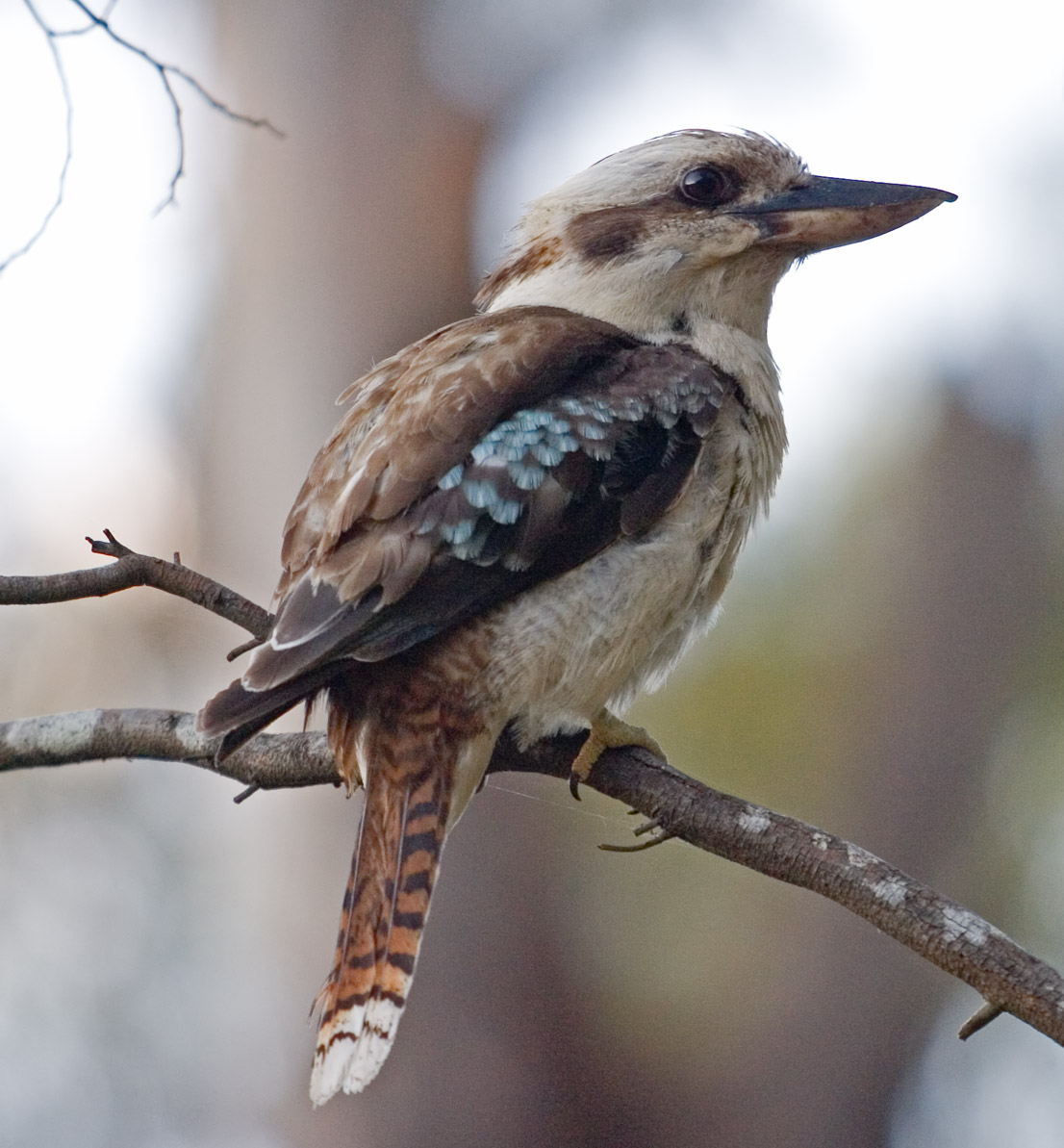
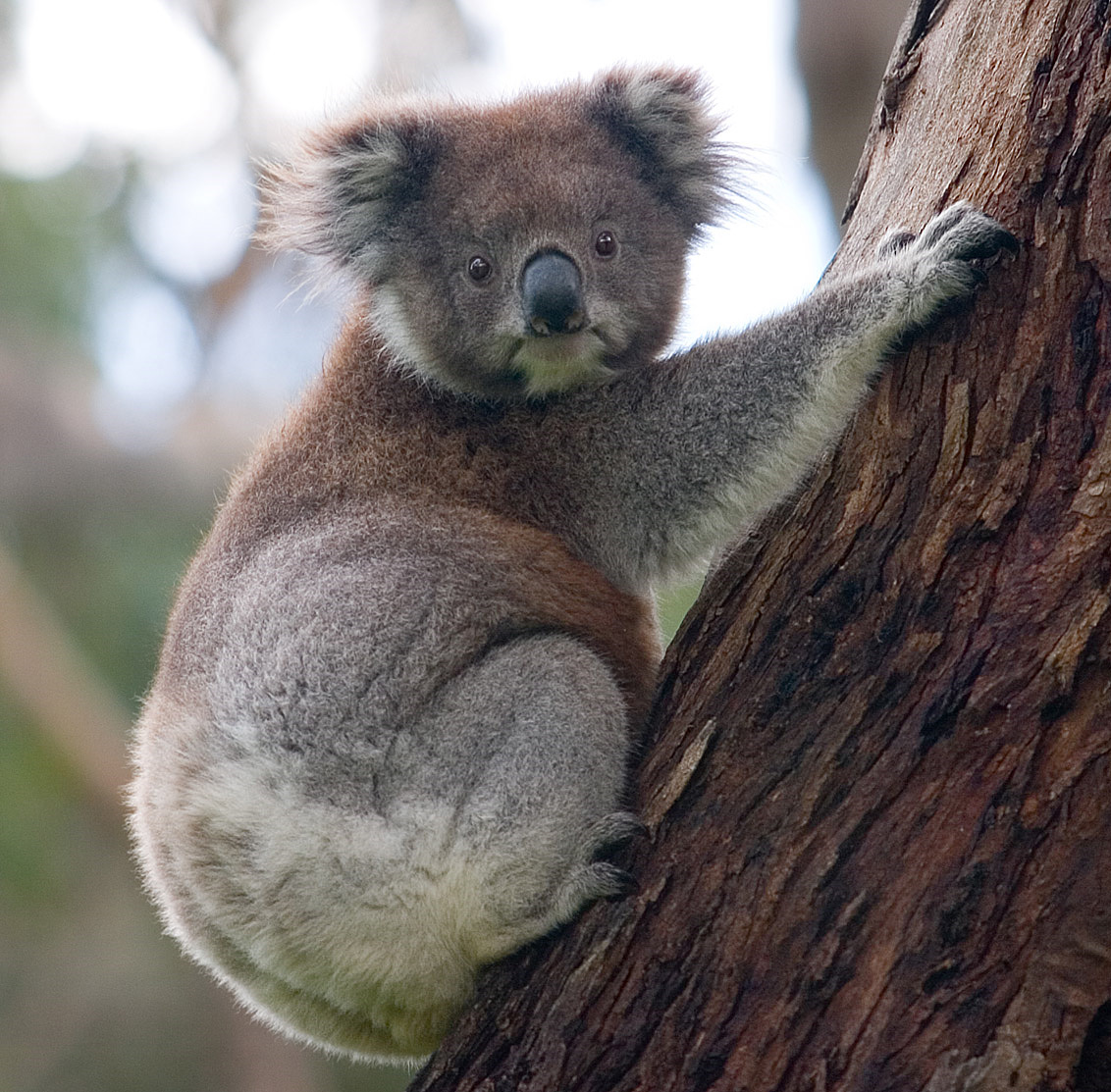
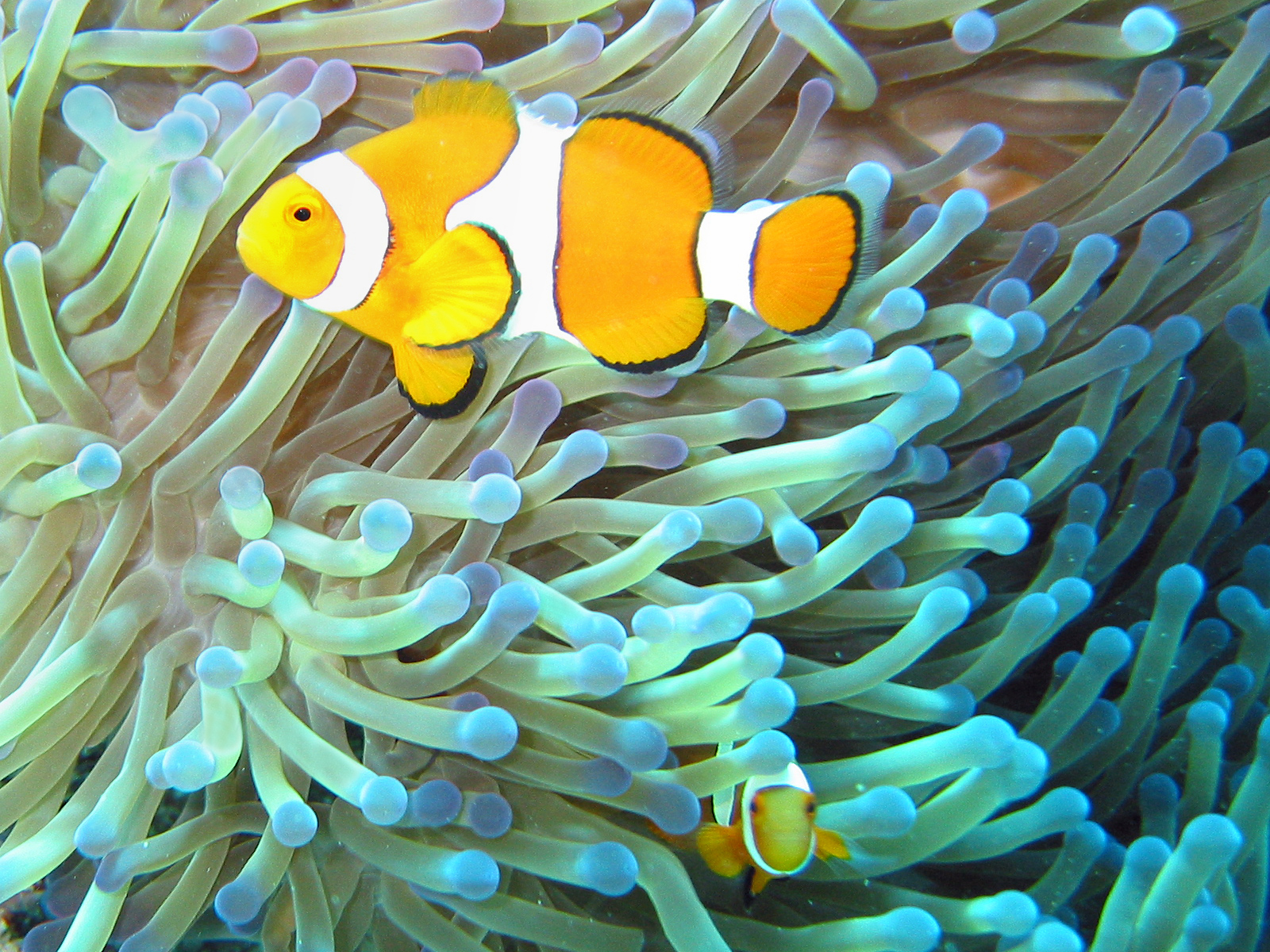
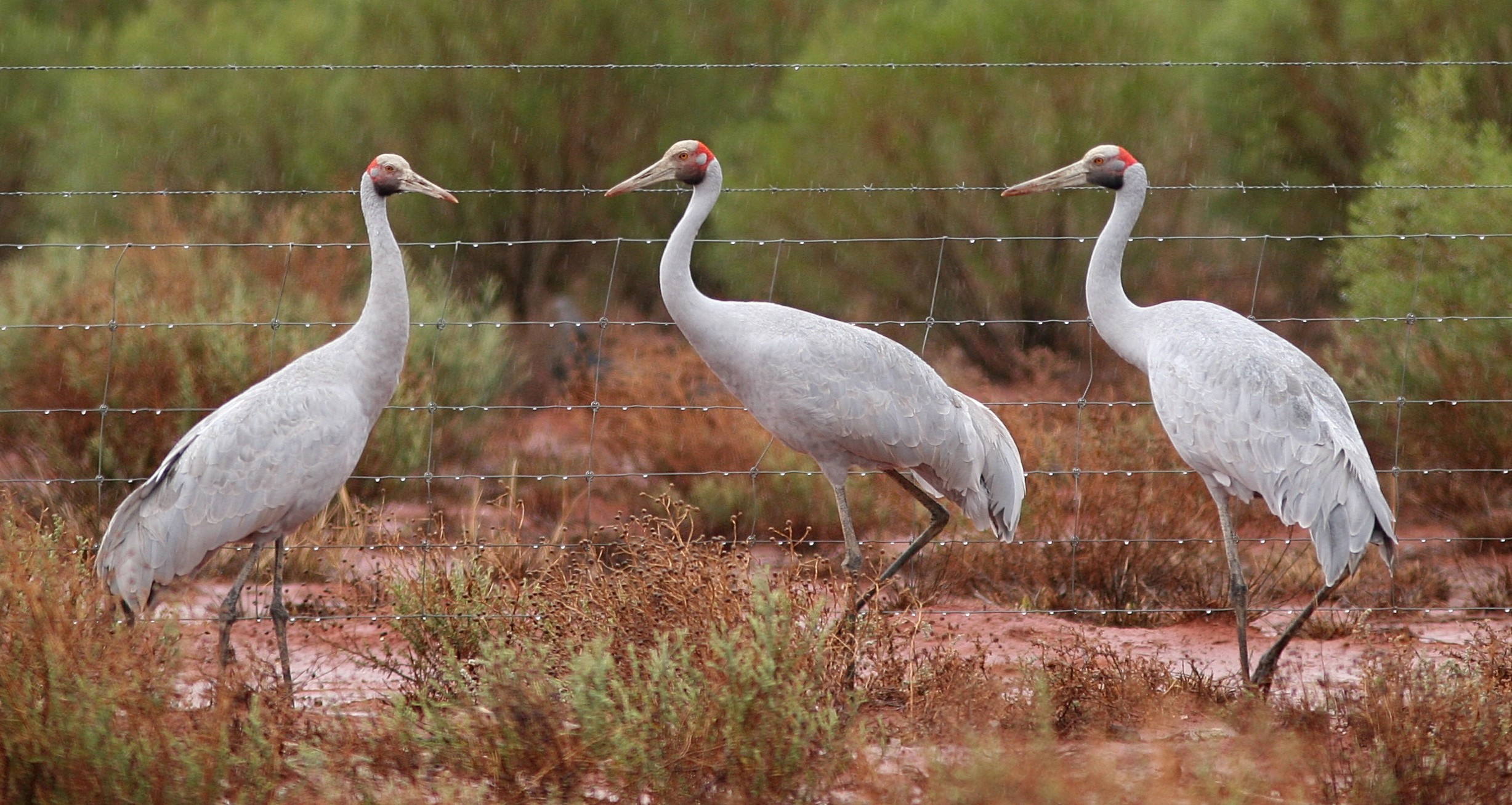
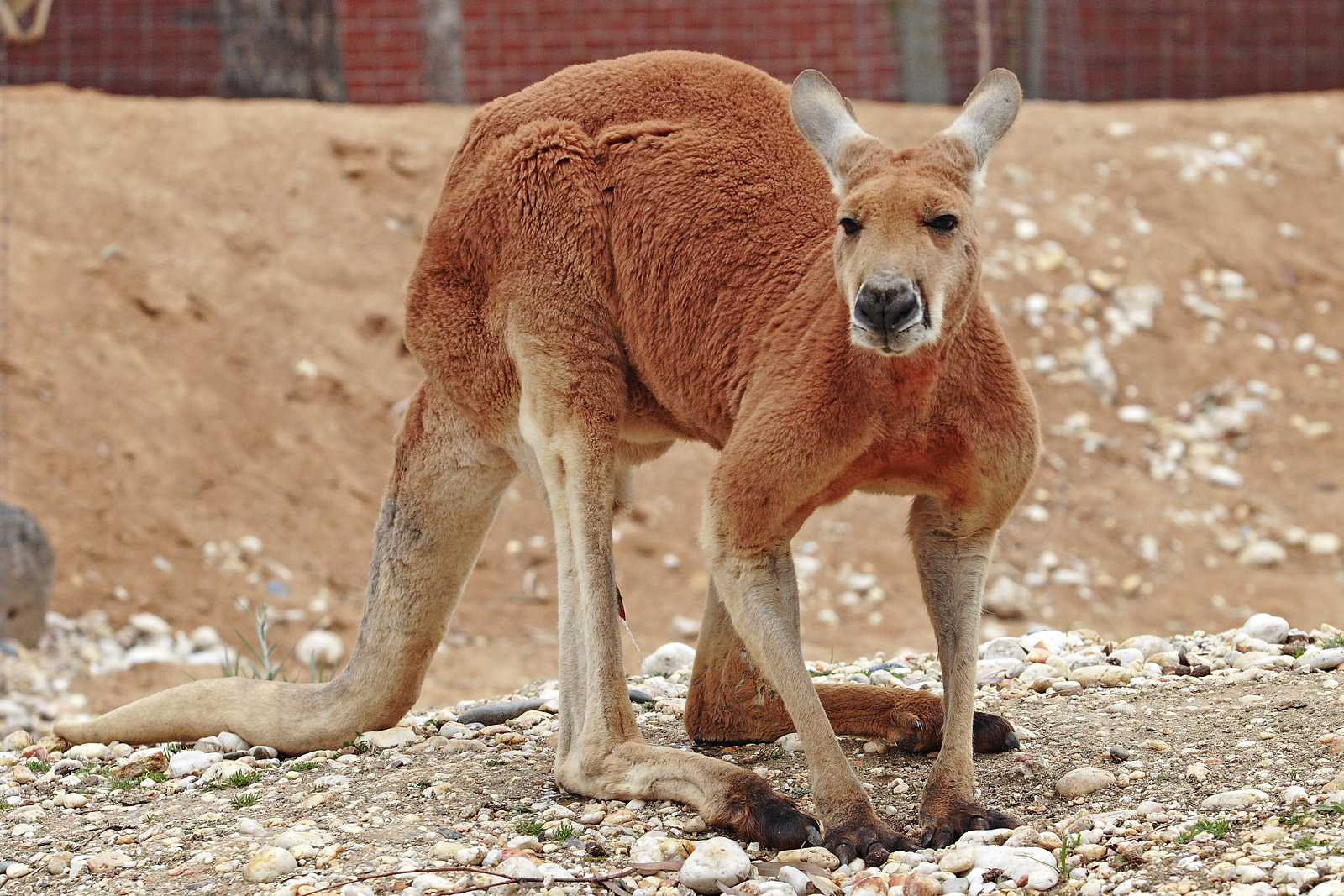
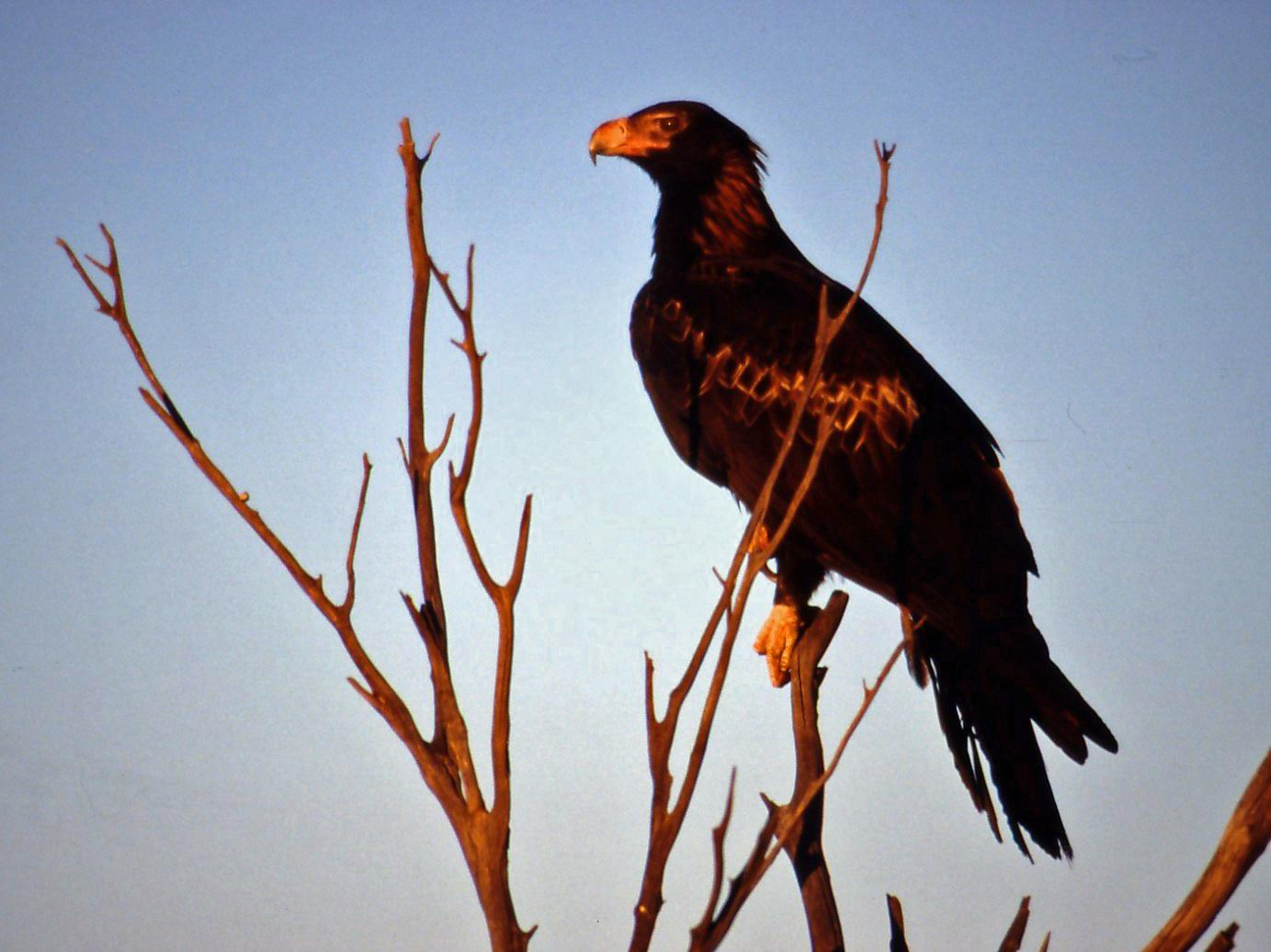
State or territory	Animal emblem	Picture
Western Australia	Numbat
Western Australia	Black swan
Western Australia	Whale shark
South Australia	Southern hairy-nosed wombat
South Australia	Leafy seadragon
South Australia	Piping shrike (unofficial)
(Victoria (state)) Victoria	Leadbeater's possum
(Victoria (state)) Victoria	Weedy seadragon
(Victoria (state)) Victoria	Helmeted honeyeater
Tasmania	Tasmanian devil
Australian Capital Territory	Gang-gang cockatoo
New South Wales	Platypus
New South Wales	Blue groper
New South Wales	Kookaburra
Queensland	Koala
Queensland	Barrier reef anemonefish (clown fish)
Queensland	Brolga
Northern Territory	Red kangaroo
Northern Territory	Wedge-tailed eagle

=== Canada ===
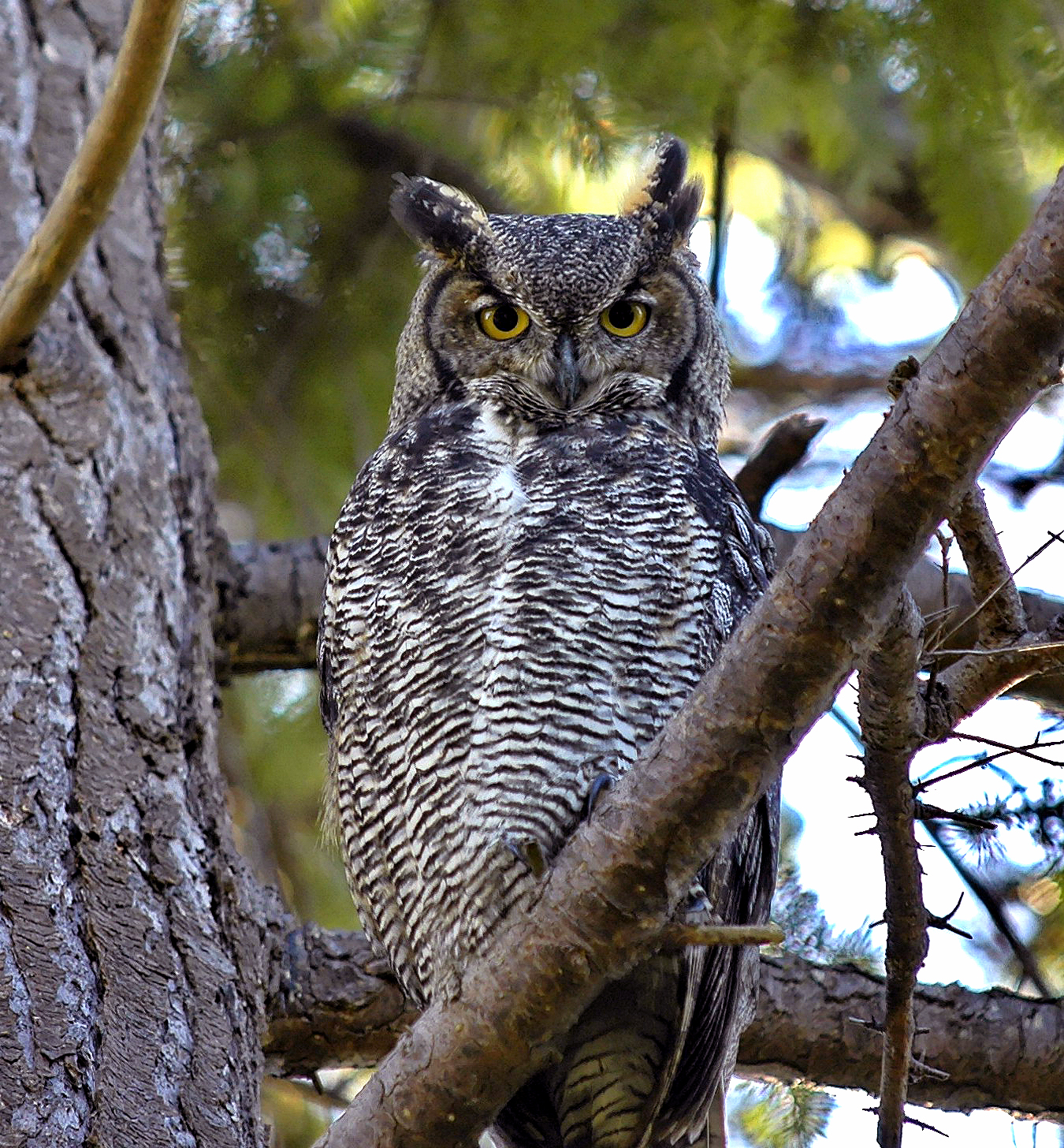
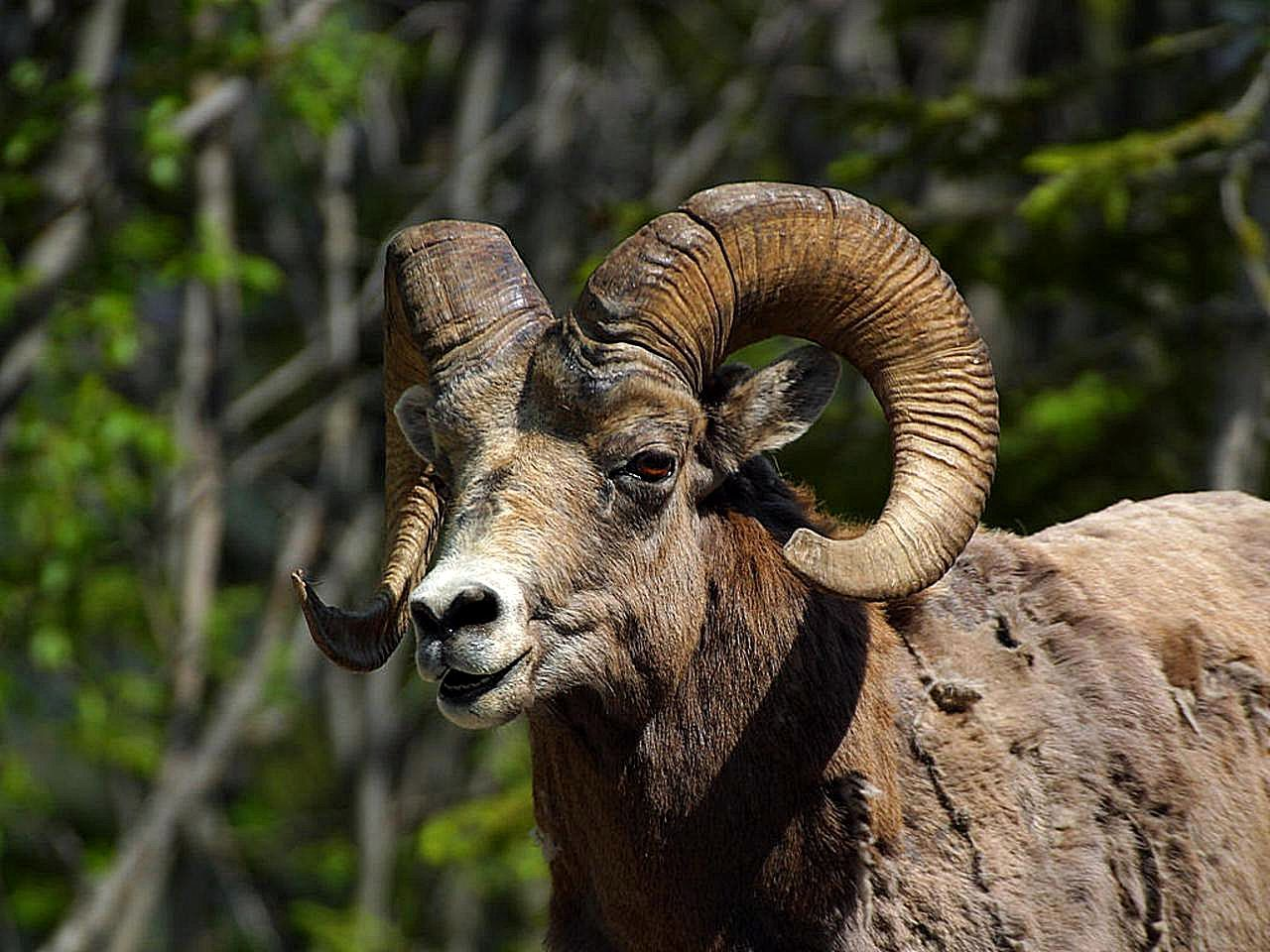
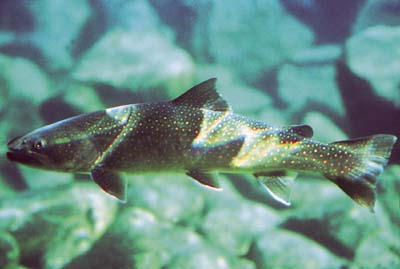
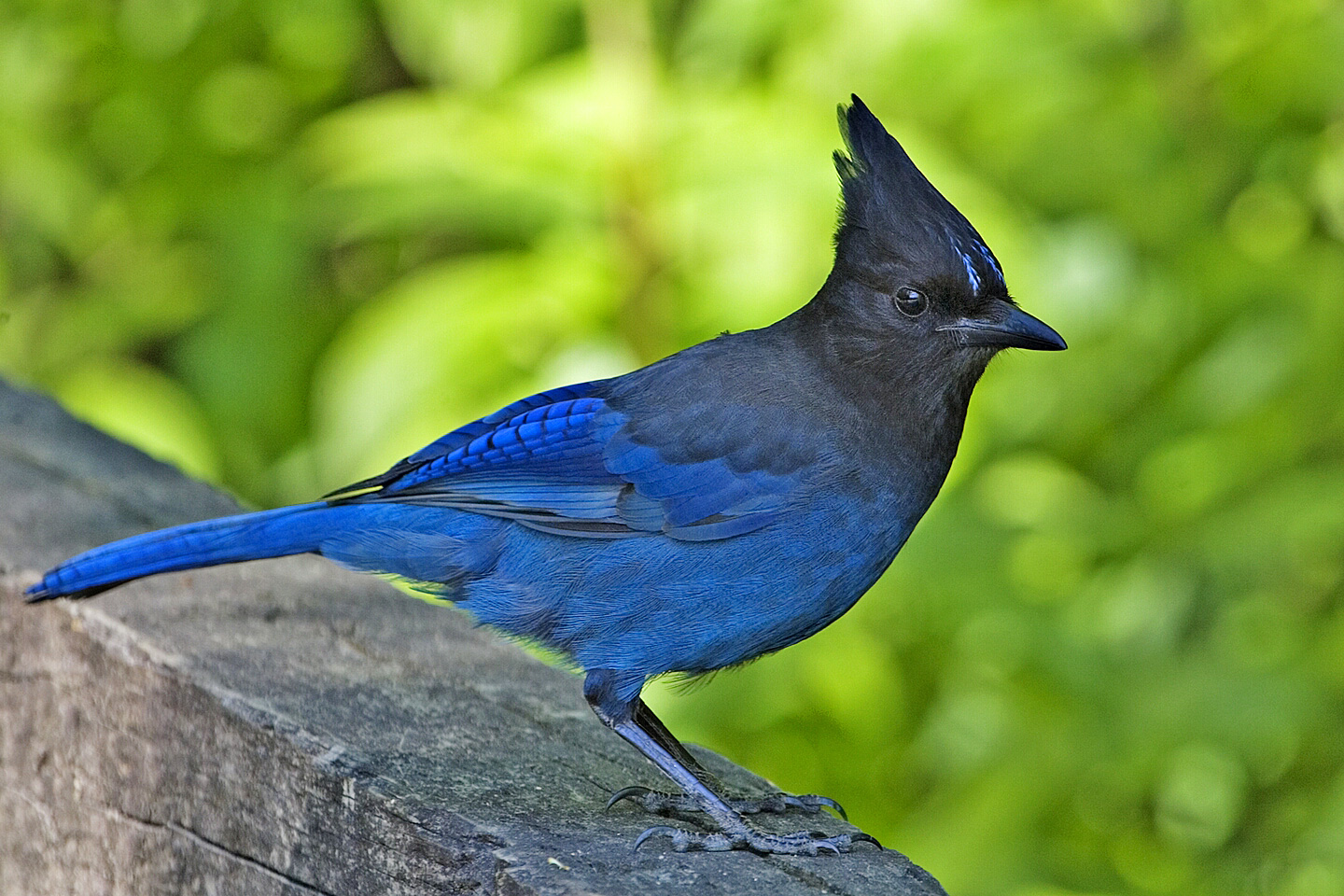
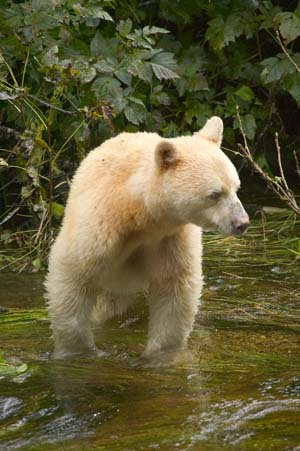
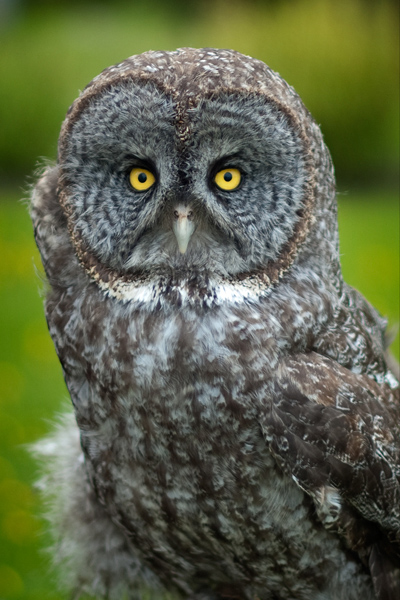
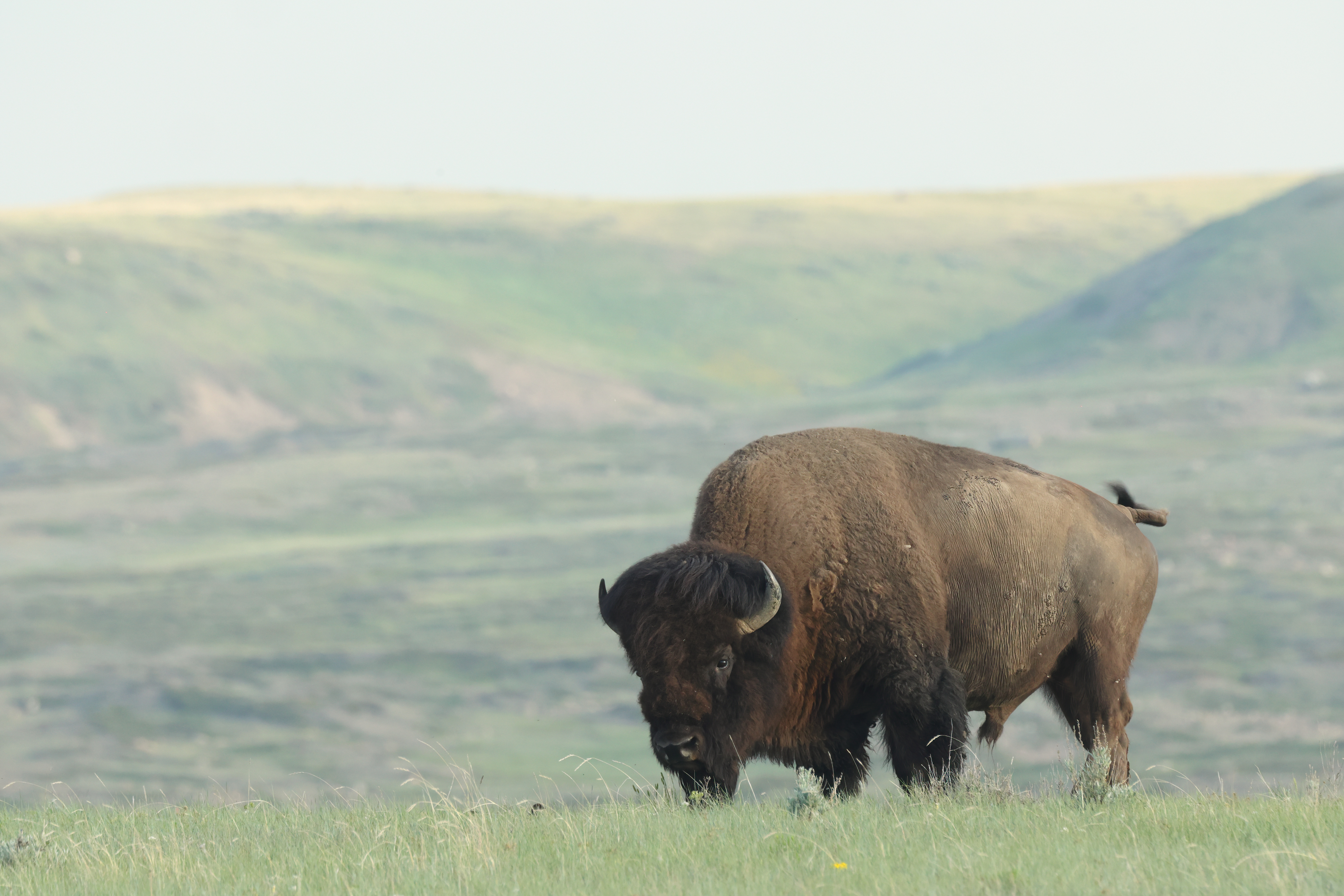
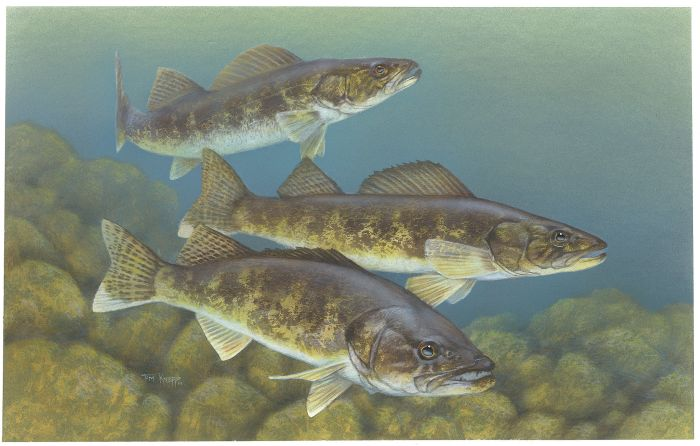
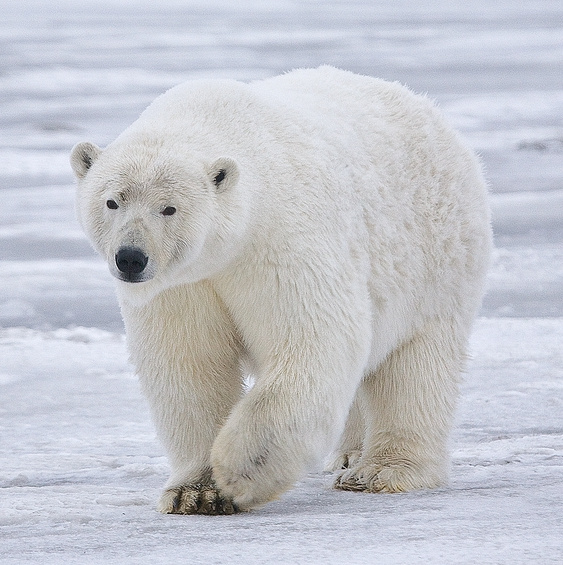
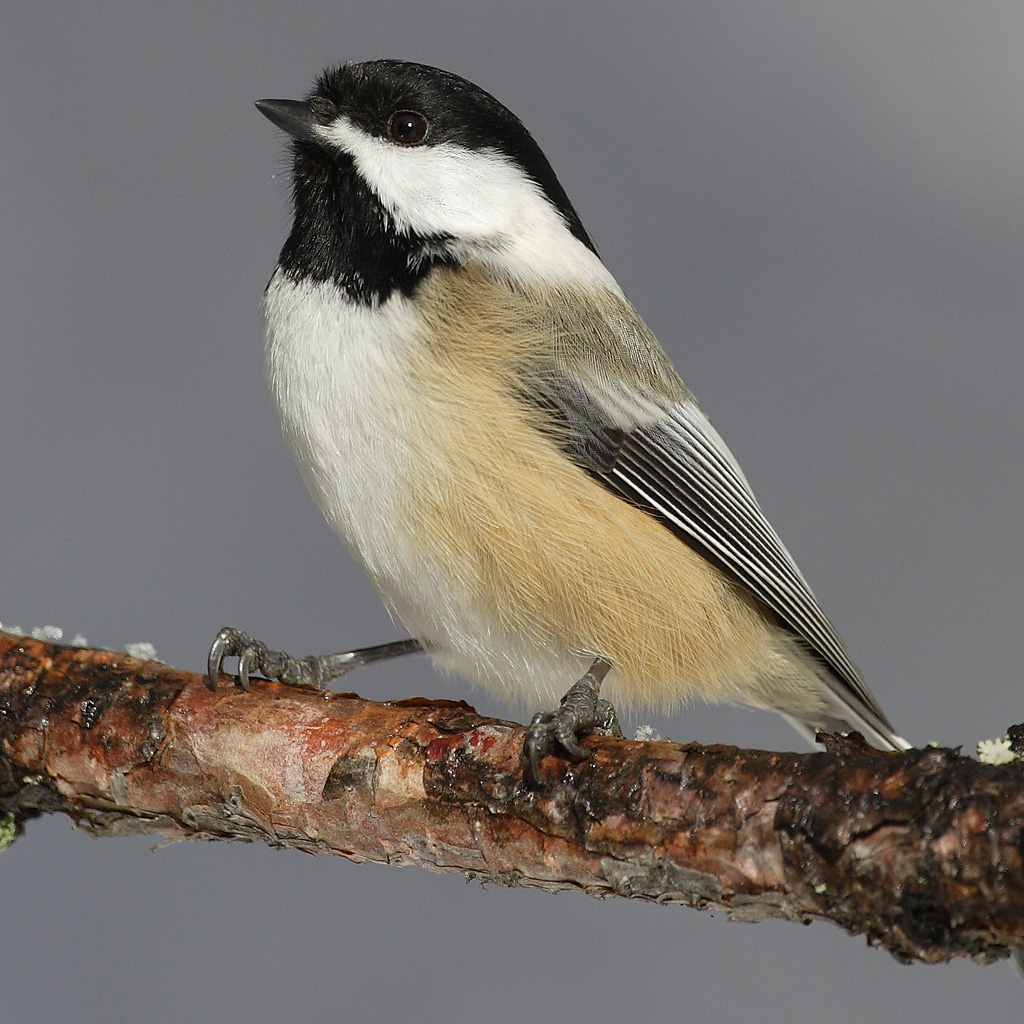
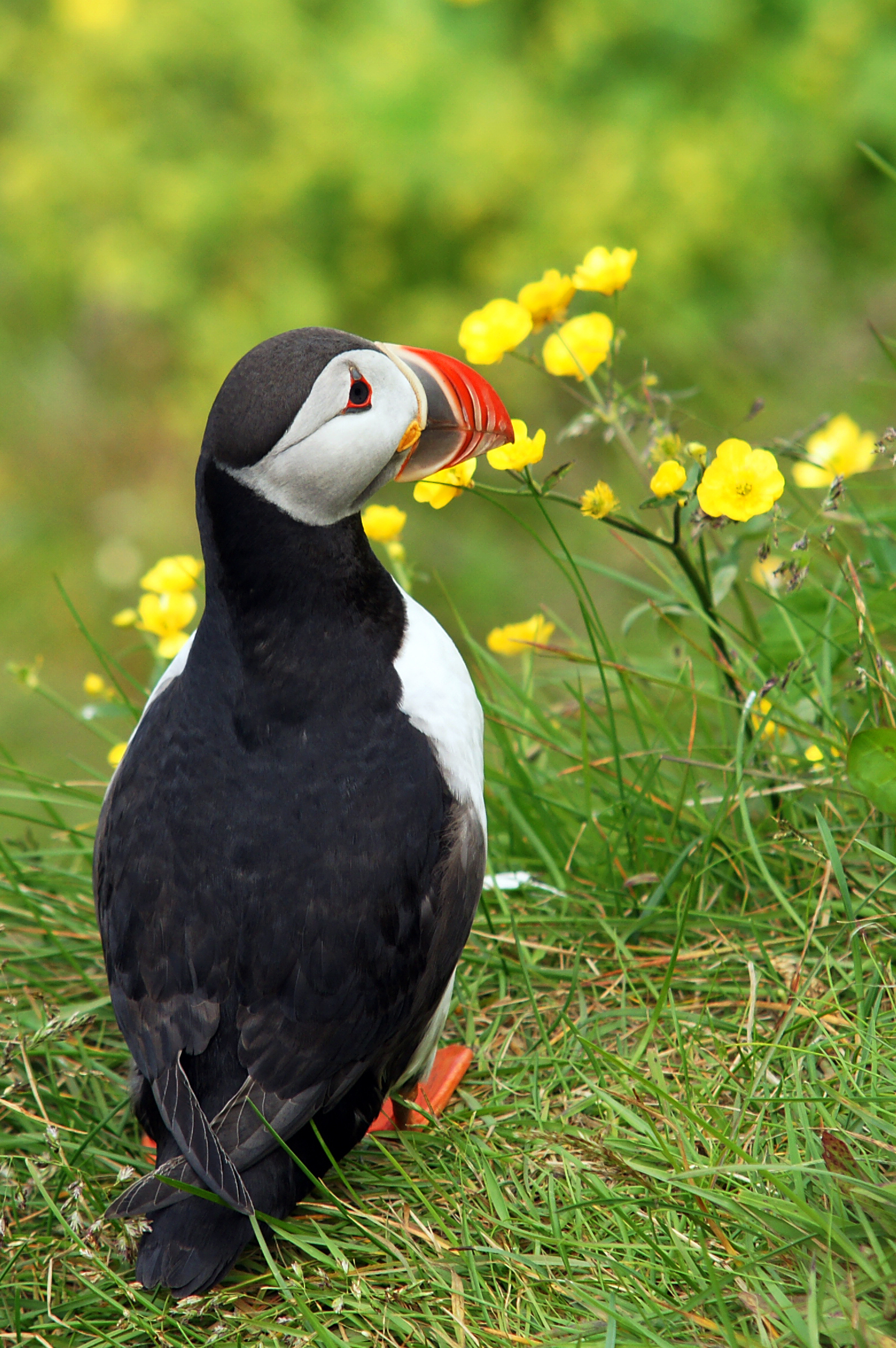
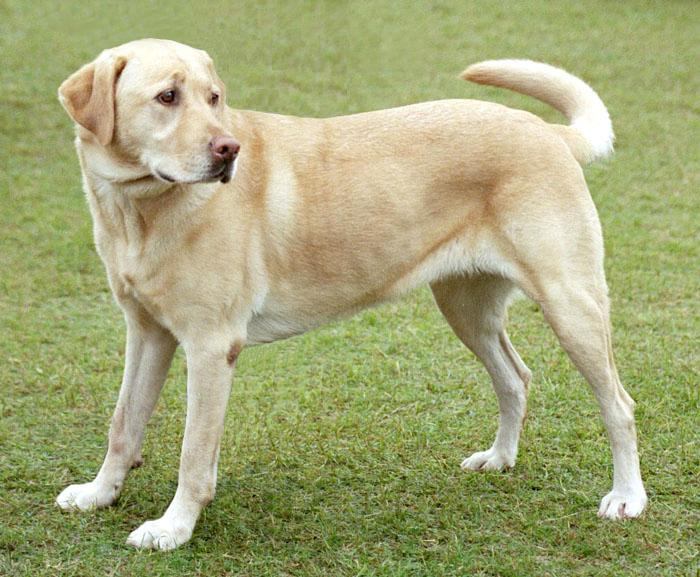
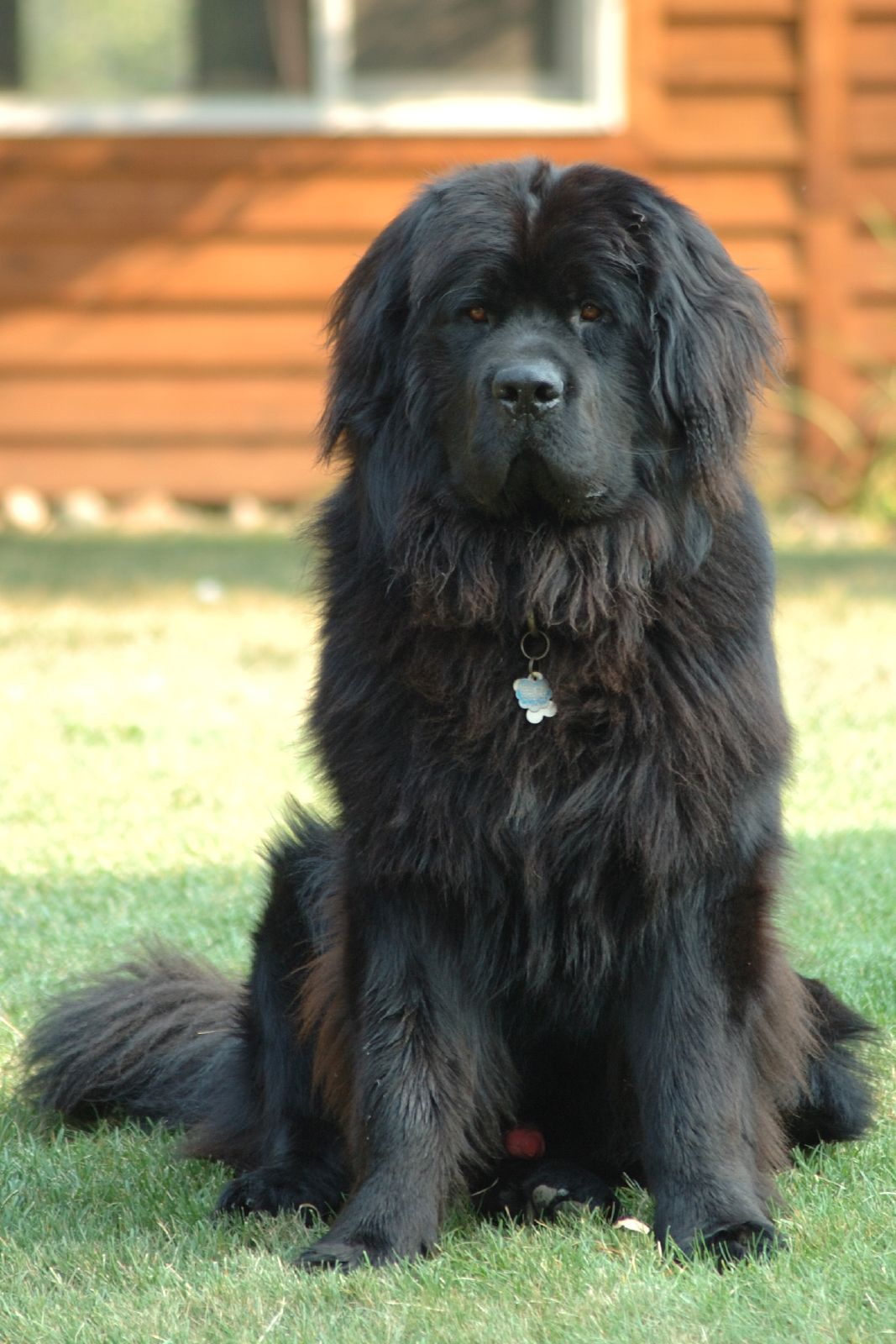
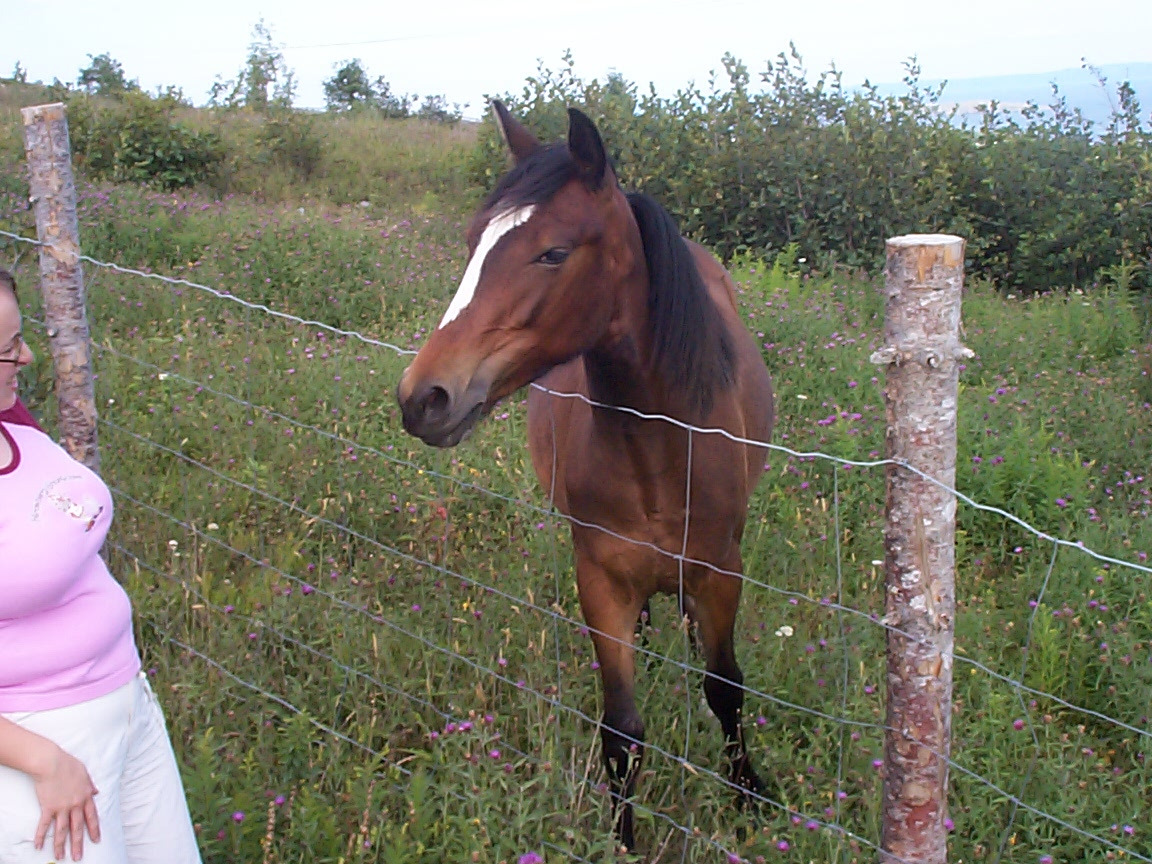
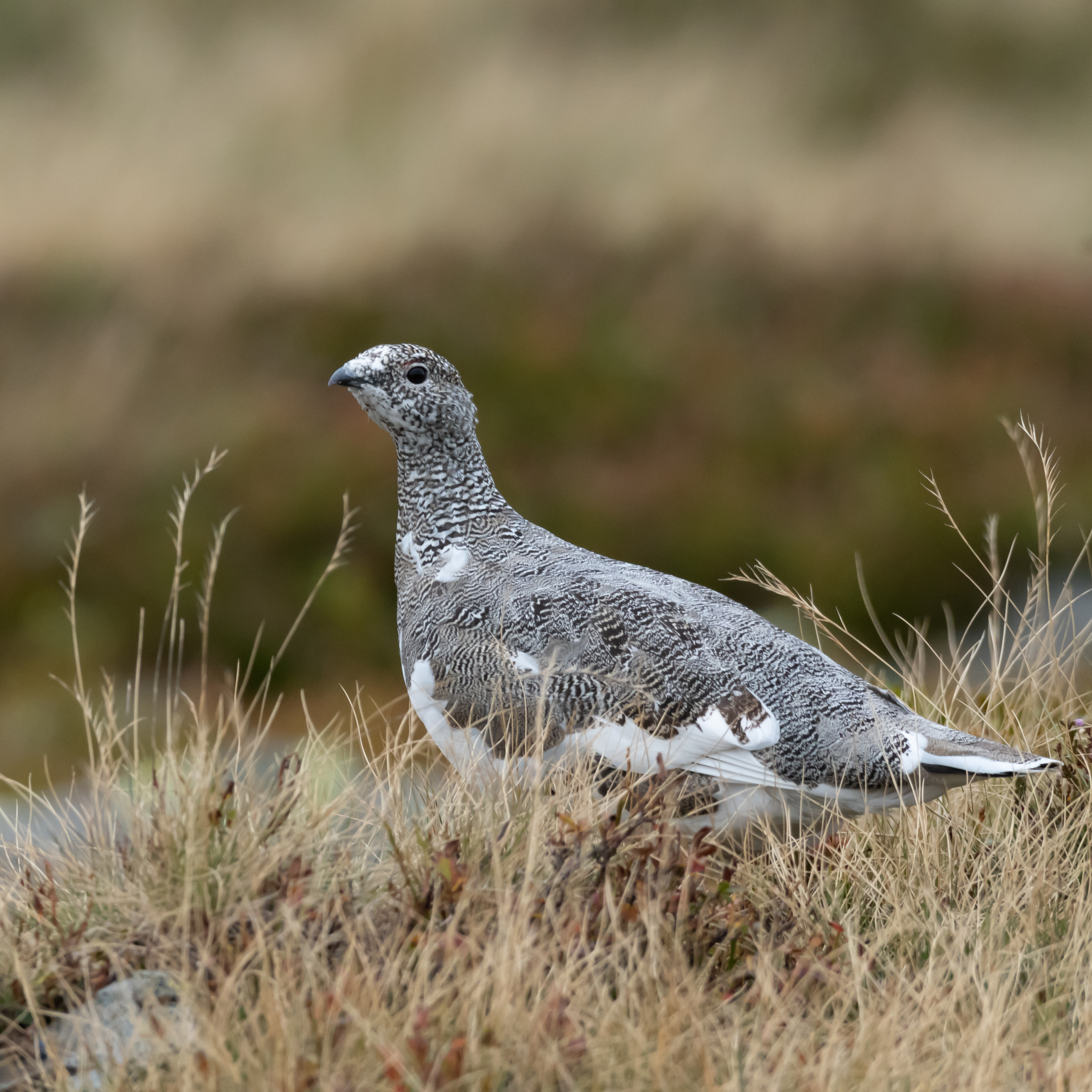
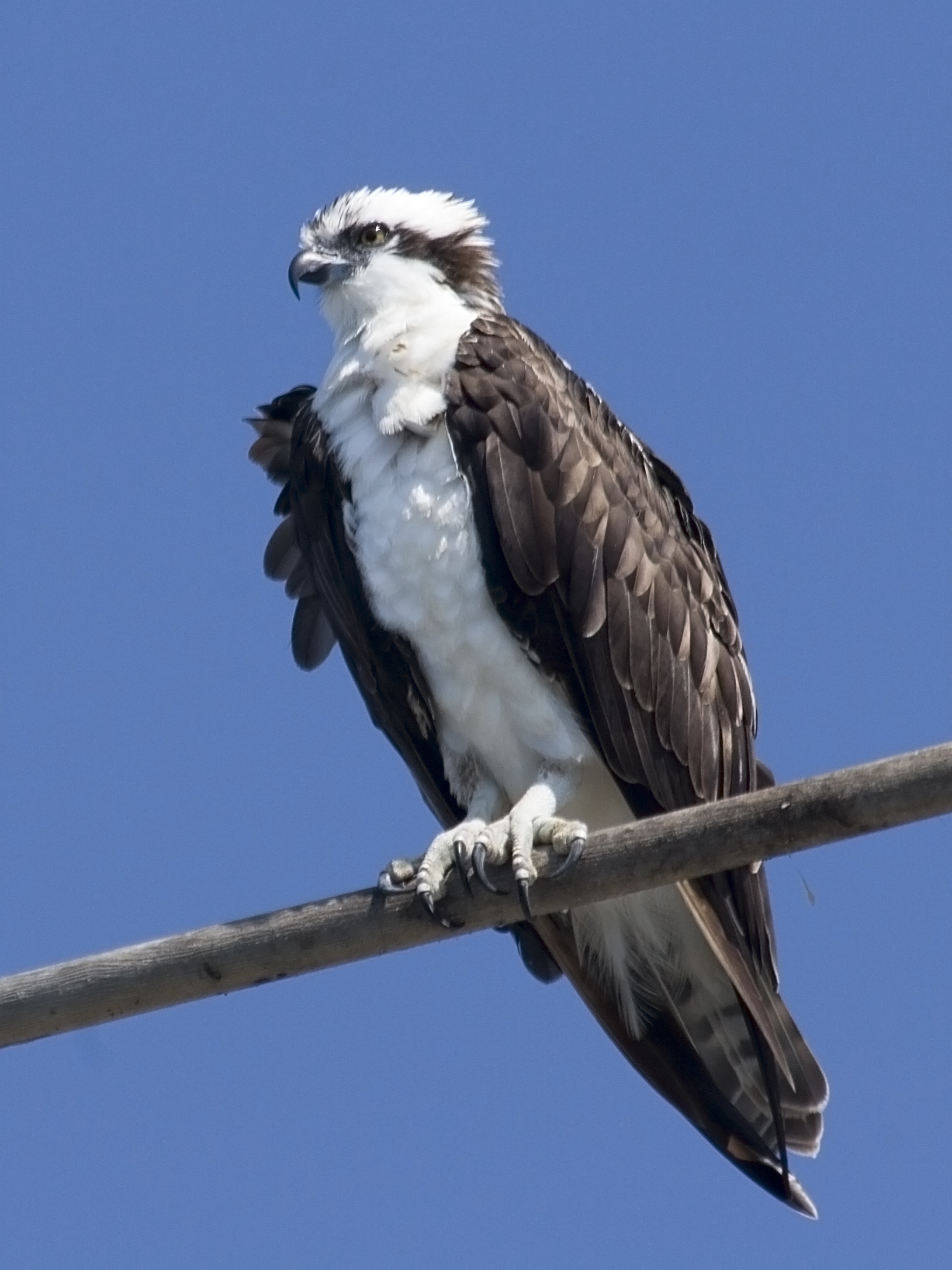
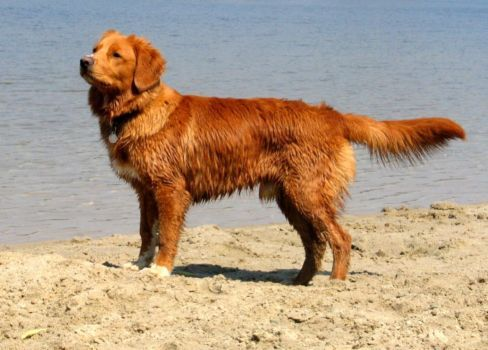
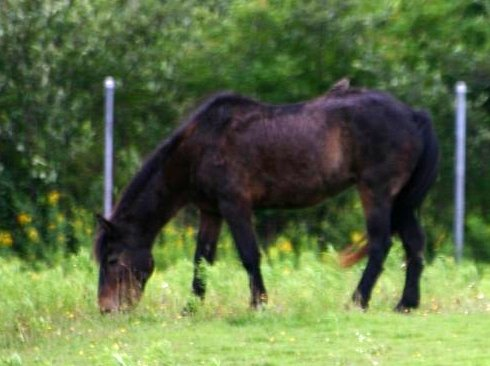
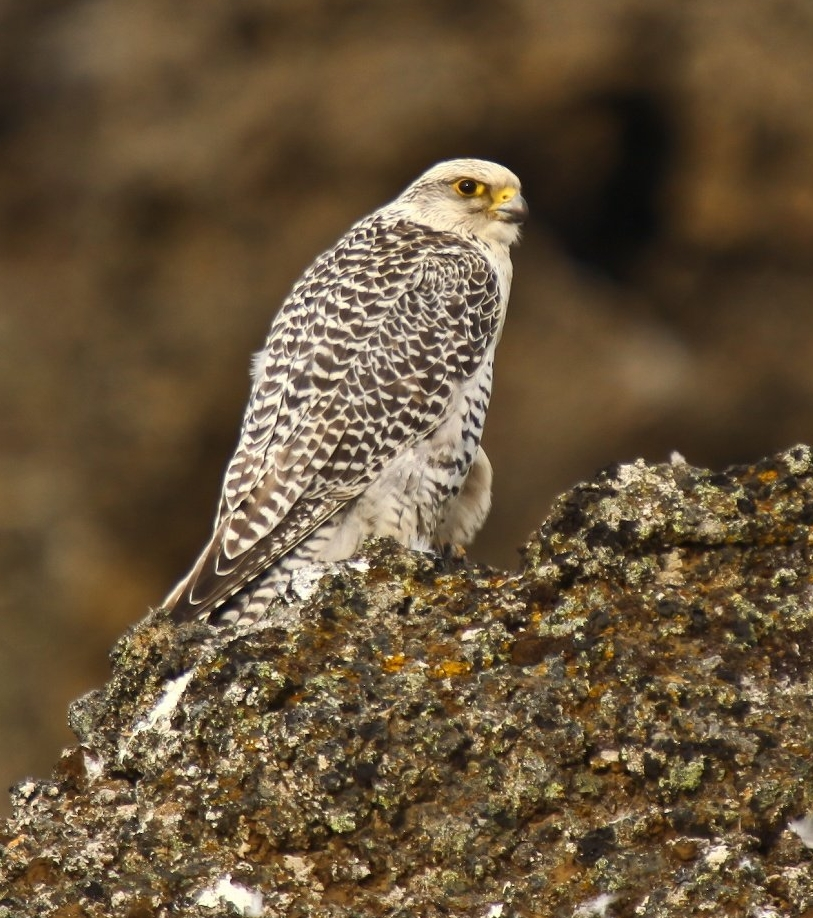
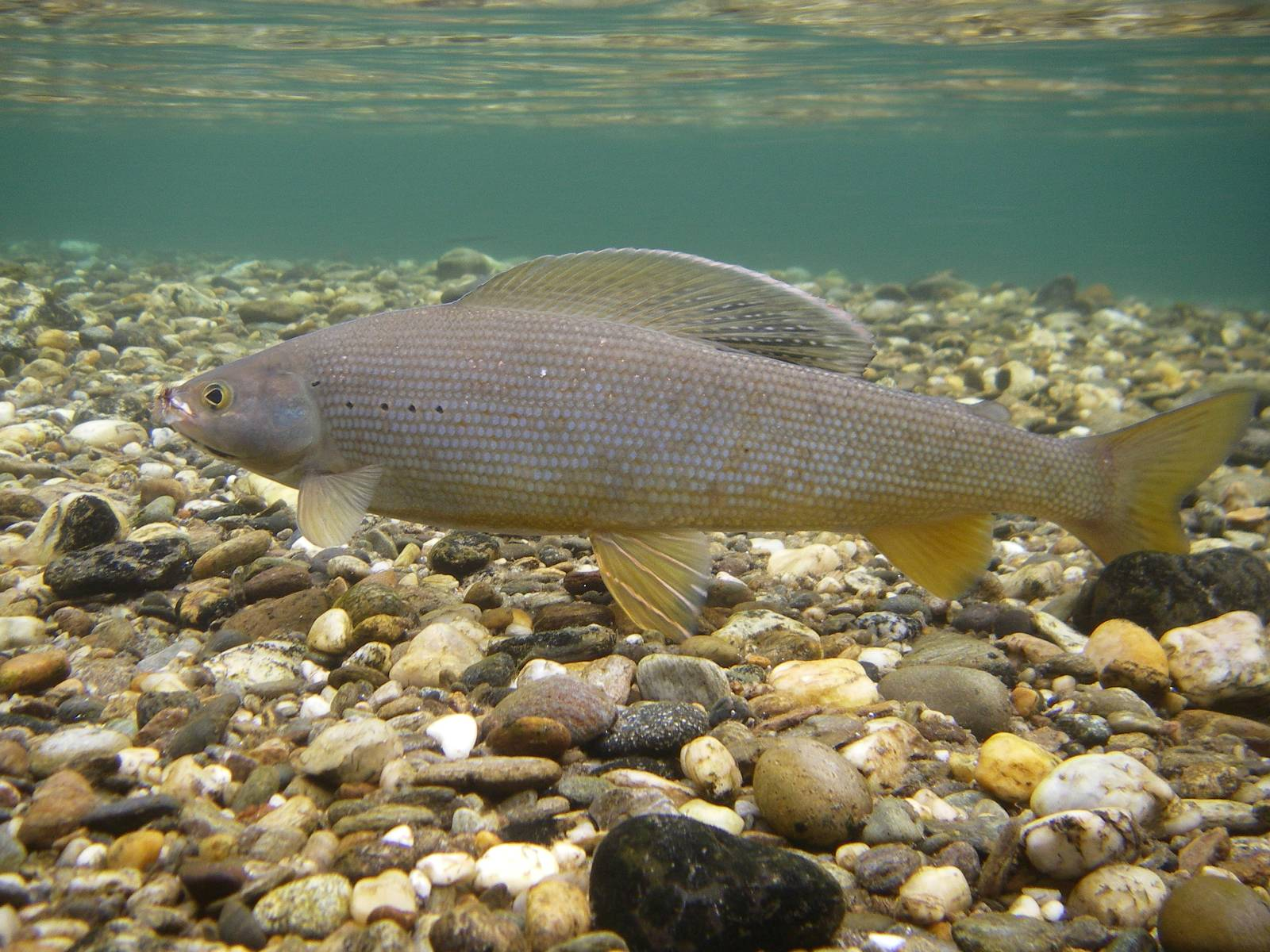
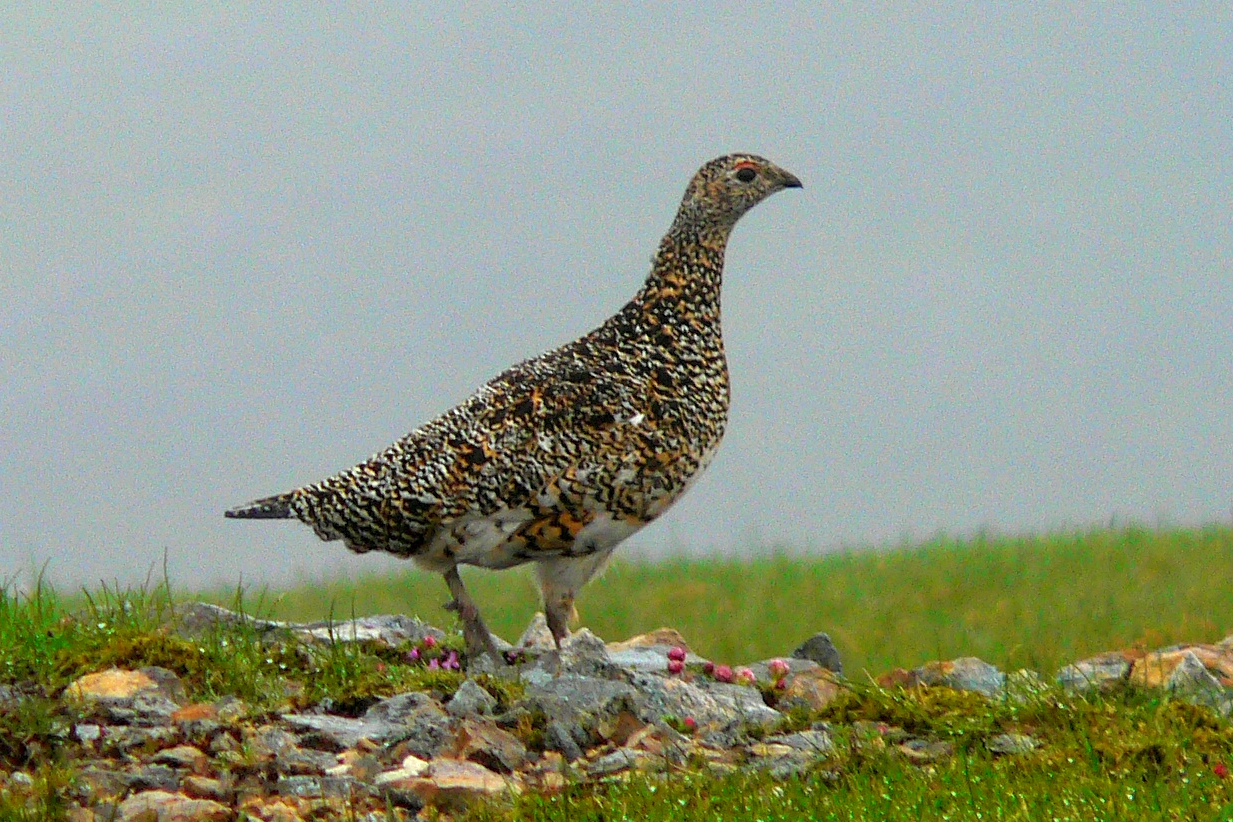
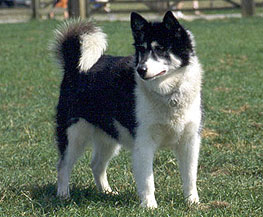
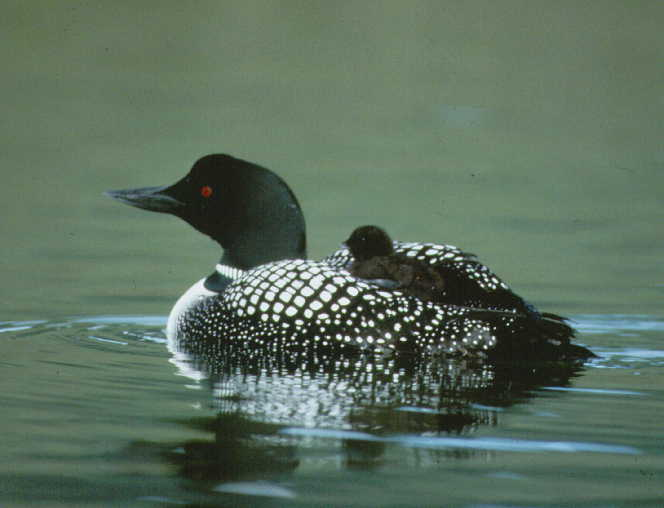
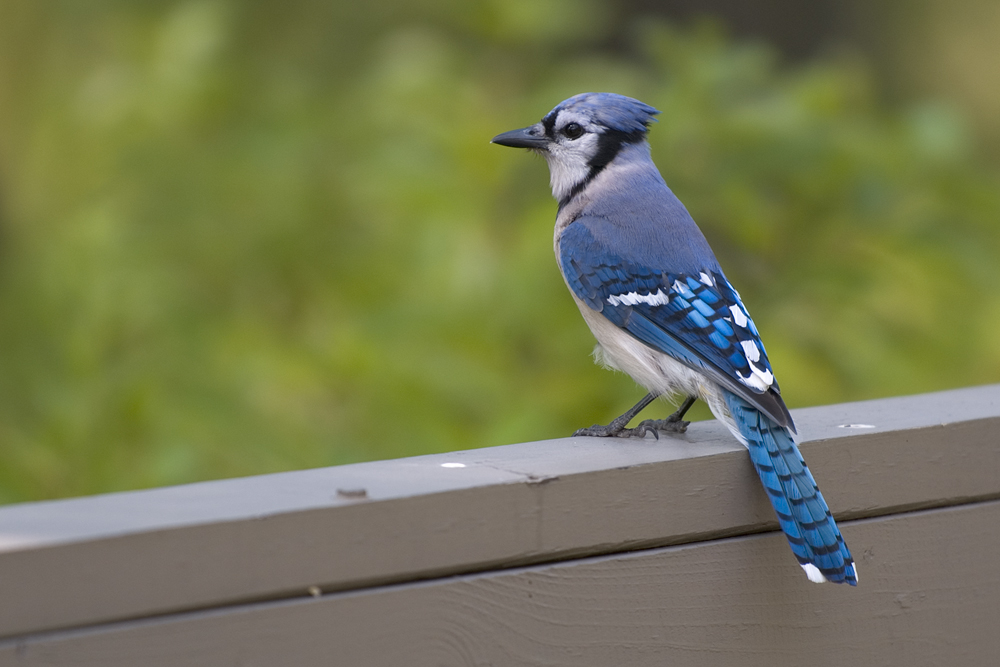
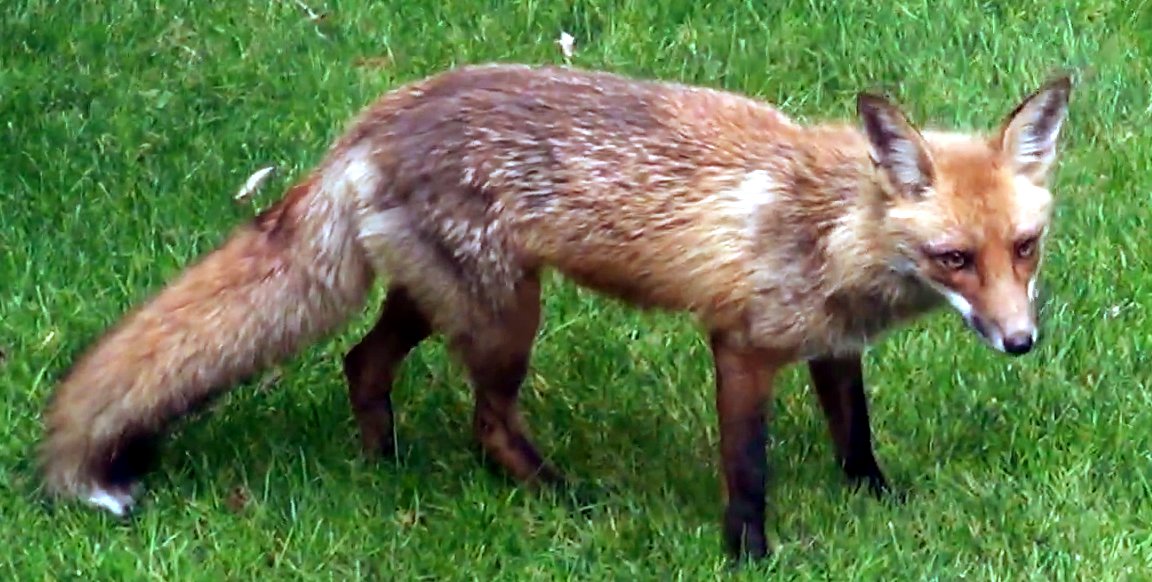
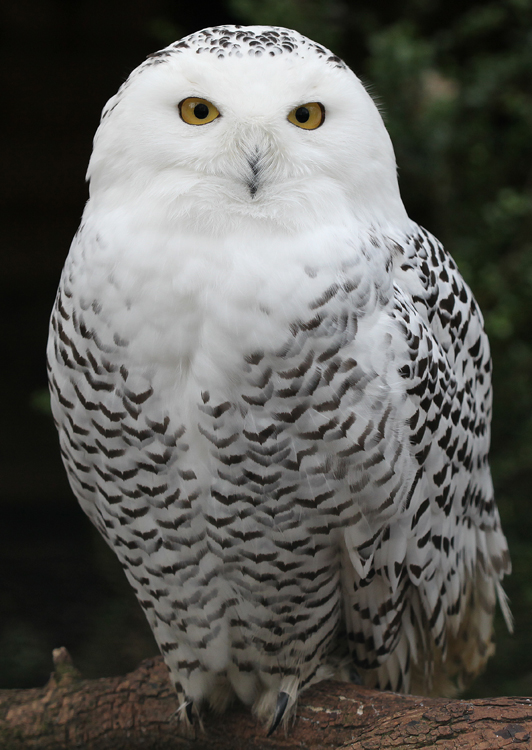
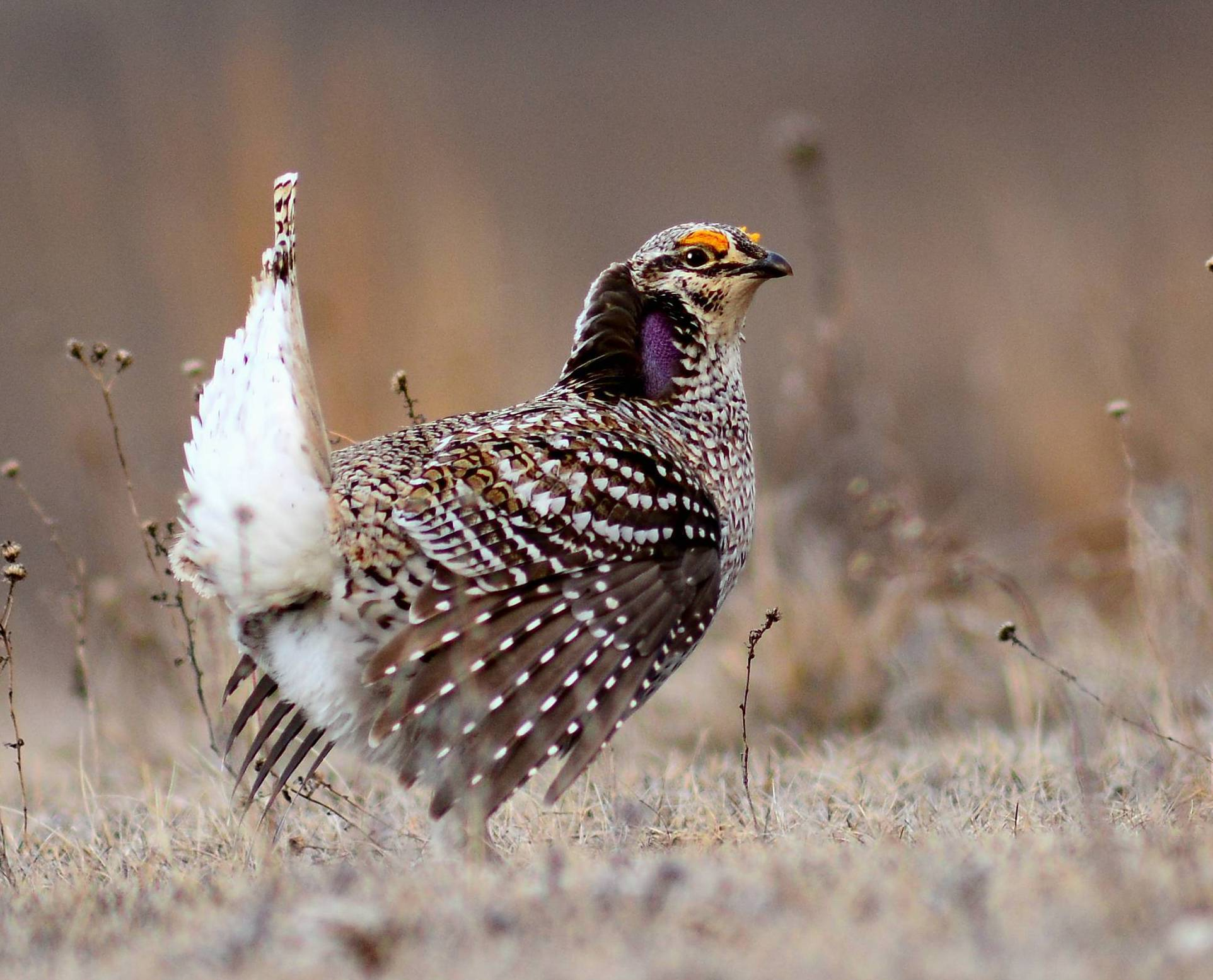
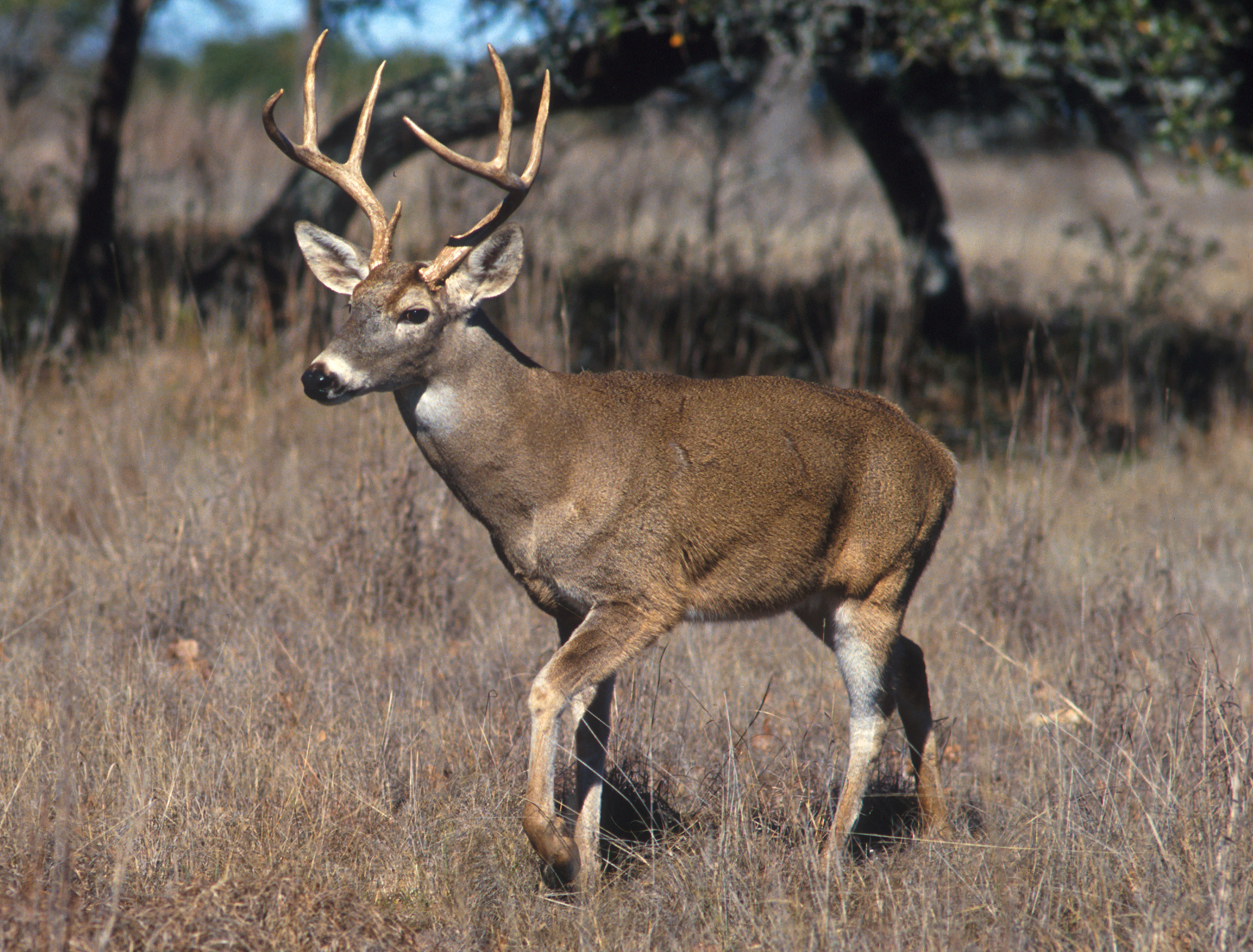
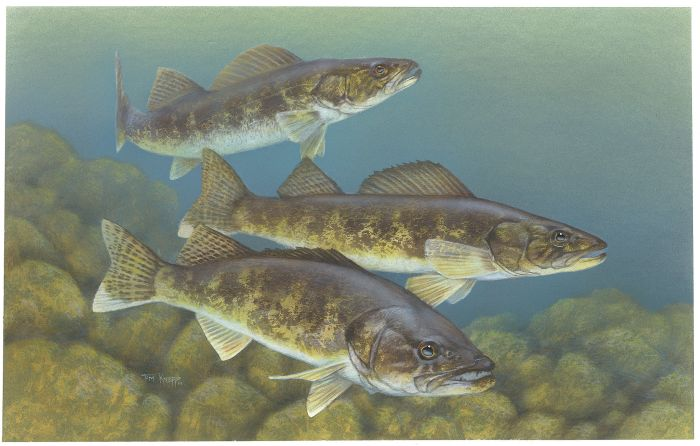
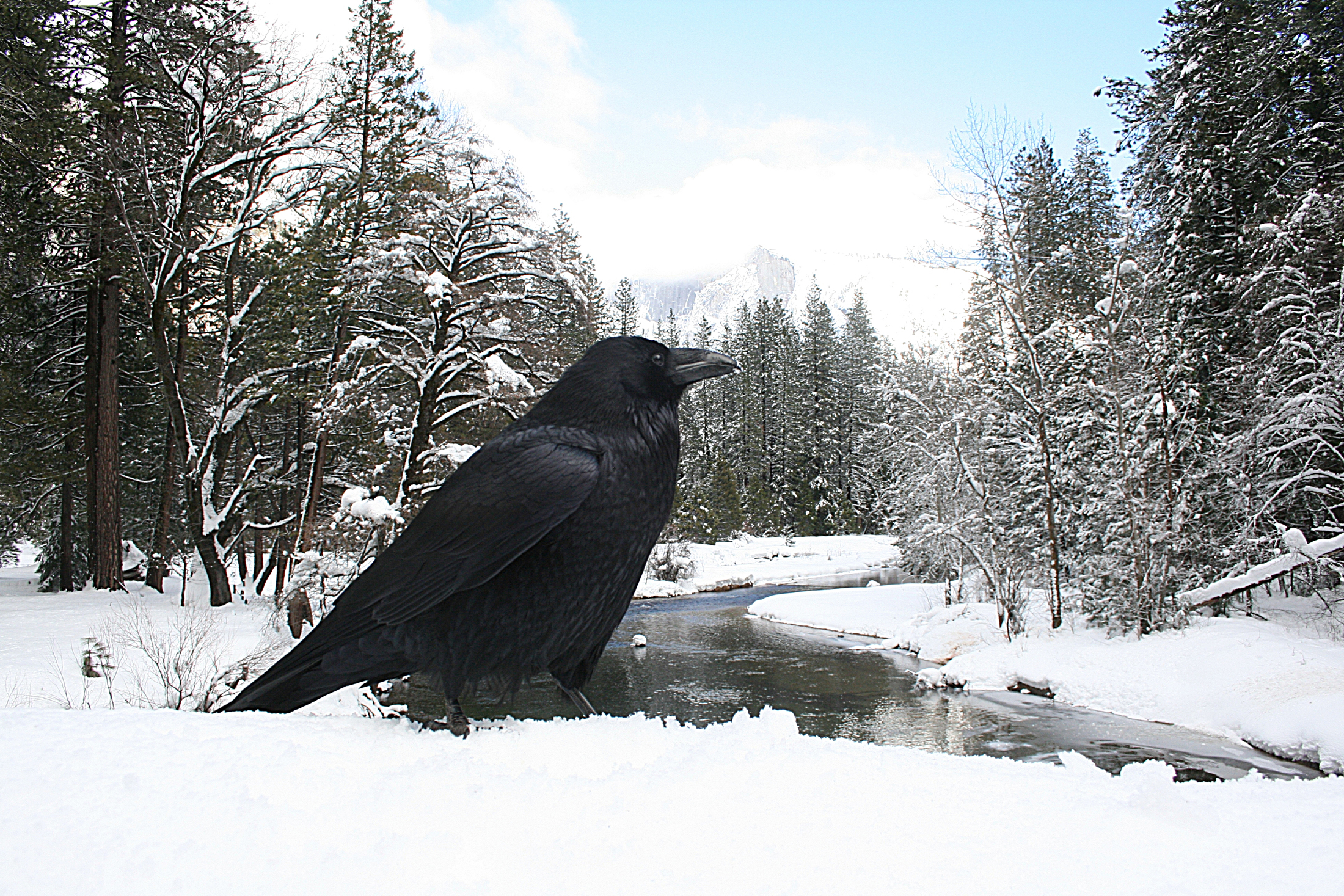
Province/territory	Animal	Picture
Alberta	Great horned owl
Rocky Mountain bighorn sheep
Bull trout
British Columbia	Steller's jay
Spirit bear
Manitoba	Great grey owl
North American plains bison
Pickerel (Sander vitreus)
Polar bear
New Brunswick	Black-capped chickadee
Newfoundland and Labrador	Atlantic puffin
Labrador Retriever
Newfoundland
Newfoundland pony
Partridge (provincial game bird)
Nova Scotia	Osprey
Nova Scotia Duck-Tolling Retriever (provincial dog)
Sable Island horse (provincial horse)
Northwest Territories	Gyrfalcon
Arctic grayling
Nunavut	Rock ptarmigan (Aqilgiq, ᐊᕐᑭᒡᒋᖅ ᐊᑕᔪᓕᒃ) Lagopus mutus
Canadian Inuit Dog (Qimmiq, ᕿᒻᒥᖅ) Canis Familiaris Borealis
Ontario	Common loon
Prince Edward Island	Blue jay
Red fox
Québec	Snowy owl
Saskatchewan	Sharp-tailed grouse
White-tailed deer (Odocoileus virginianus)
Walleye (Sander vitreus)
Yukon	Common raven

=== People's Republic of China ===
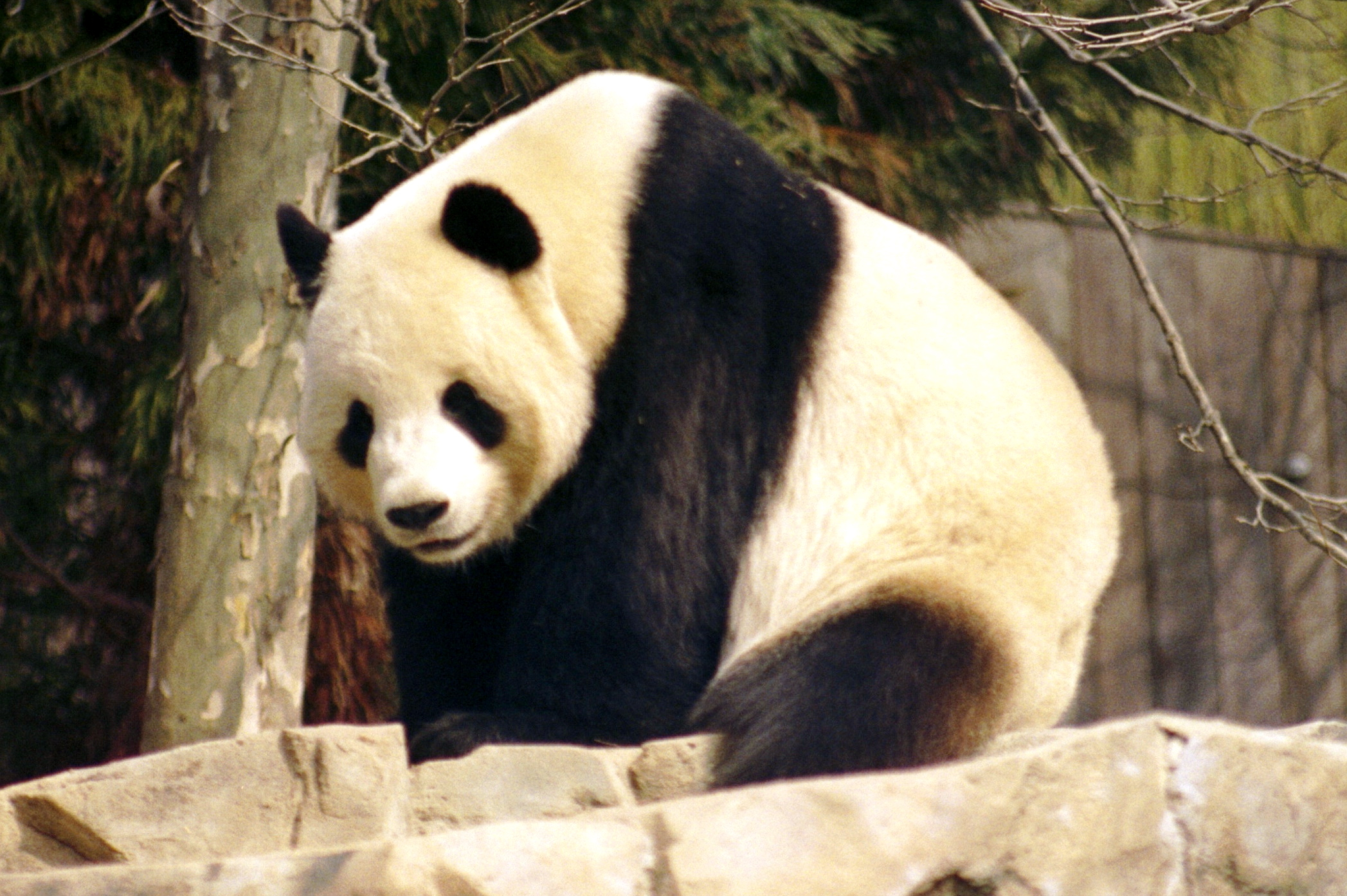
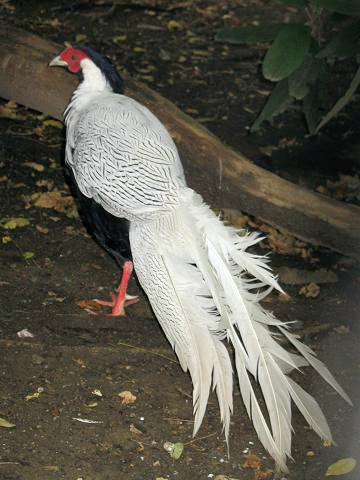
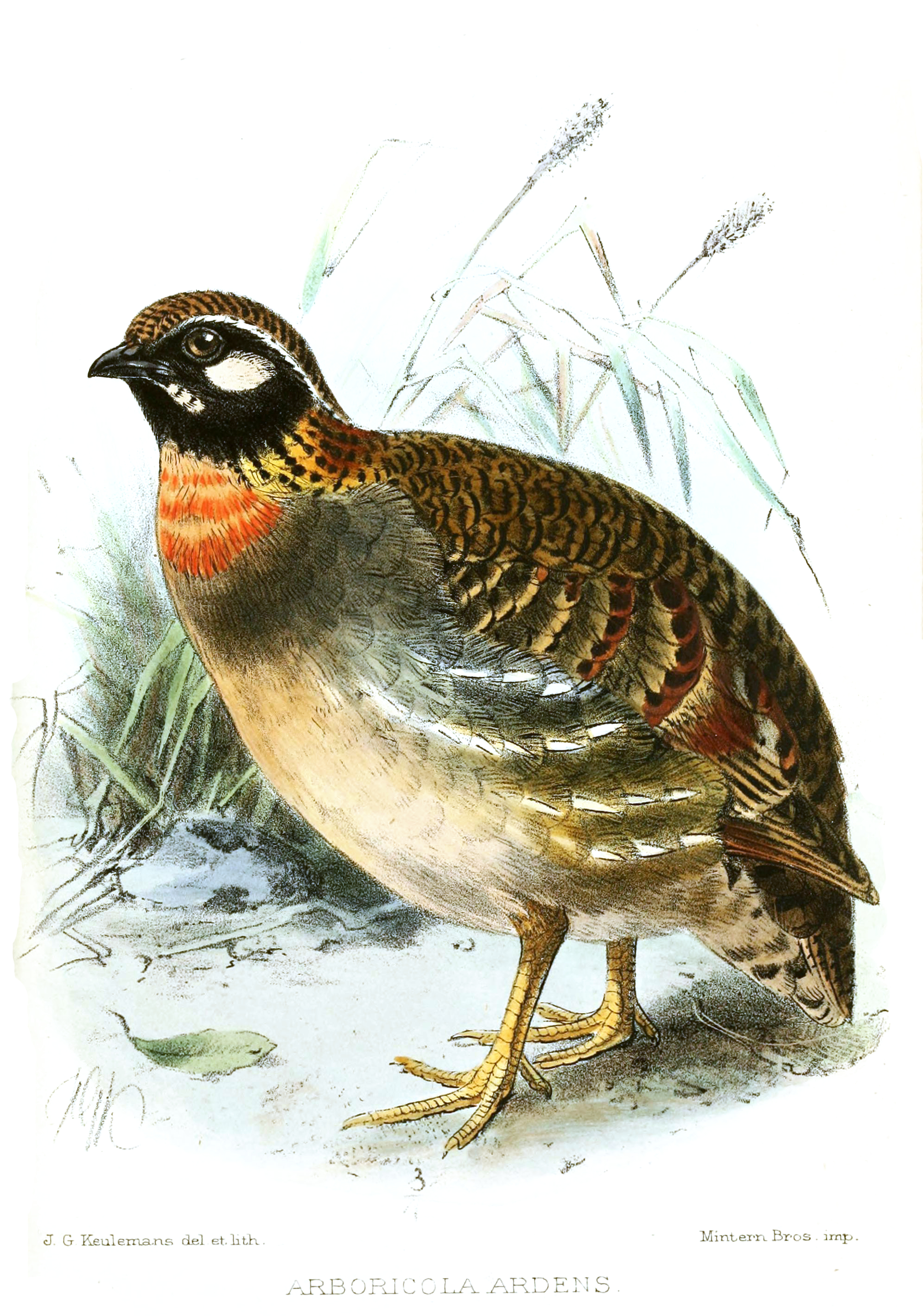
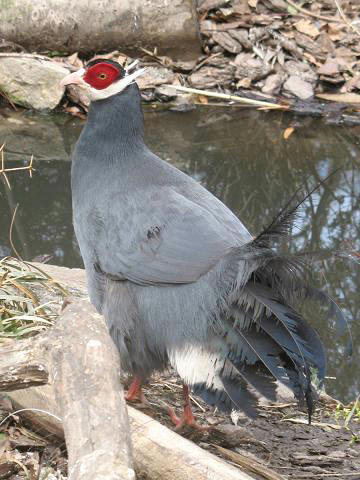
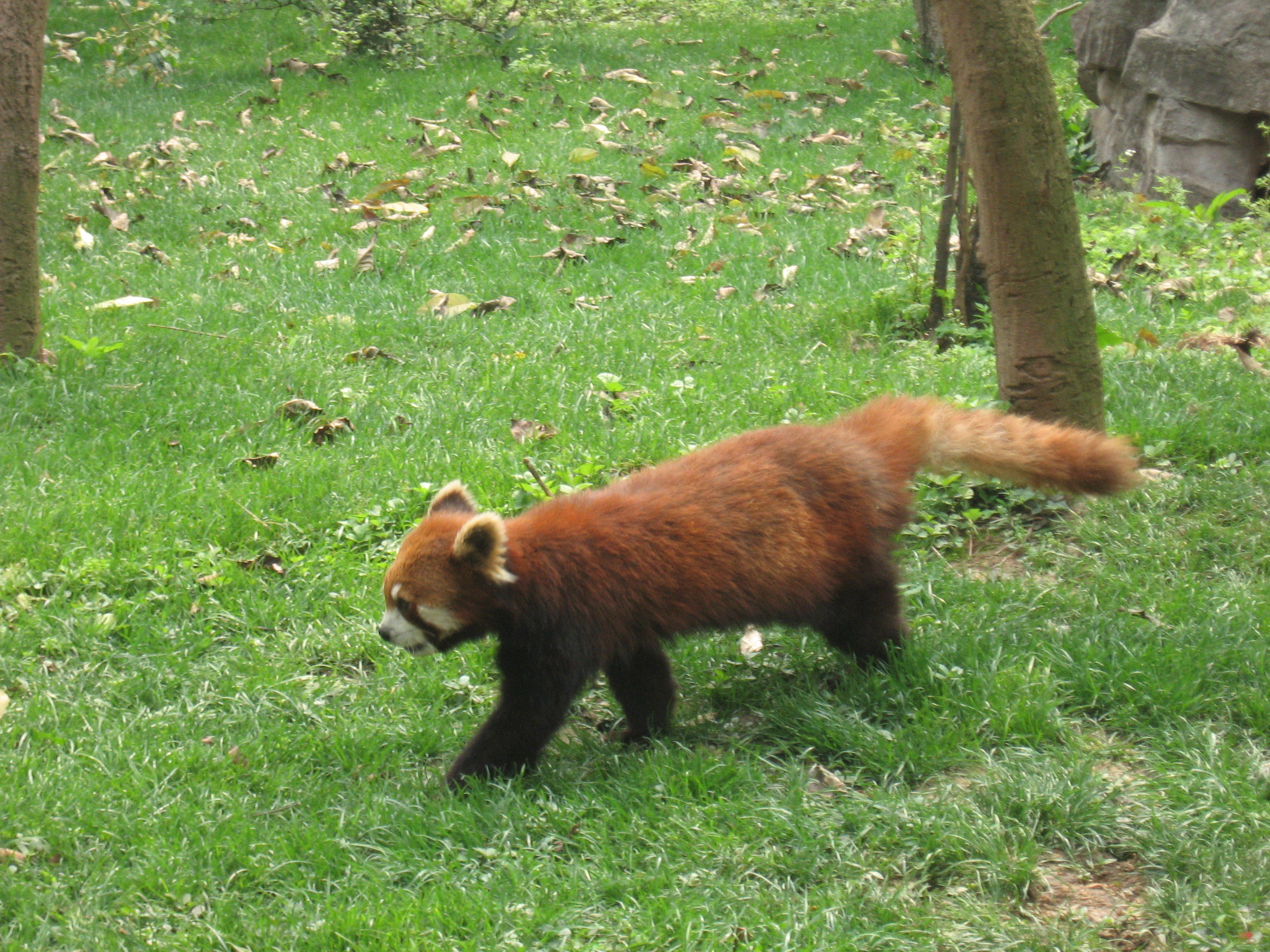
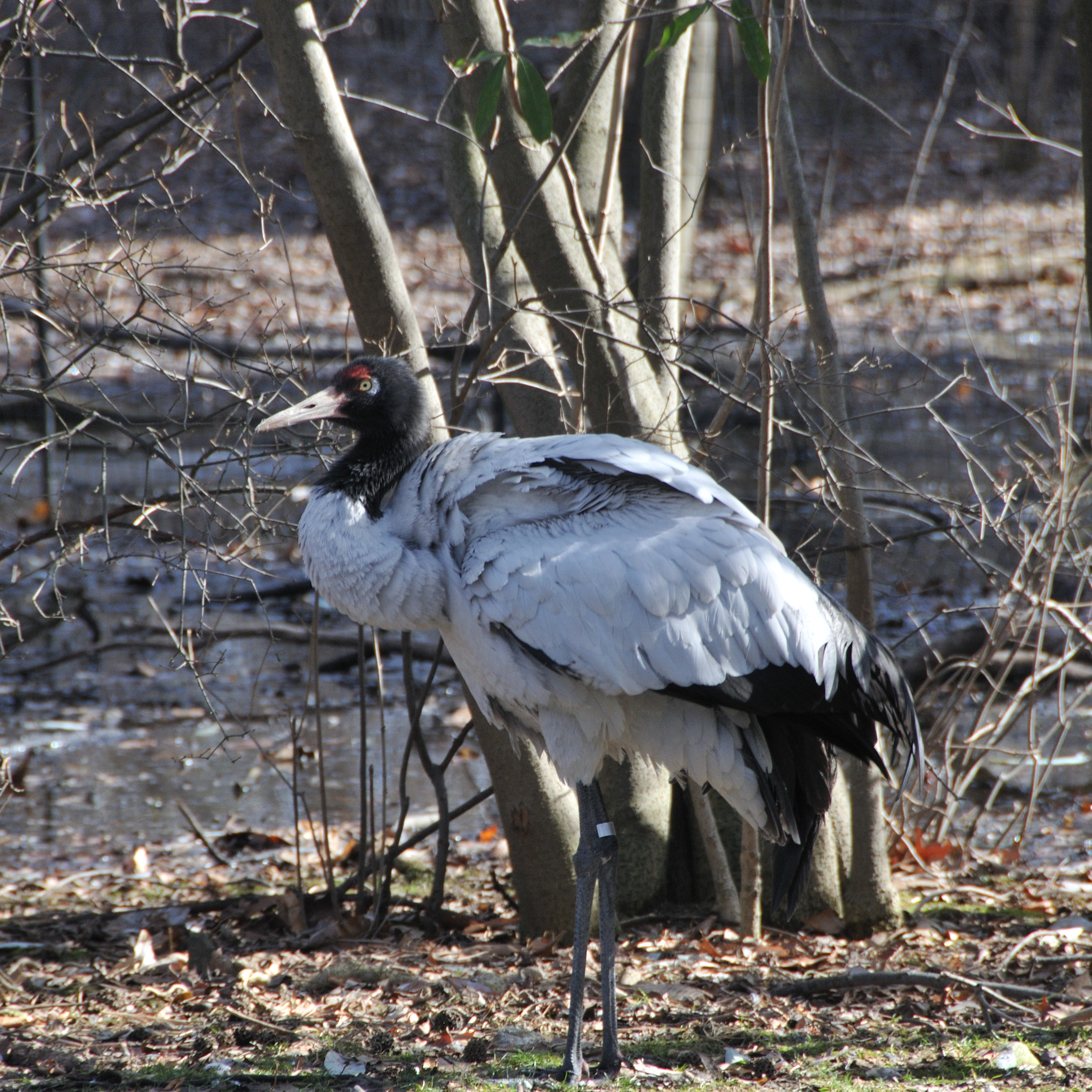
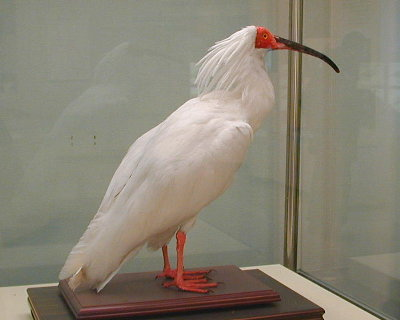
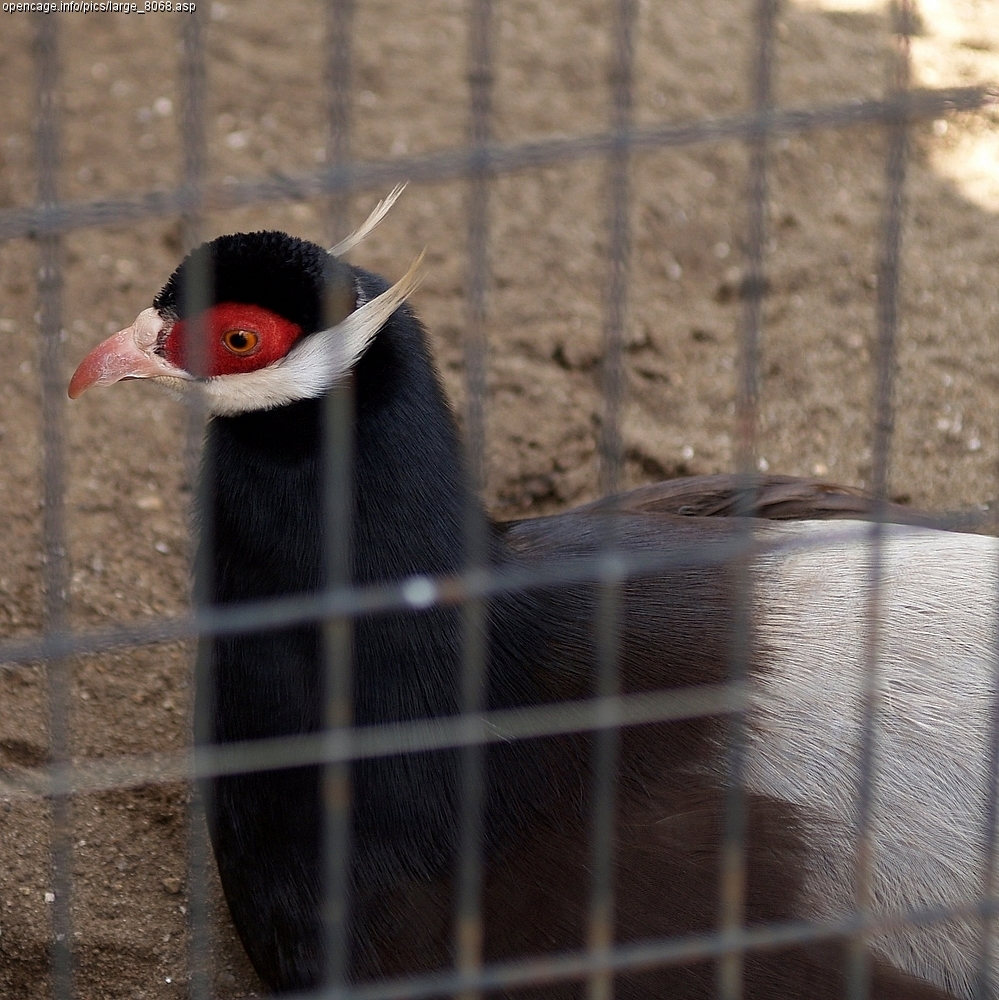
Provinces and territories (autonomous regions)	Provincial animals	Picture
Guangdong	Giant panda (territorial animal of Guangdong)
Guangdong	Silver pheasant (territorial bird of Guangdong)
Hainan	Hainan partridge
Ningxia	Blue-eared pheasant
Ningxia	Red panda
Qinghai	Black-necked crane
Shaanxi	Crested ibis
Shanxi	Brown eared pheasant

=== India ===
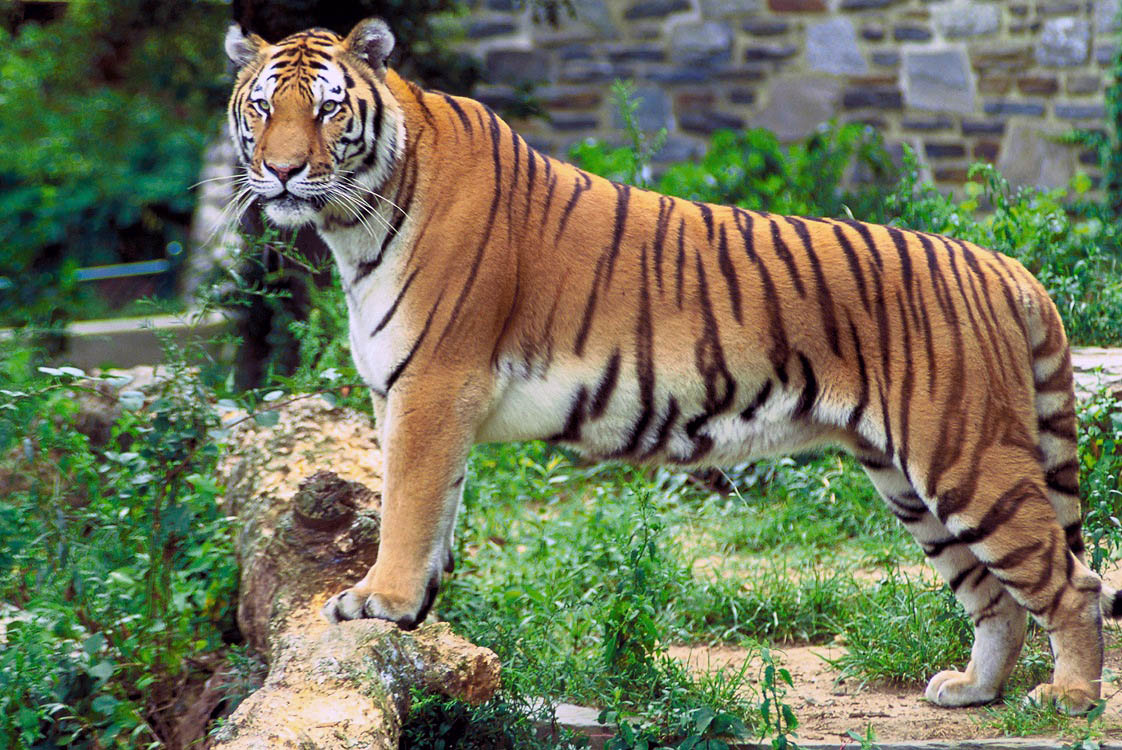
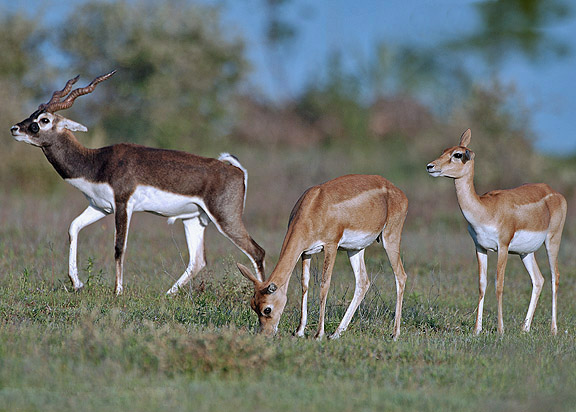
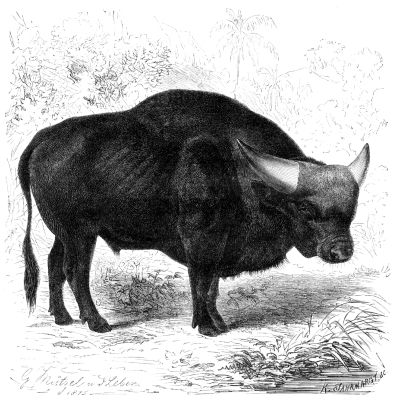
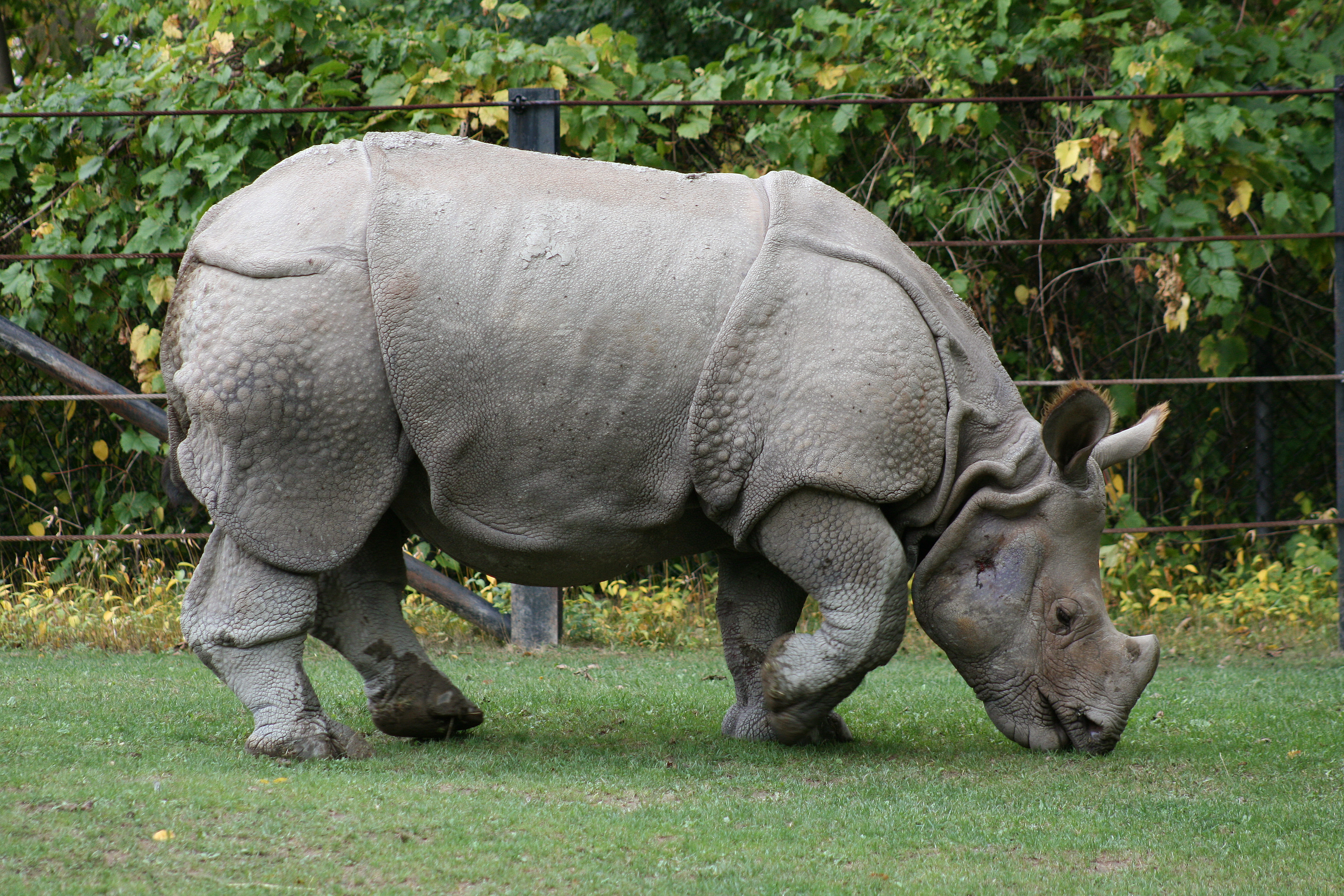
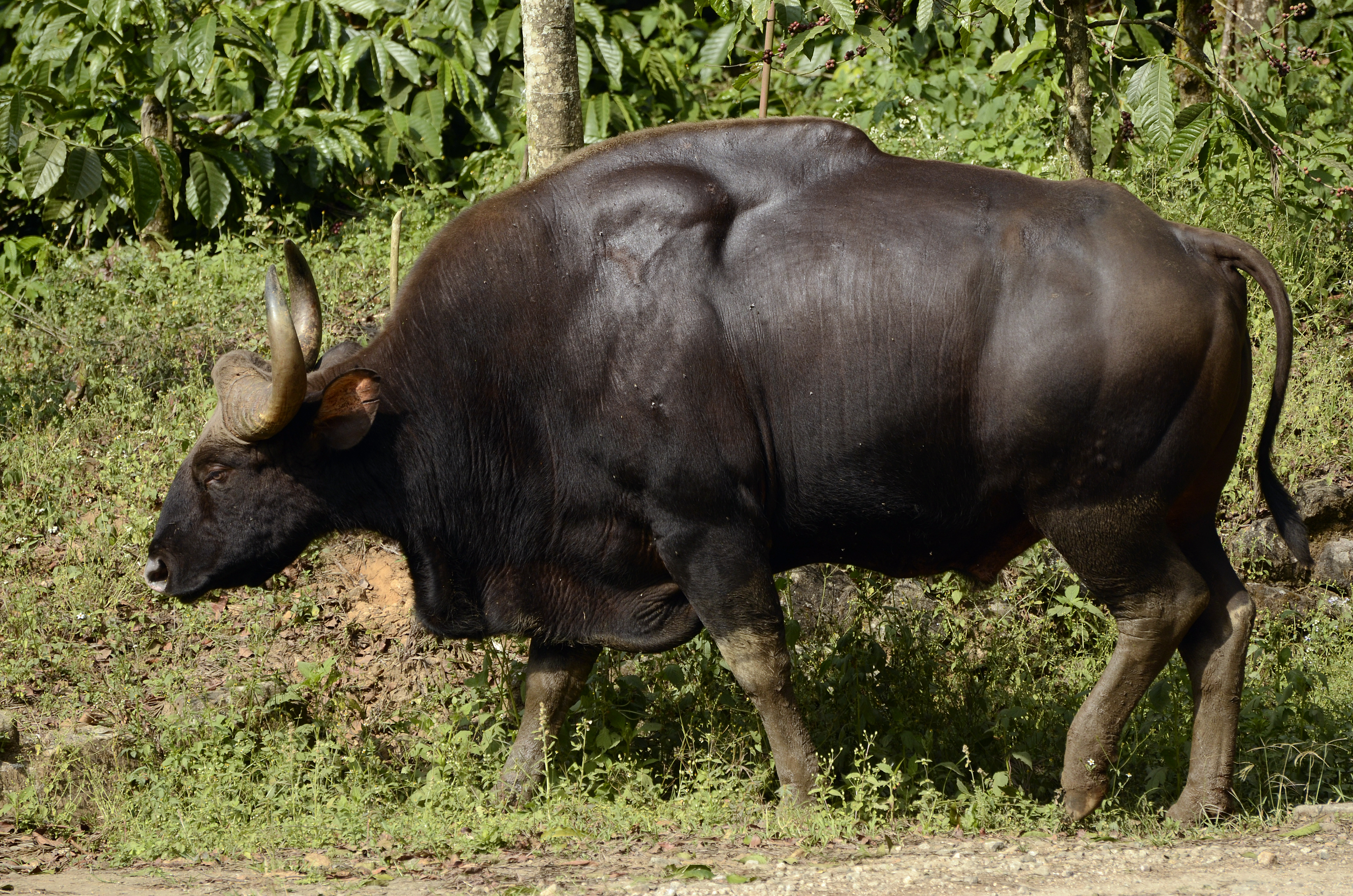
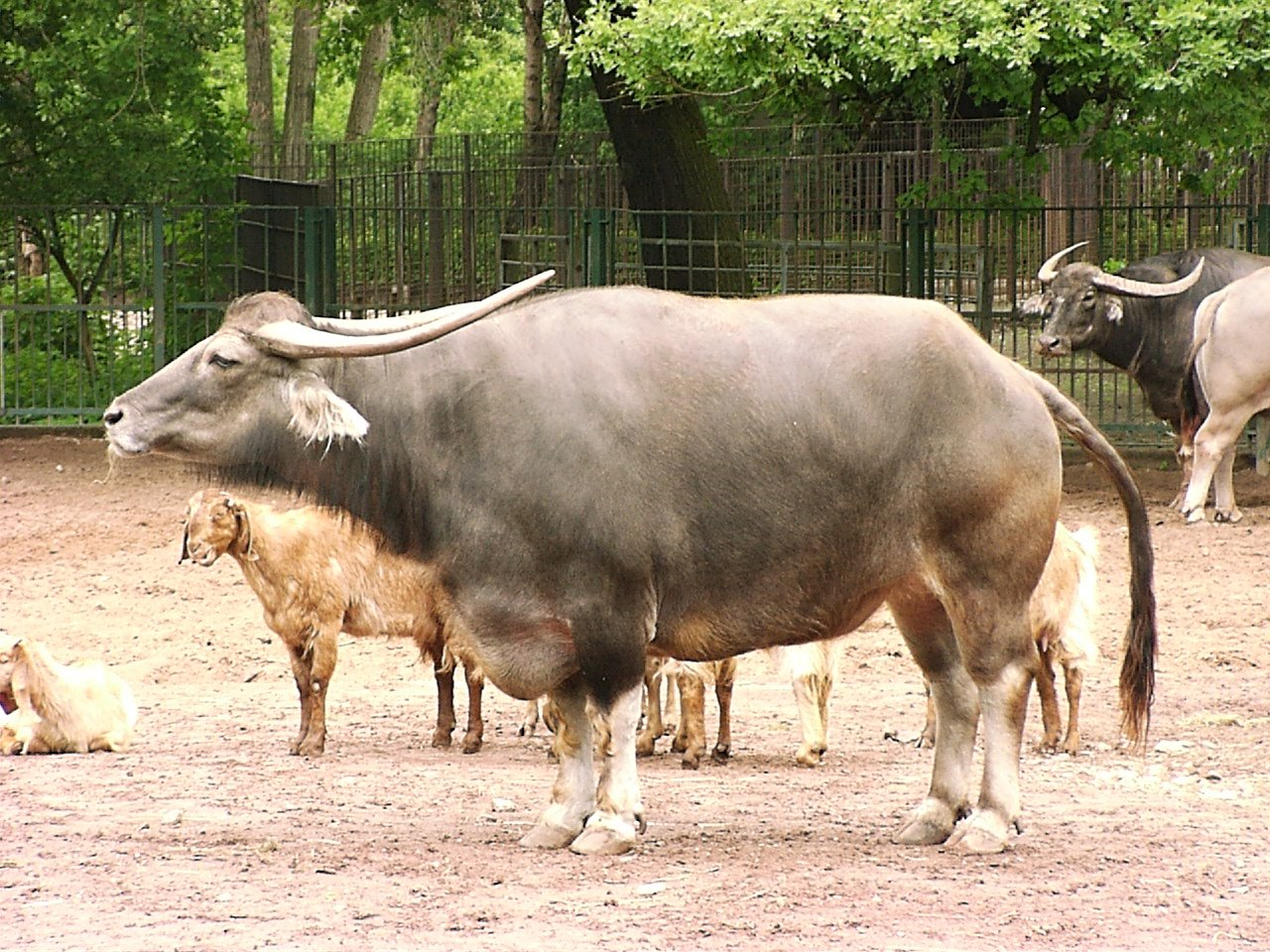
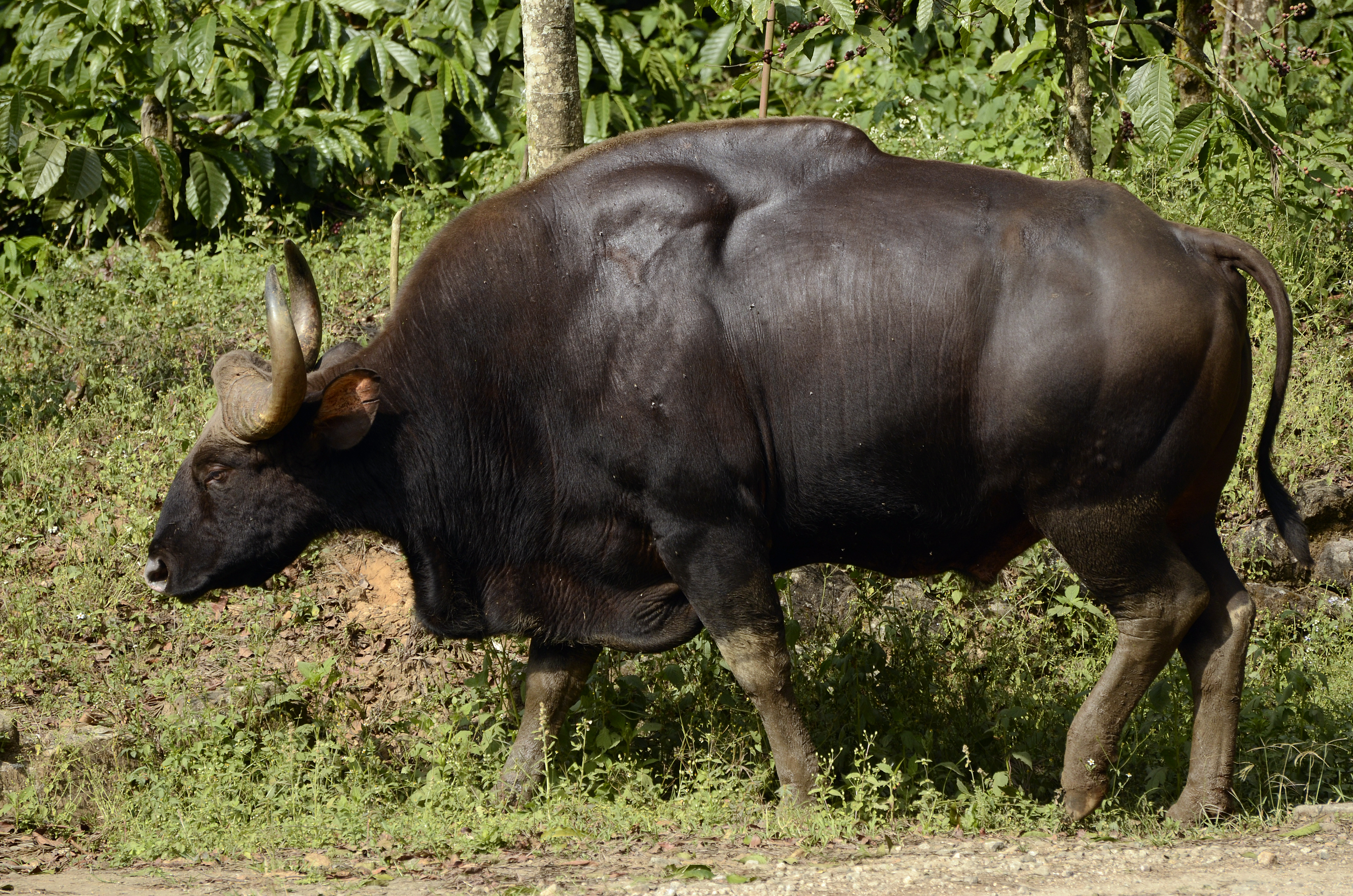
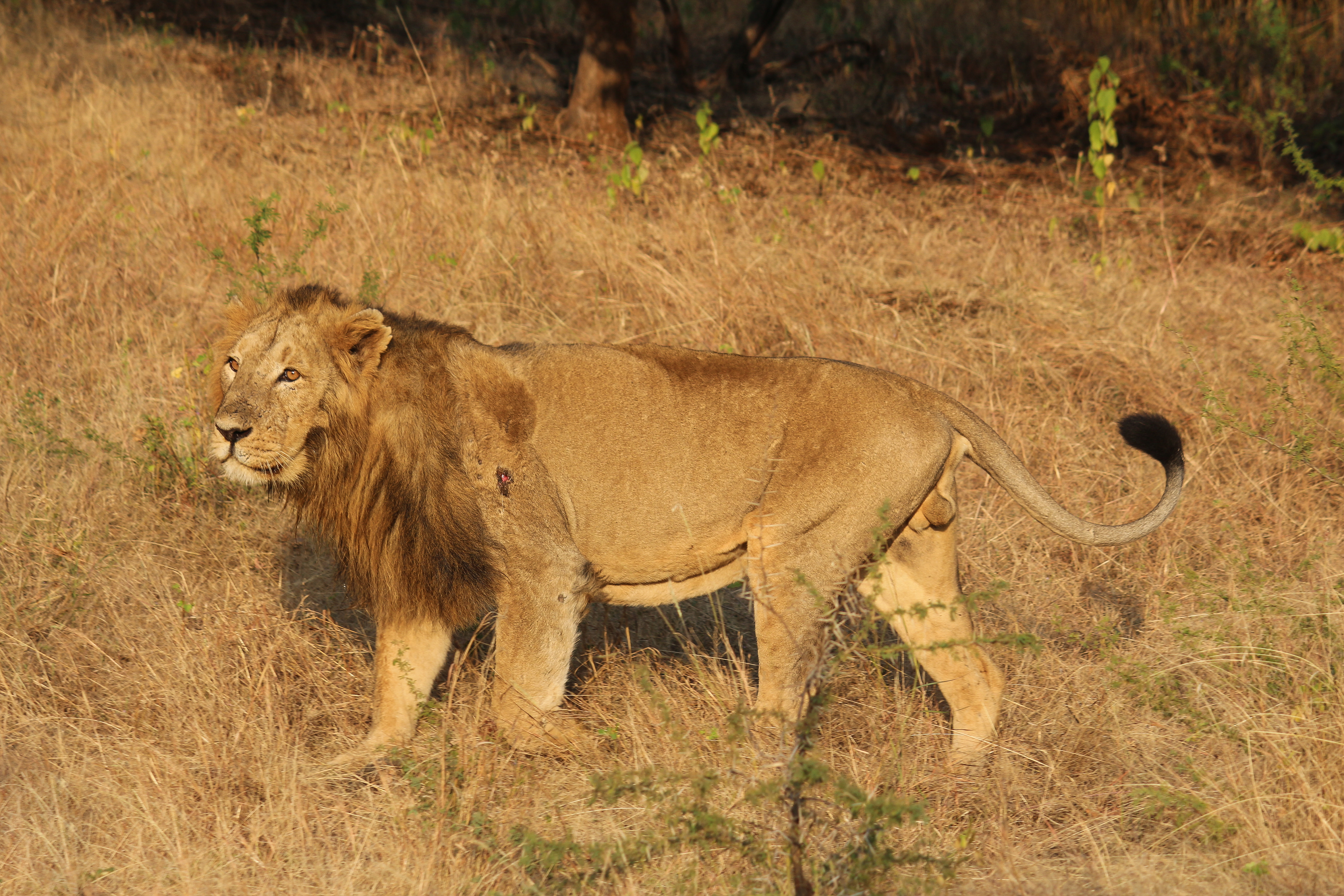
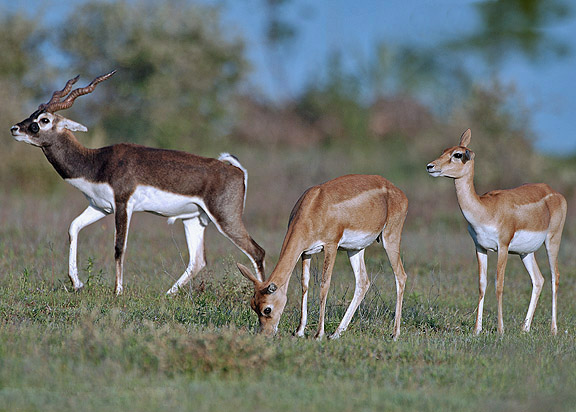
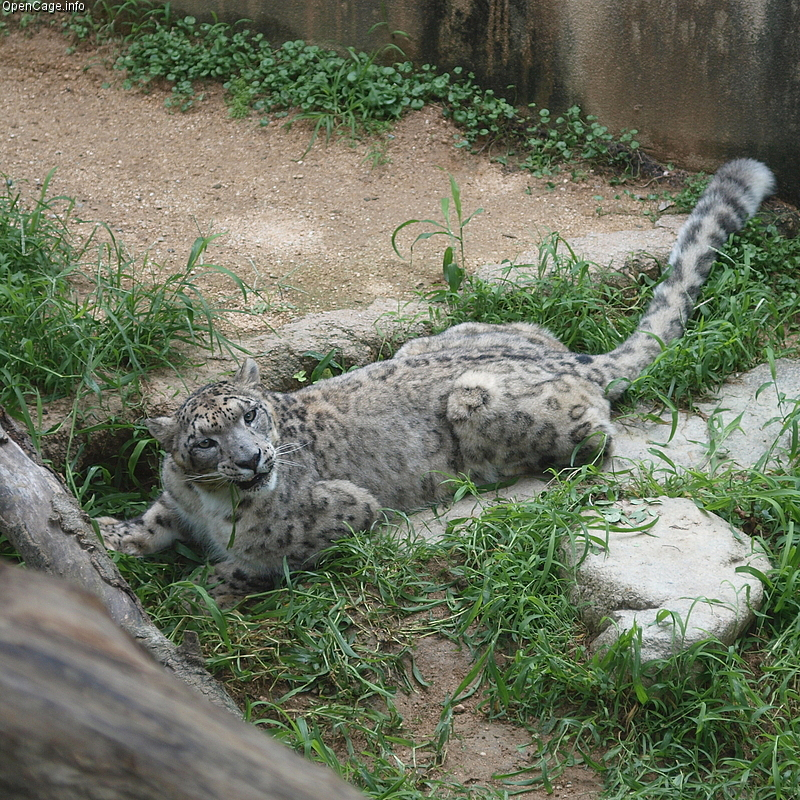
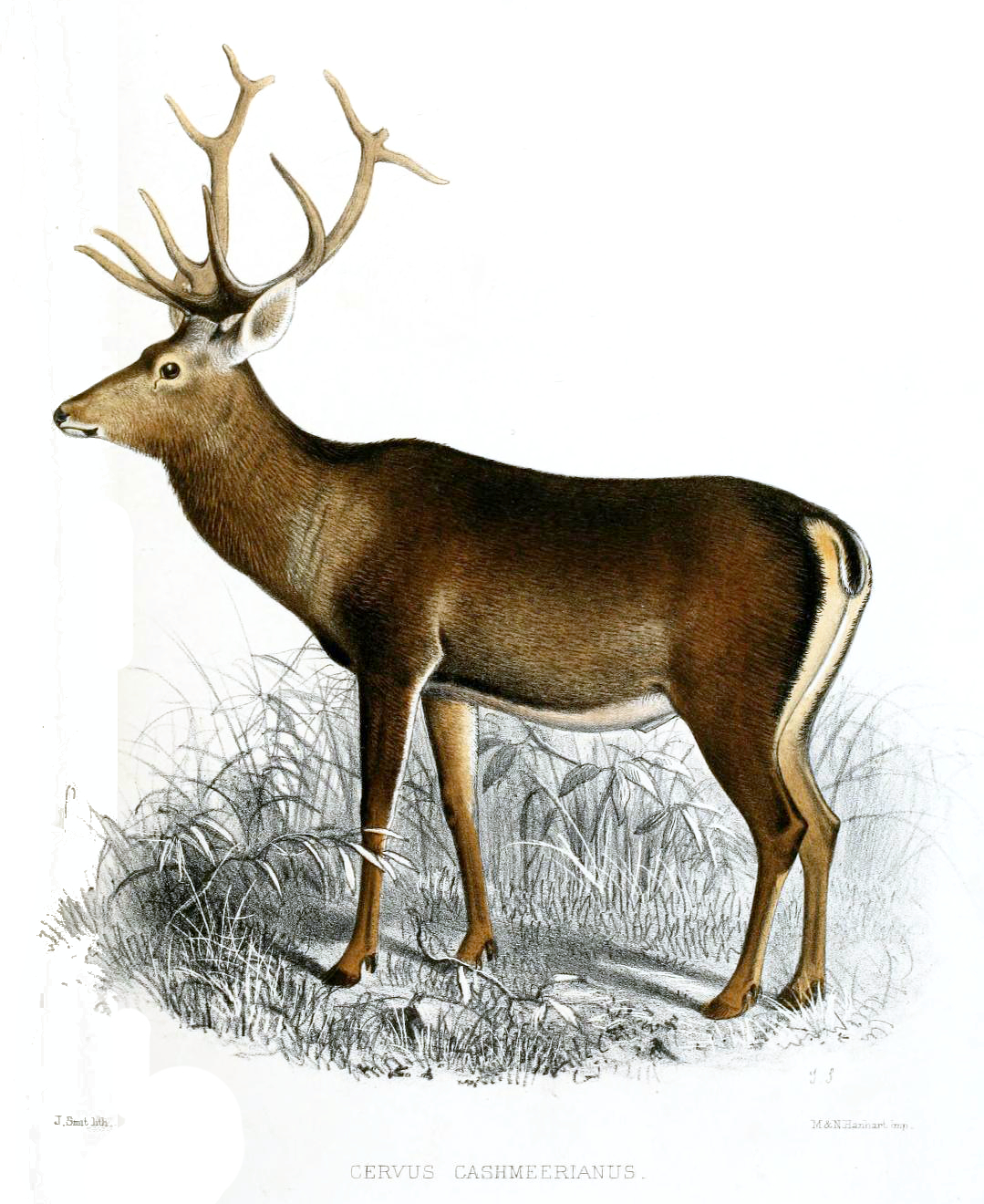
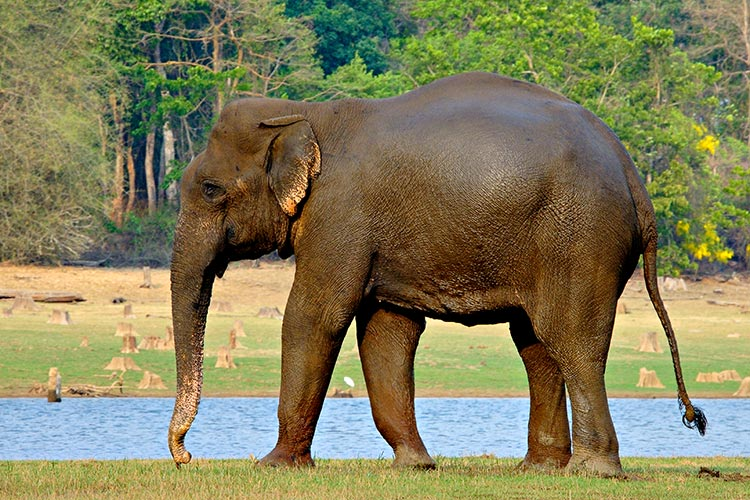
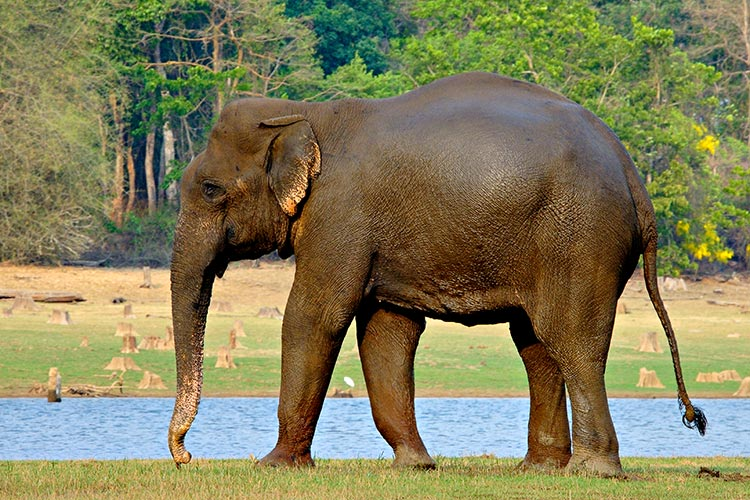
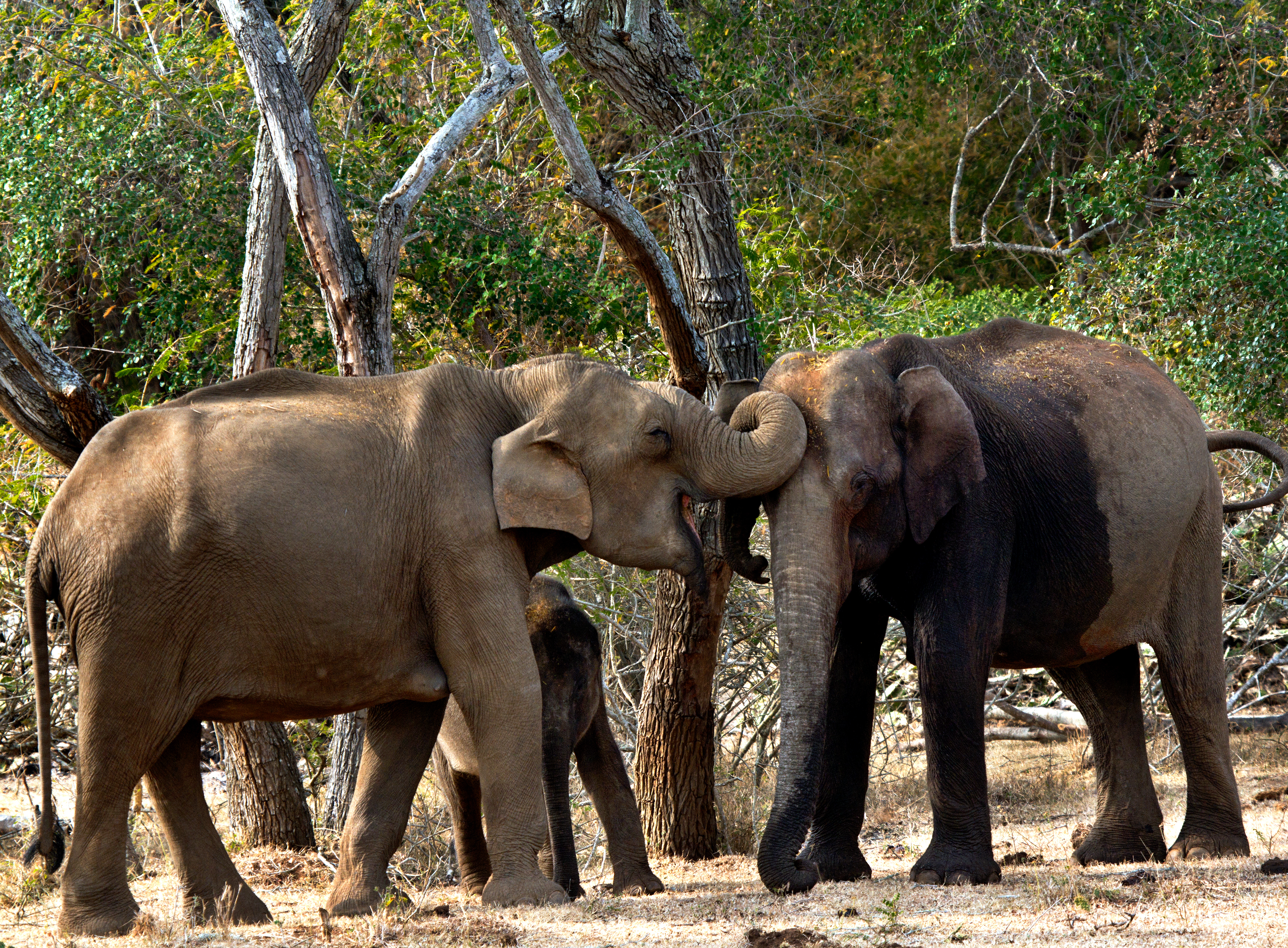
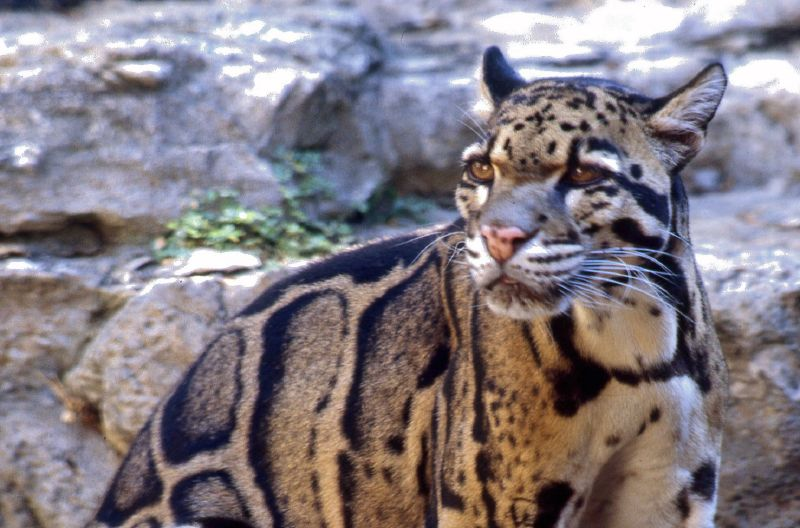
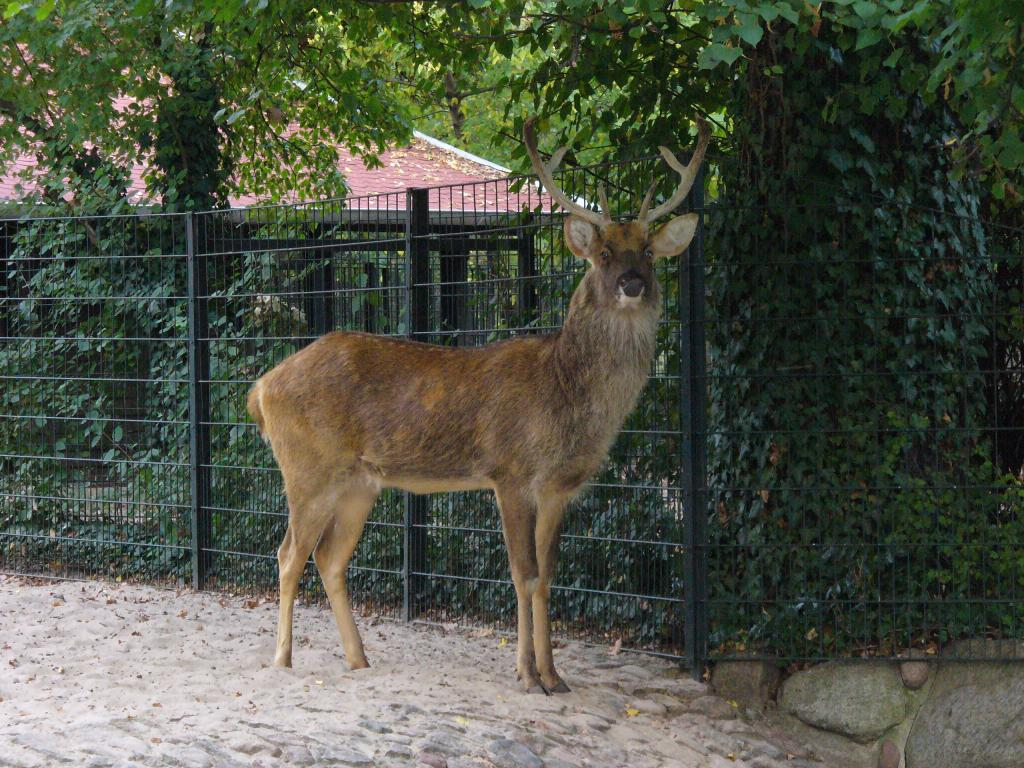
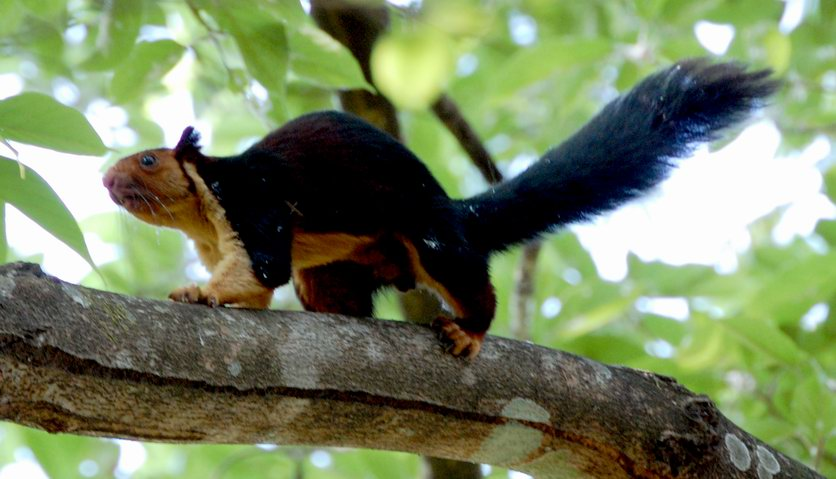
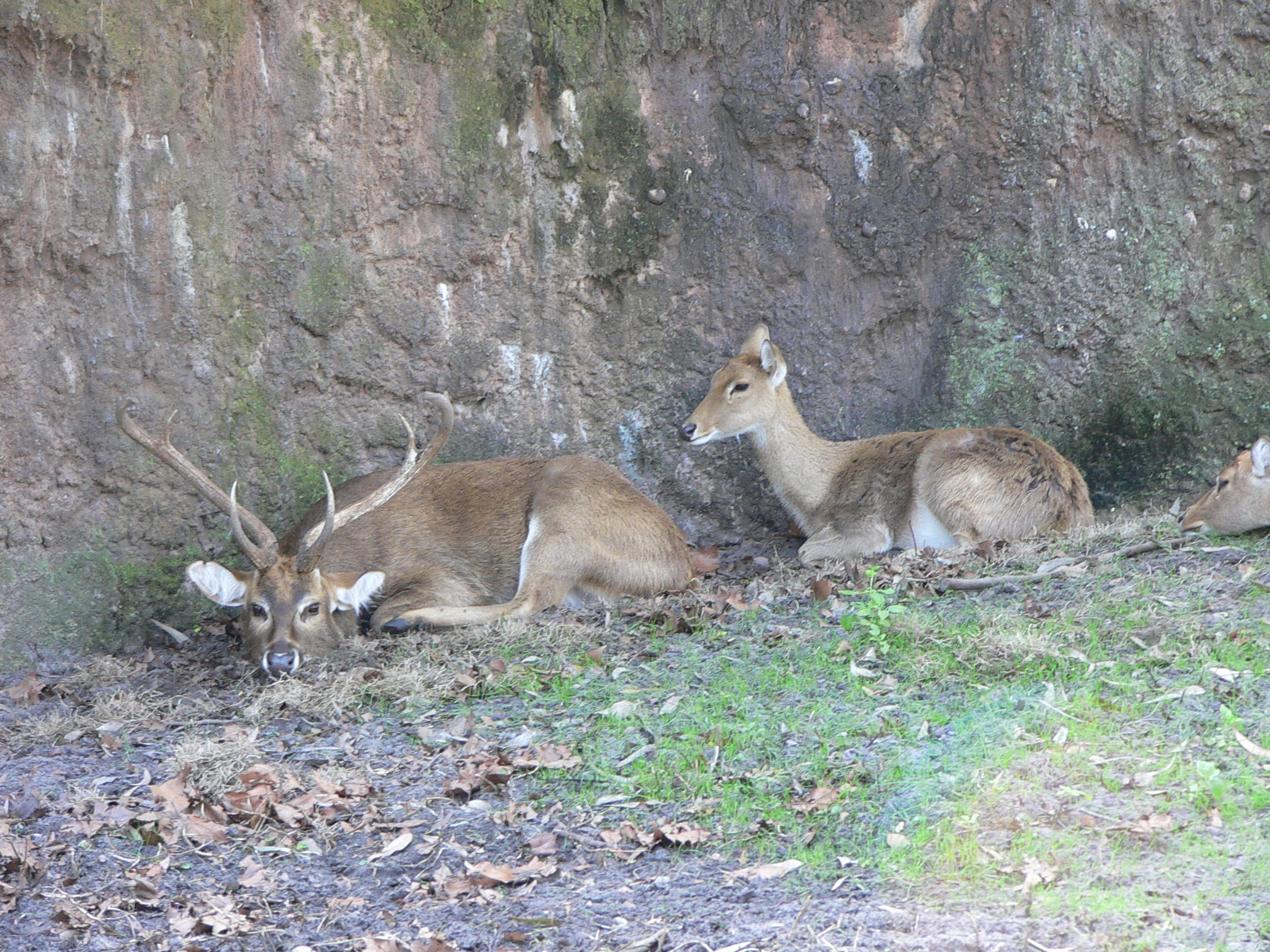
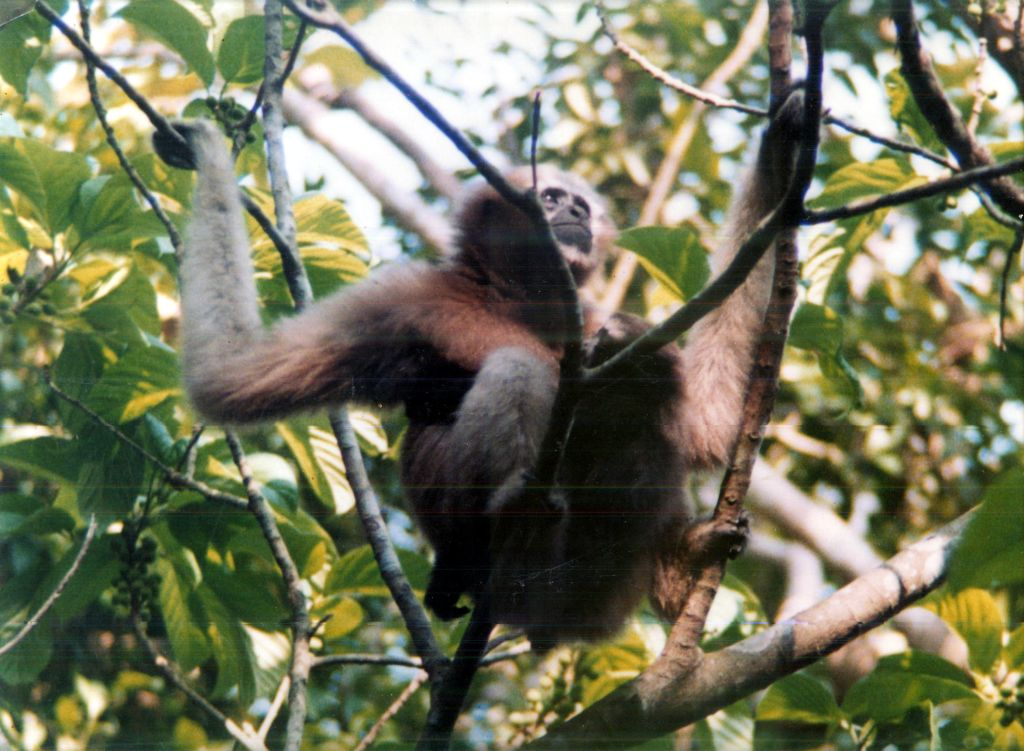
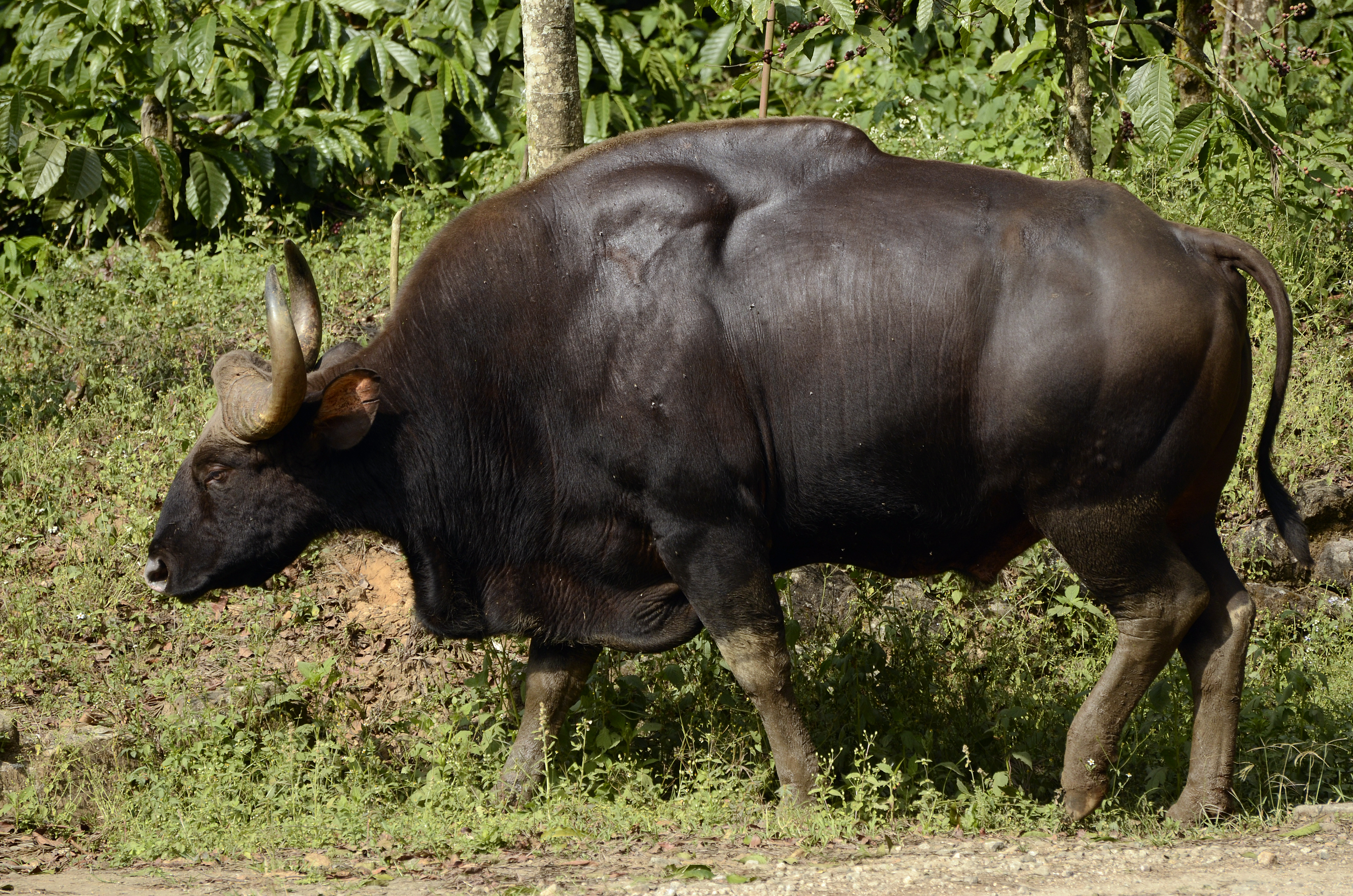
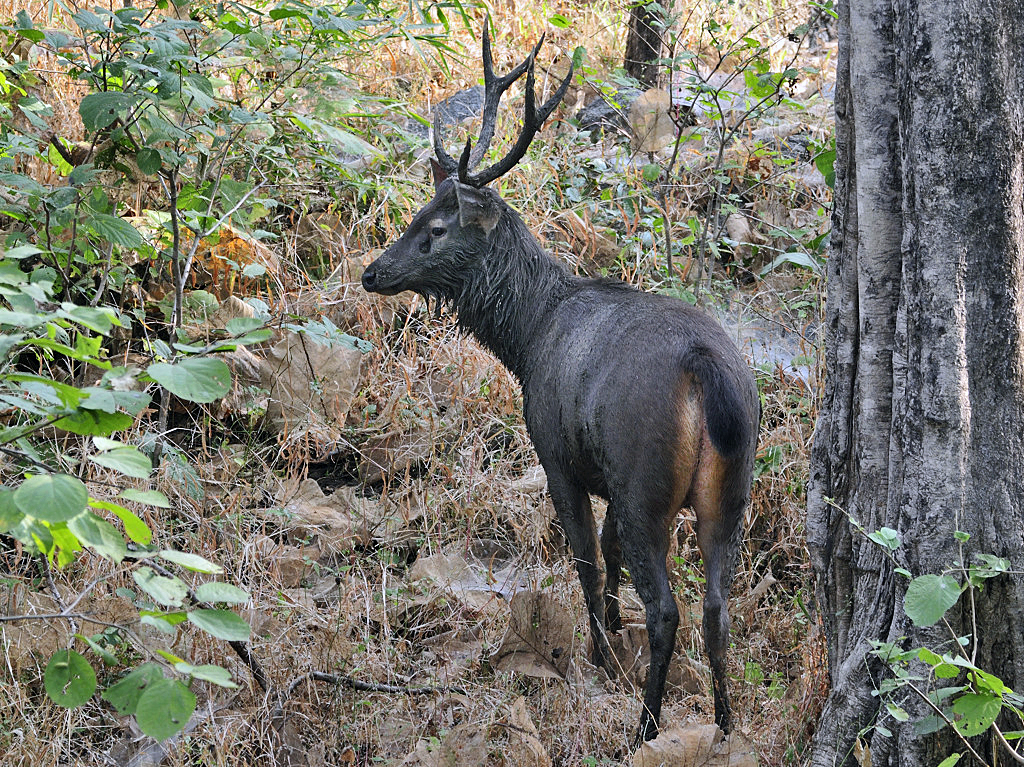
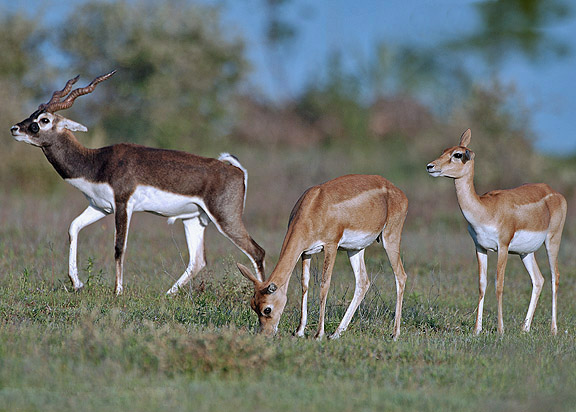
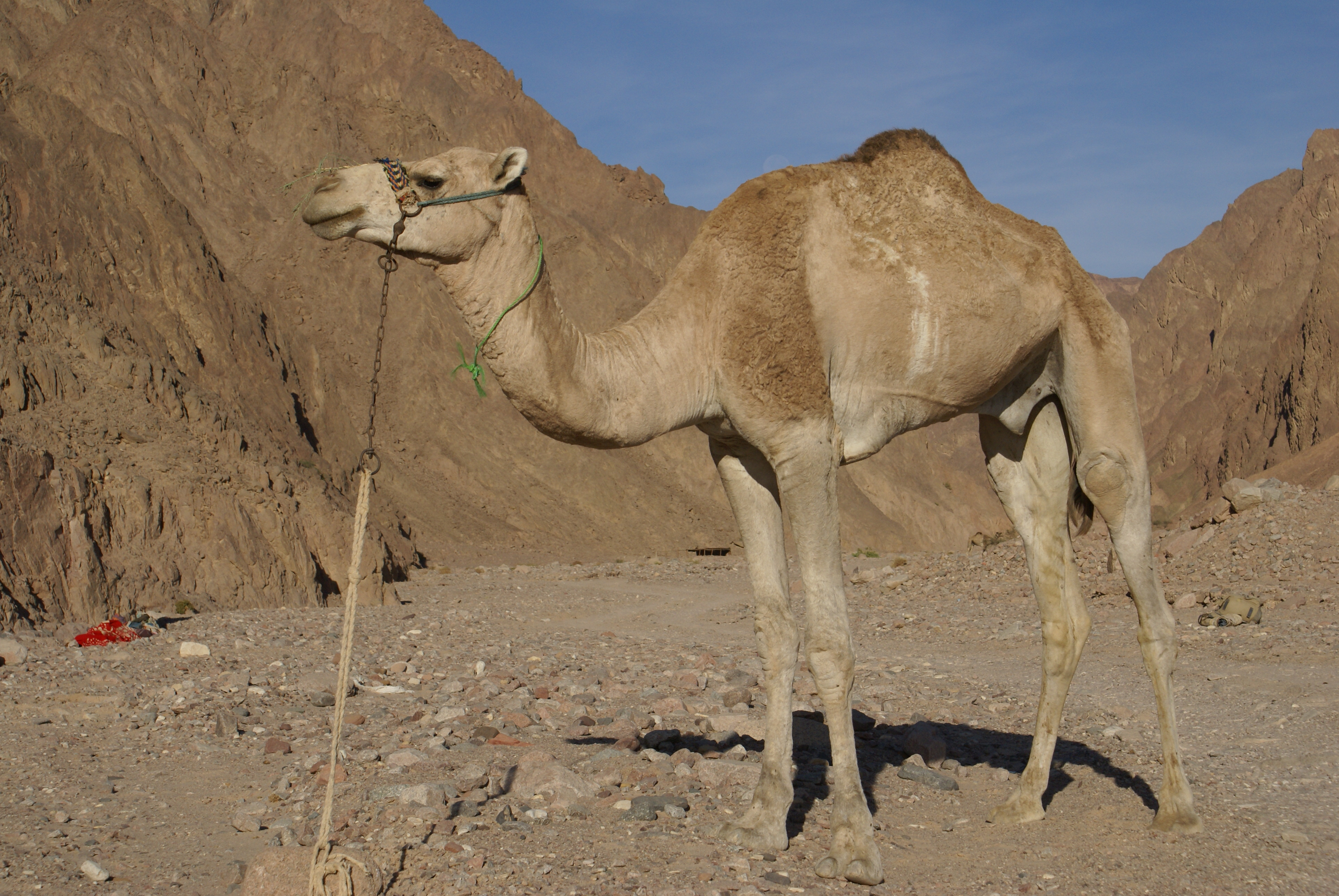
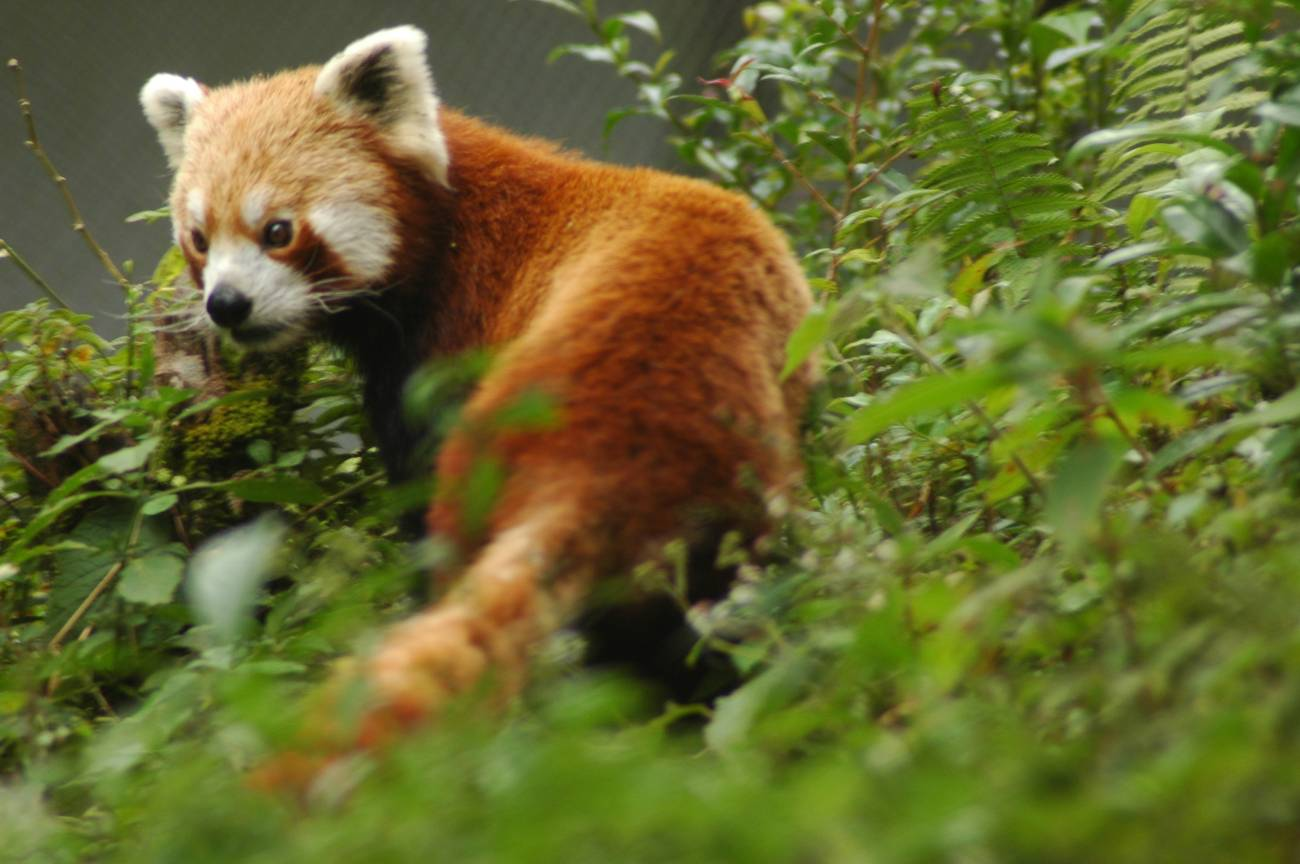
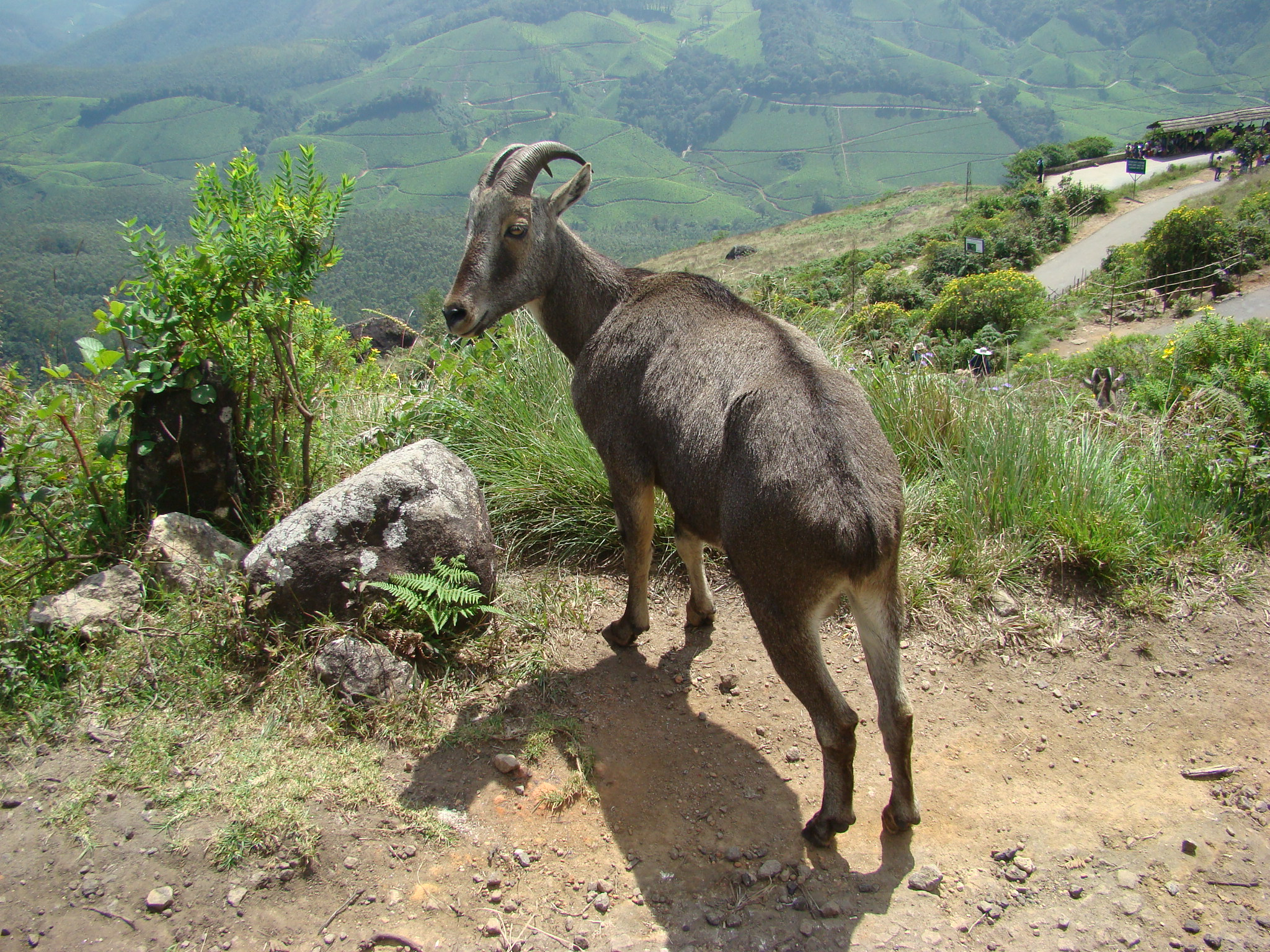
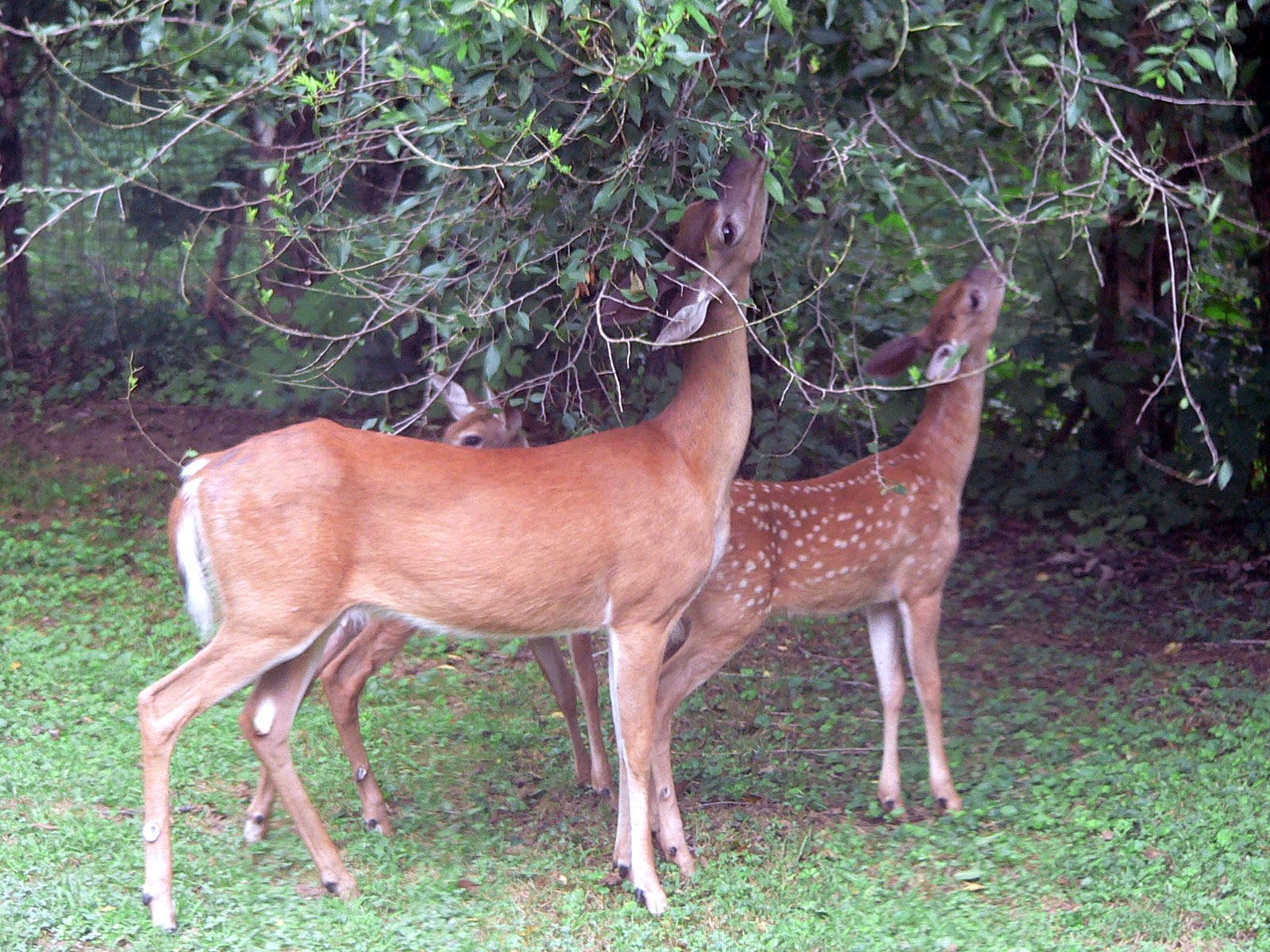
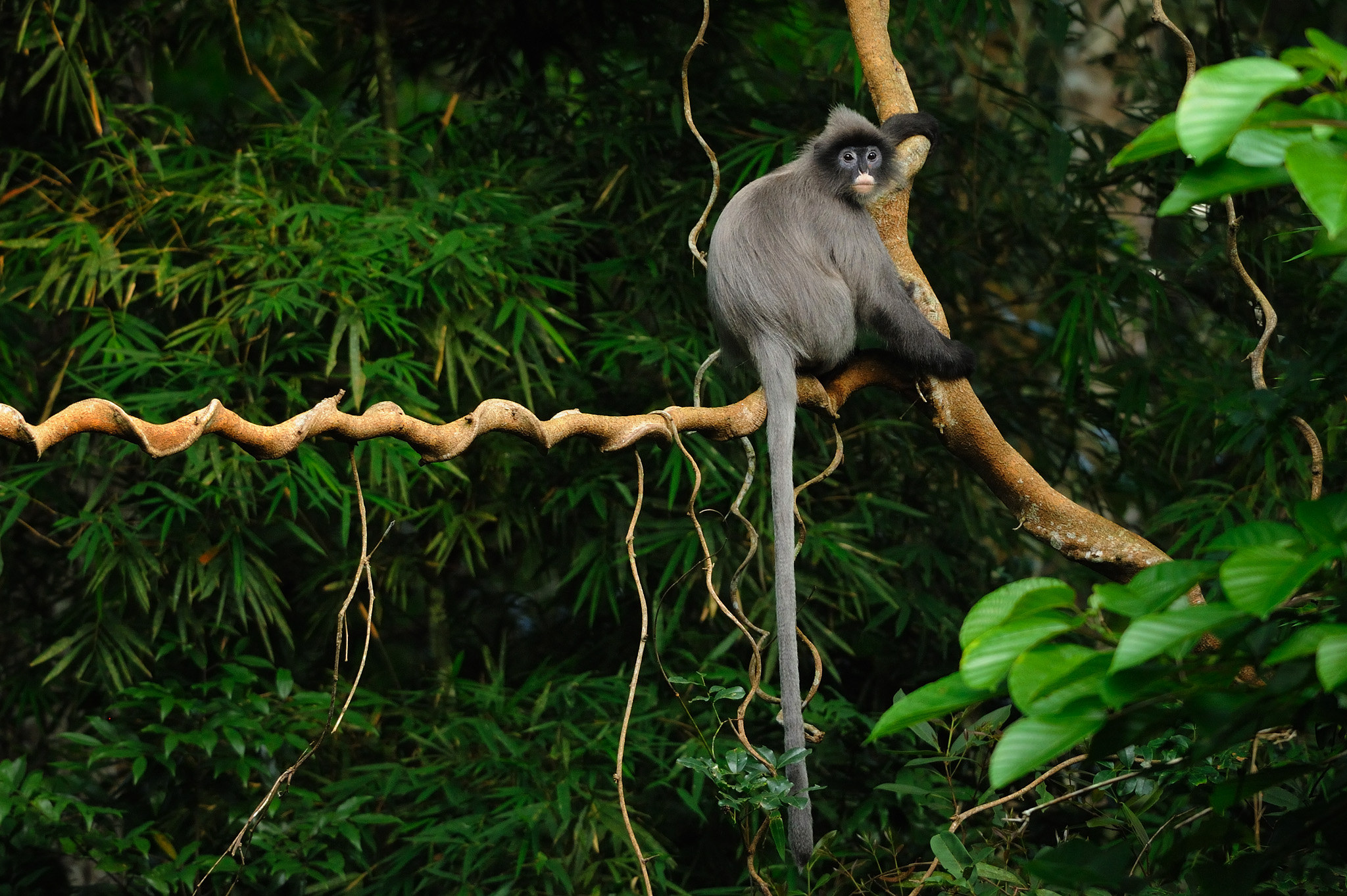
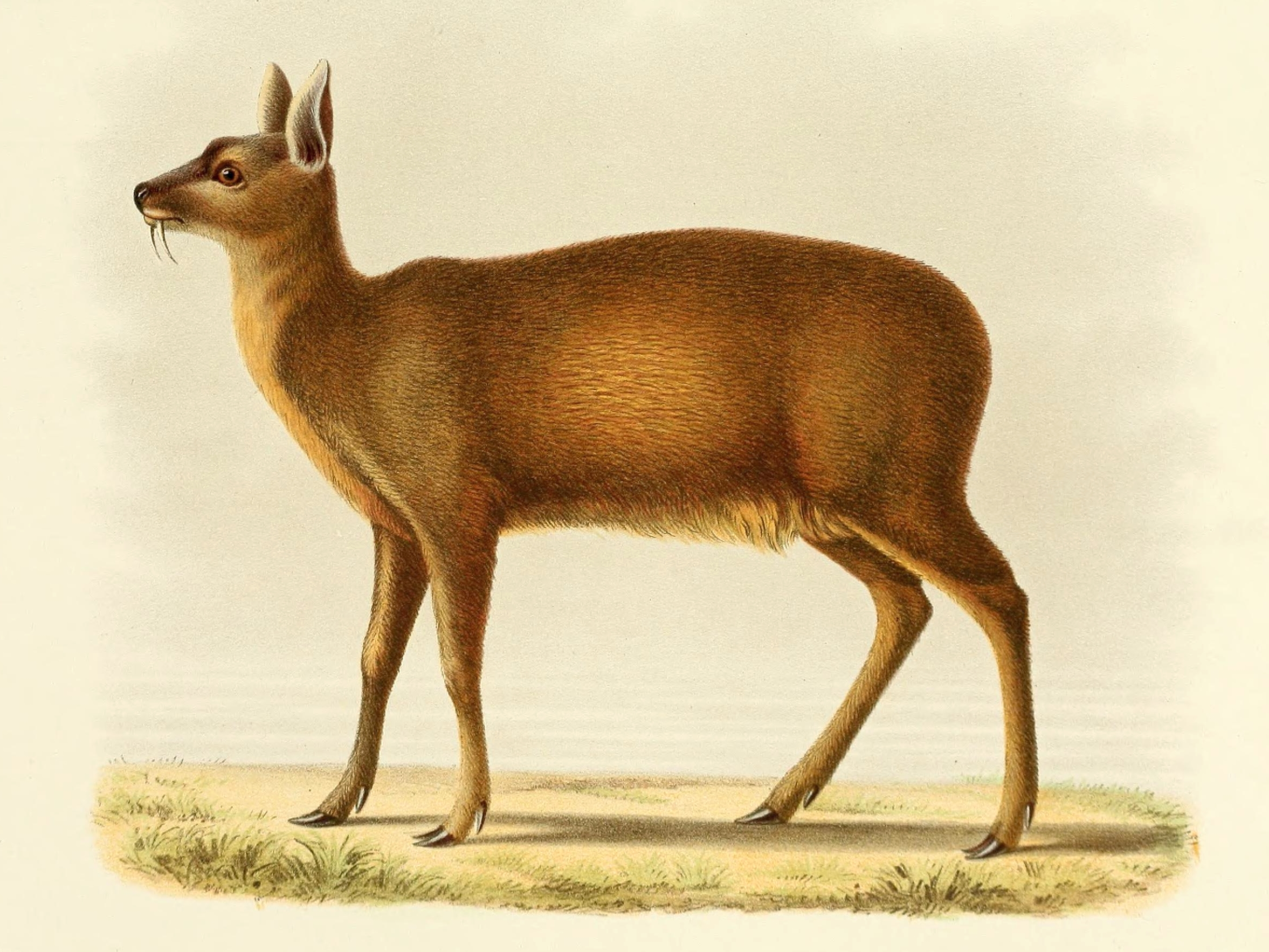
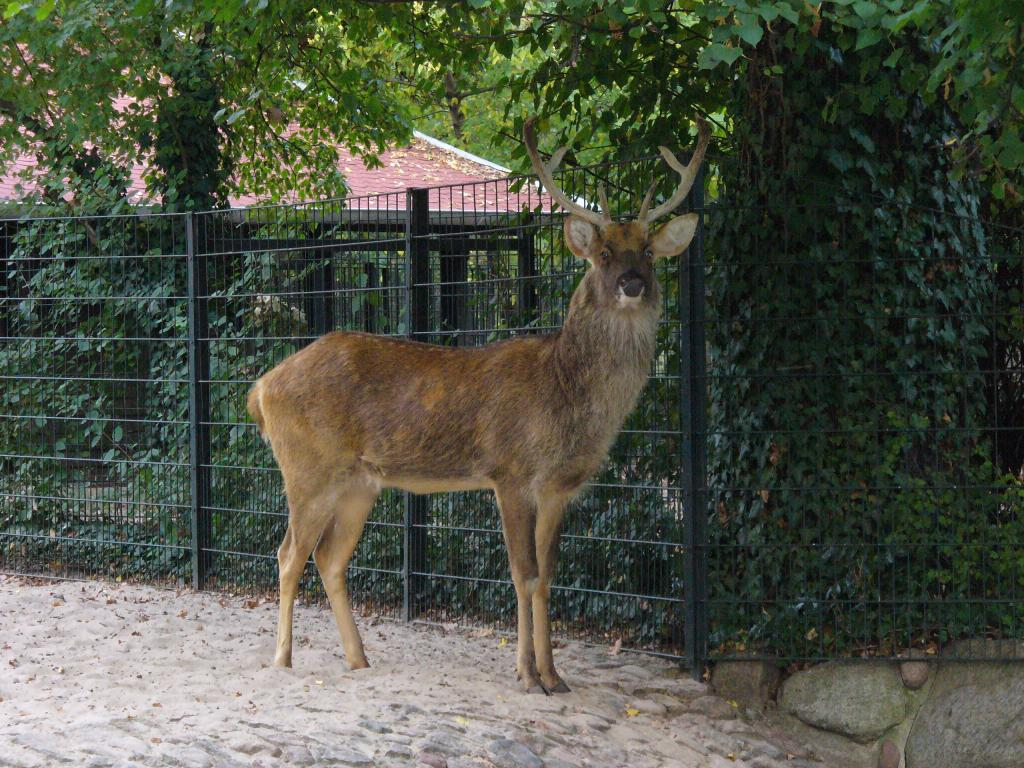
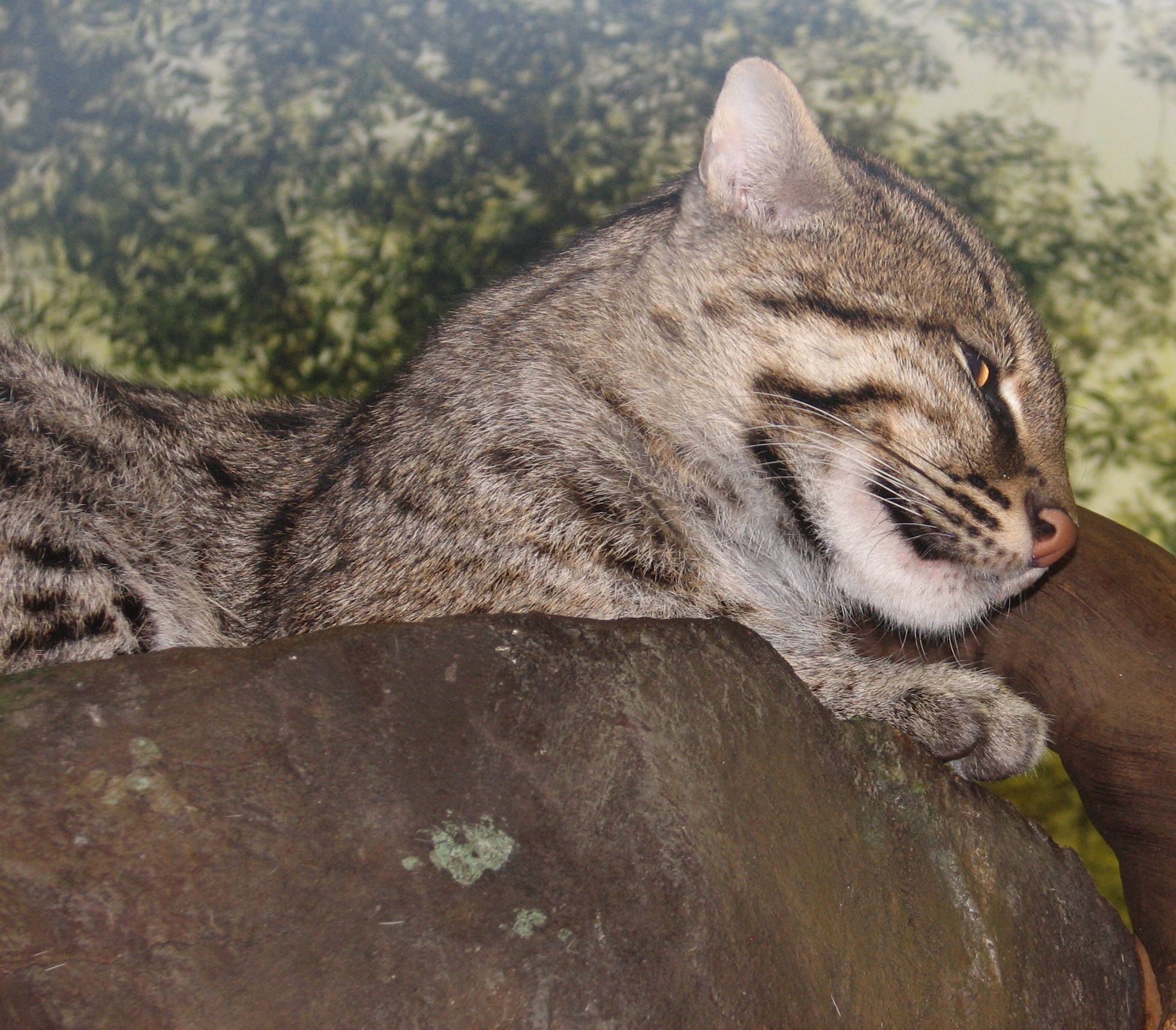
Country	National animal
India	Bengal tiger
State	State animals	Pictures
Andhra Pradesh	Blackbuck
Arunachal Pradesh	Gayal
Assam	One-horned rhino
Bihar	Gaur
Chhattisgarh	Wild buffalo
Goa	Gaur
Gujarat	Asiatic lion
Haryana	Blackbuck
Himachal Pradesh	Snow leopard
Jammu and Kashmir	Kashmir Stag (Hangul)
Jharkhand	Indian elephant
Karnataka	Indian elephant
Kerala	Indian elephant
Meghalaya	Clouded leopard
Madhya Pradesh	Barasingha
Maharashtra	Indian giant squirrel
Manipur	Sangai
Mizoram	Hoolock gibbon
Nagaland	Gaur
Odisha	Sambar
Punjab	Blackbuck
Rajasthan	Dromedary Camel
Sikkim	Red panda
Tamil Nadu	Nilgiri tahr
Telangana	Spotted deer
Tripura	Phayre's langur
Uttarakhand	Alpine musk deer
Uttar Pradesh	Swamp deer
West Bengal	Fishing cat

=== Indonesia ===
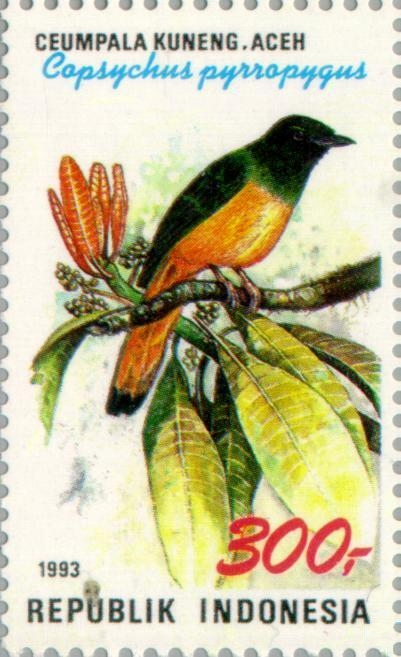
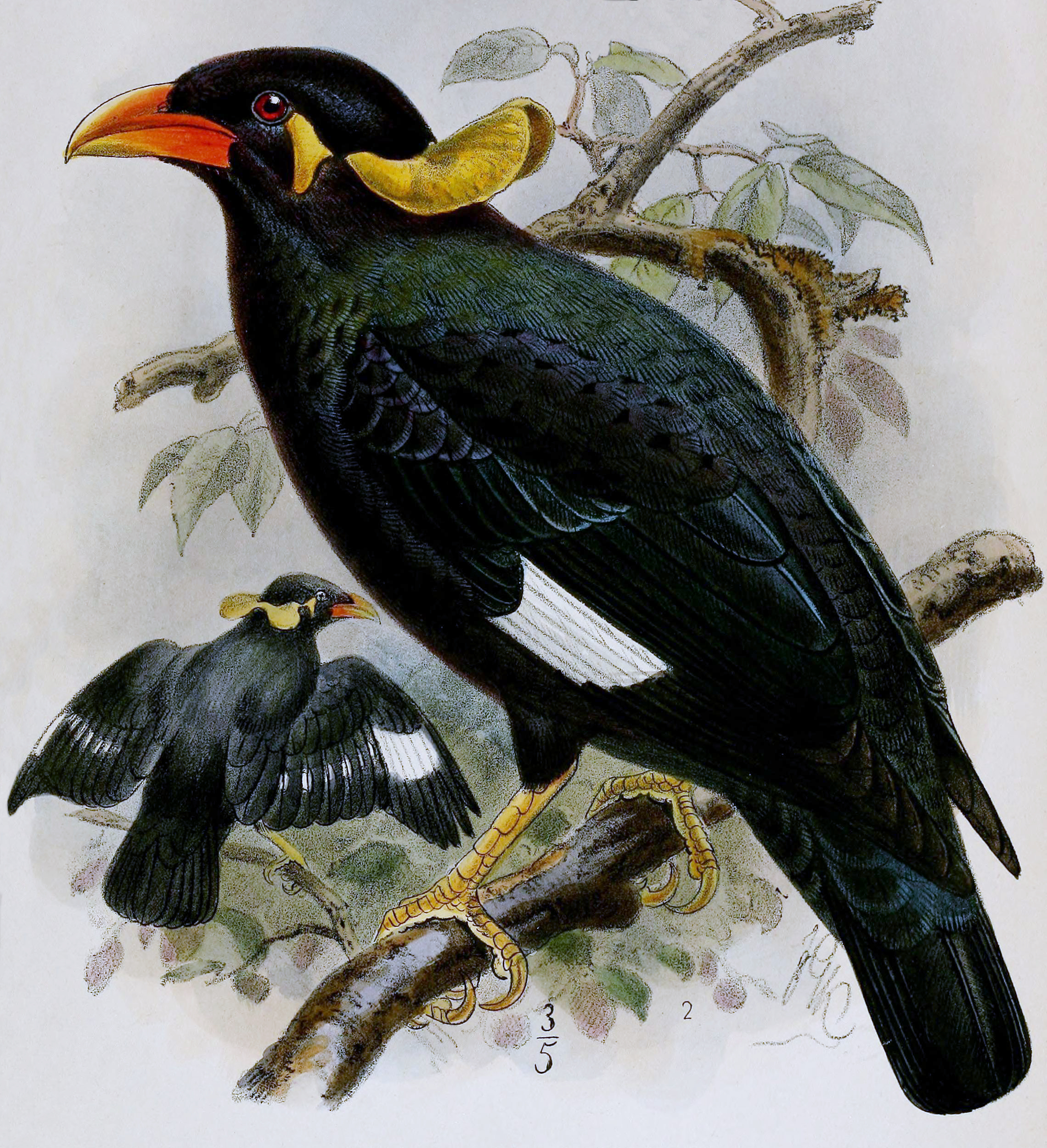
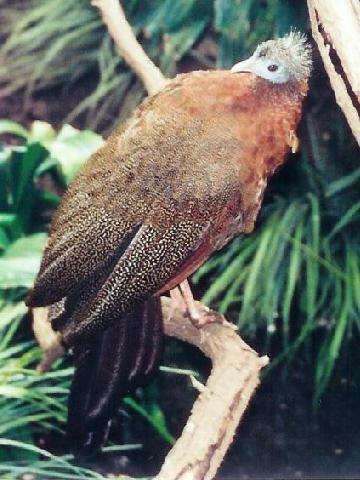
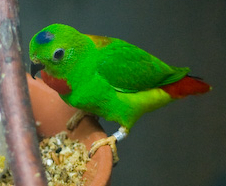
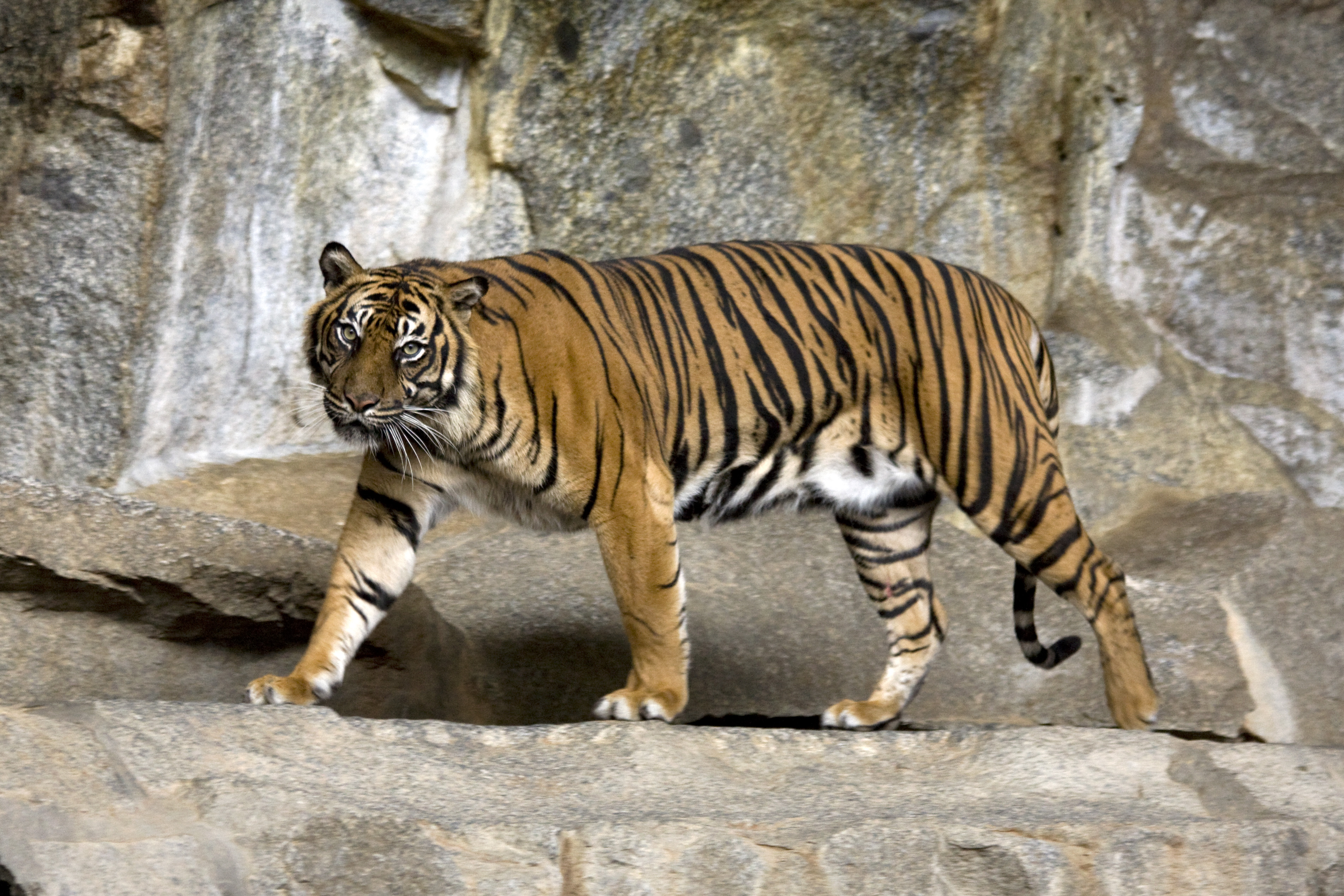
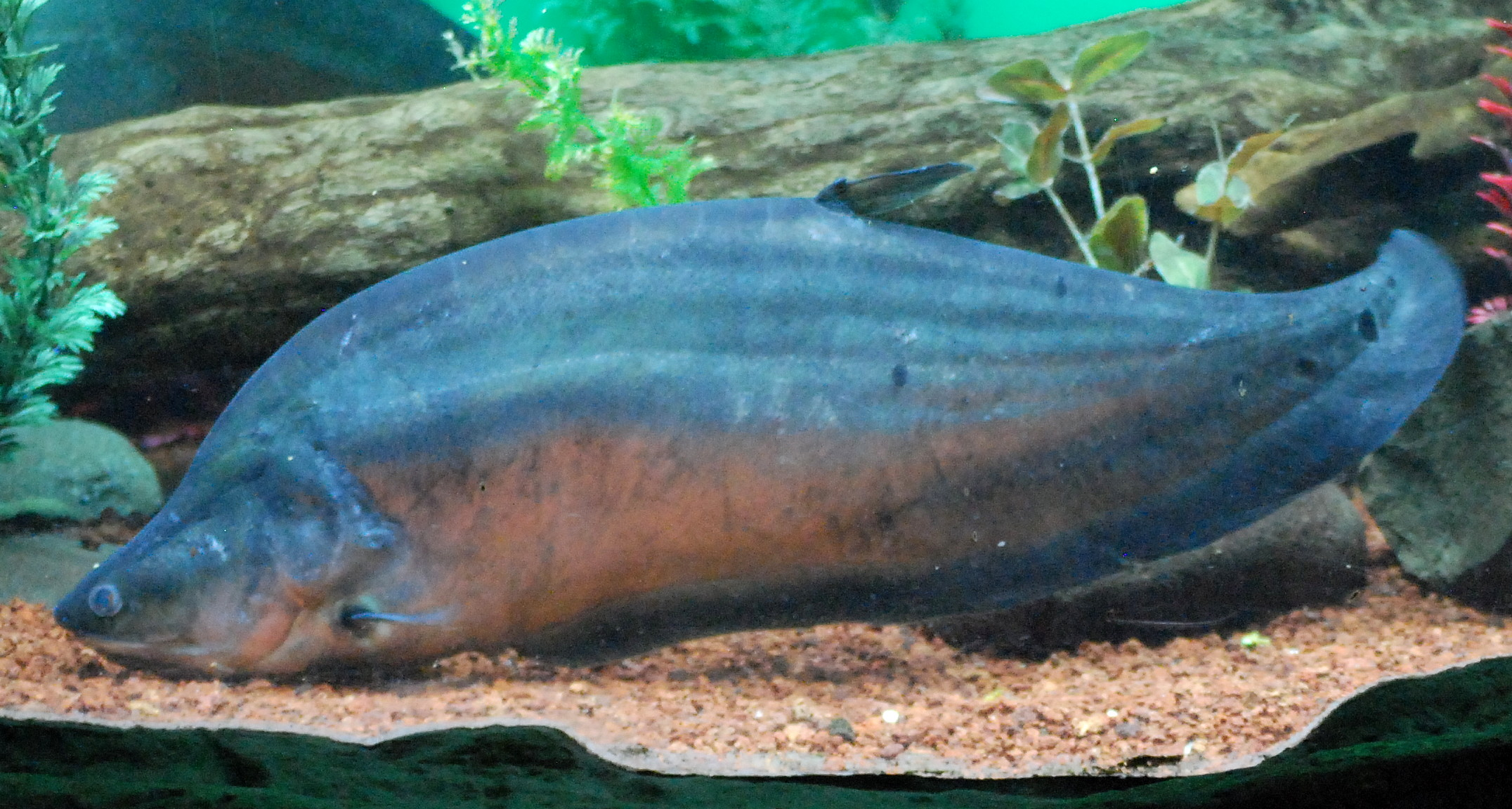
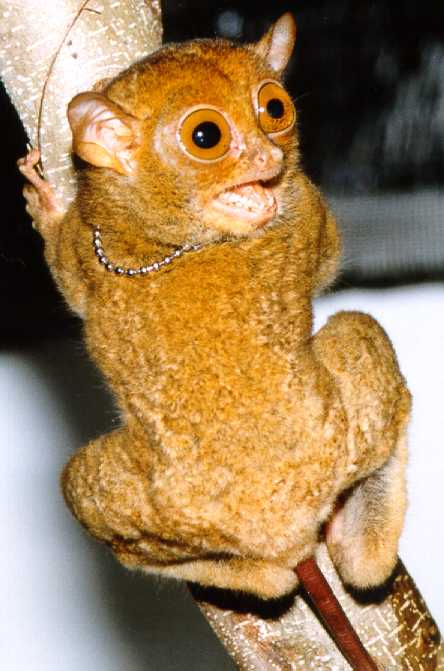
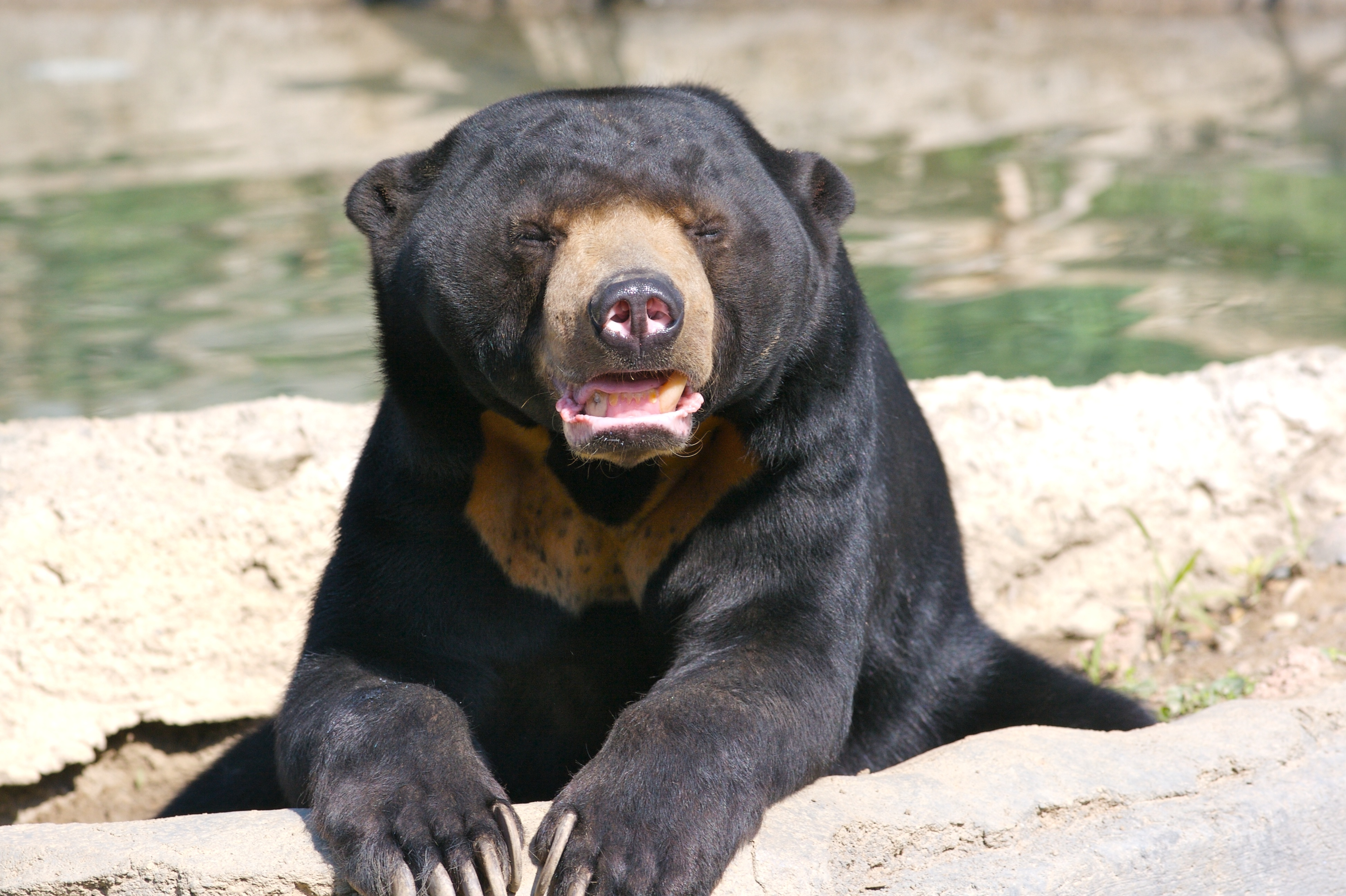
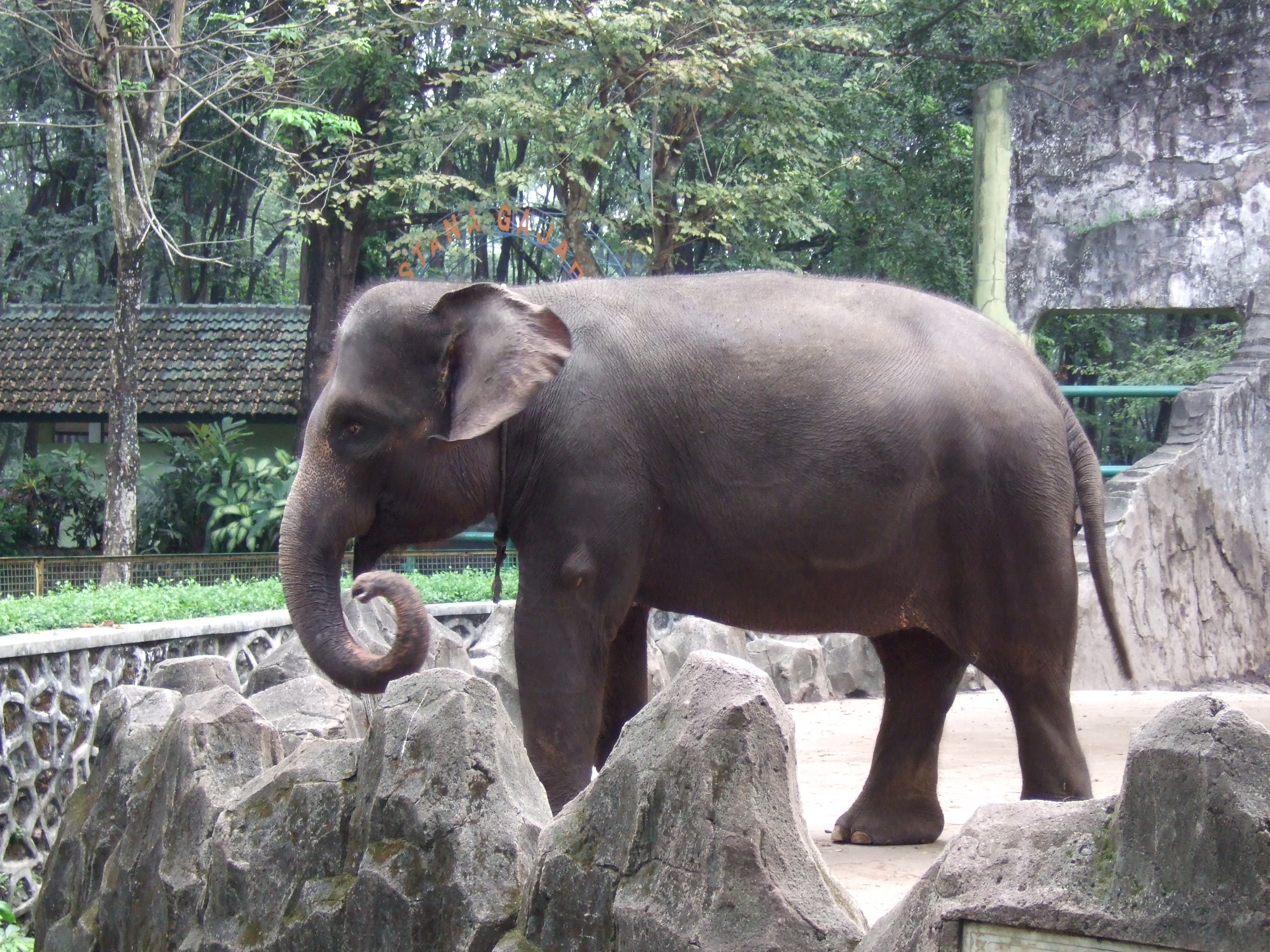
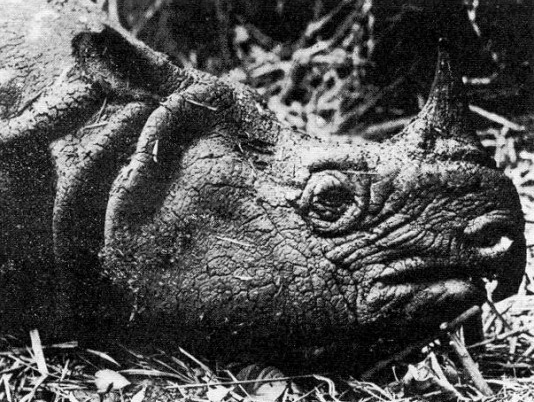
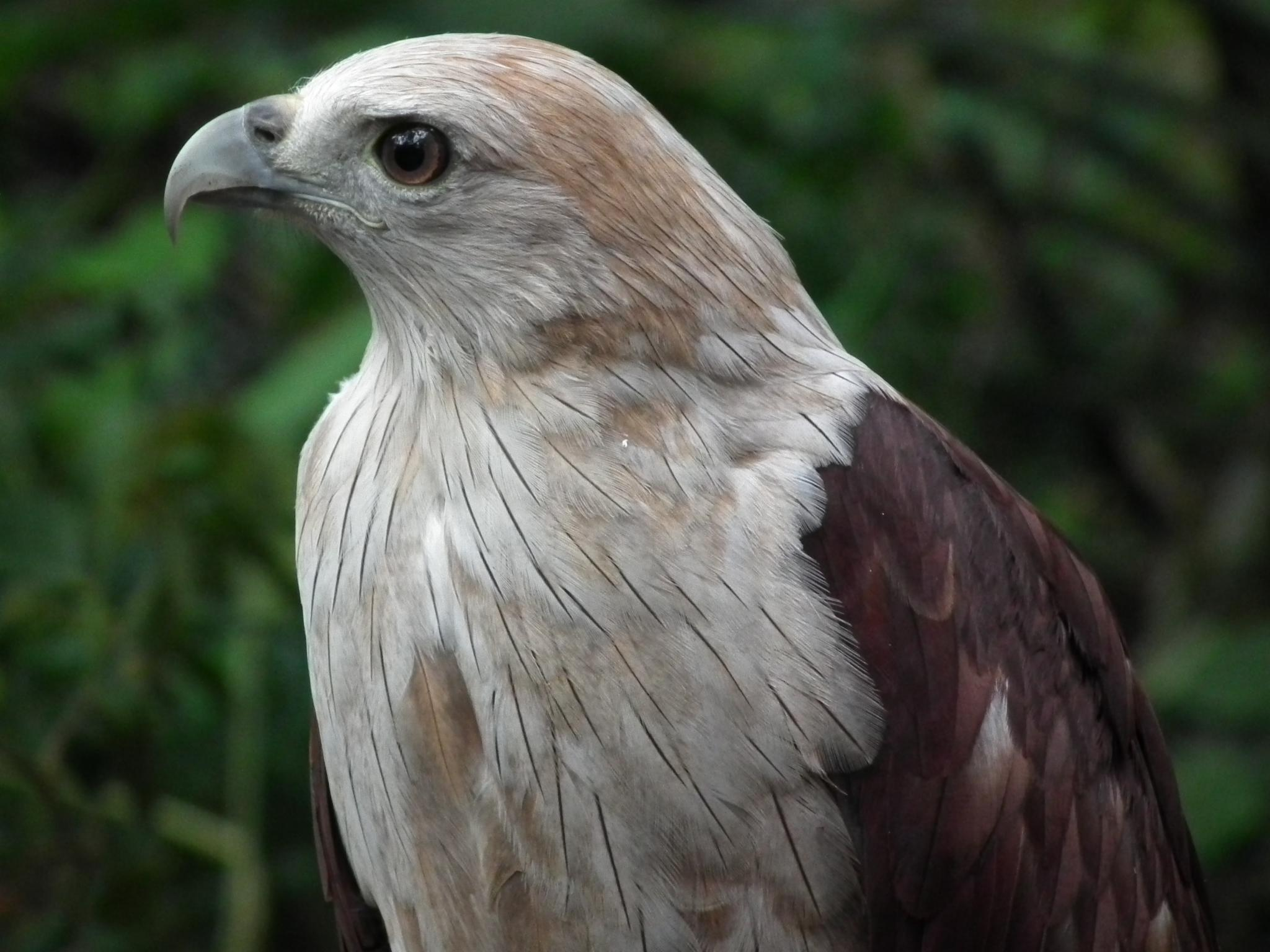
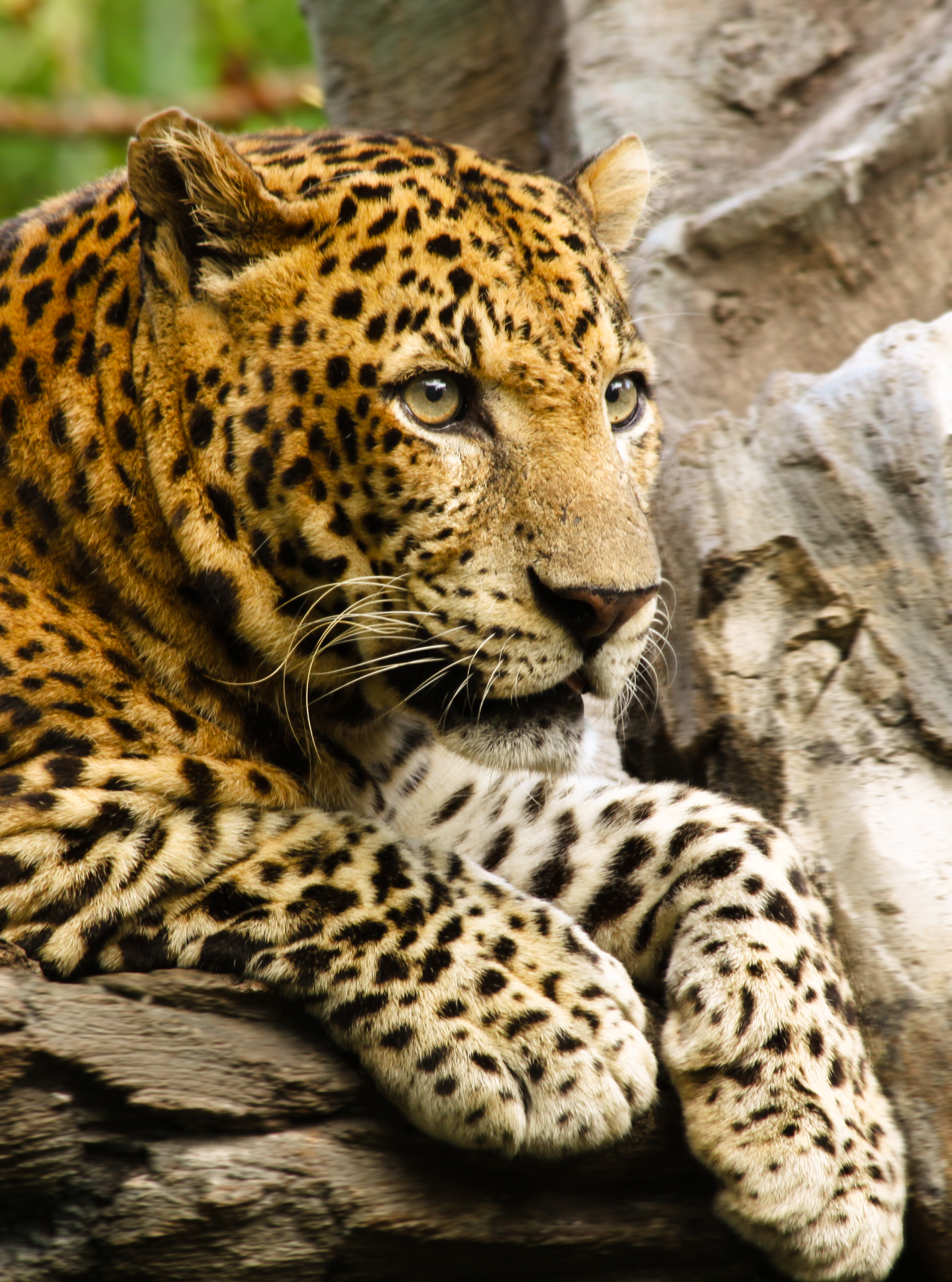
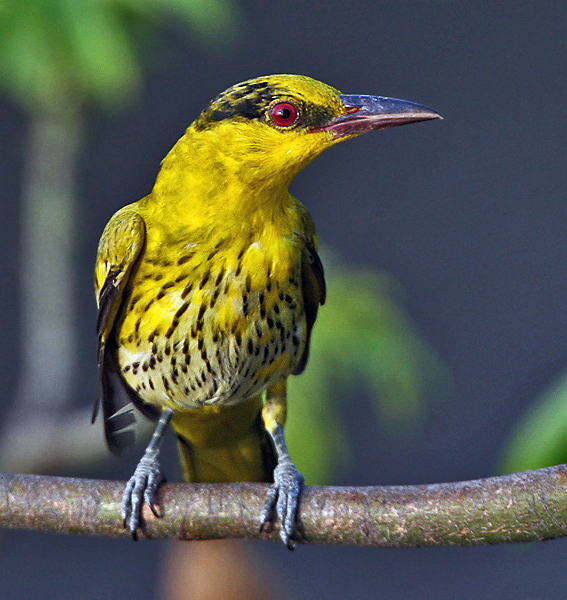
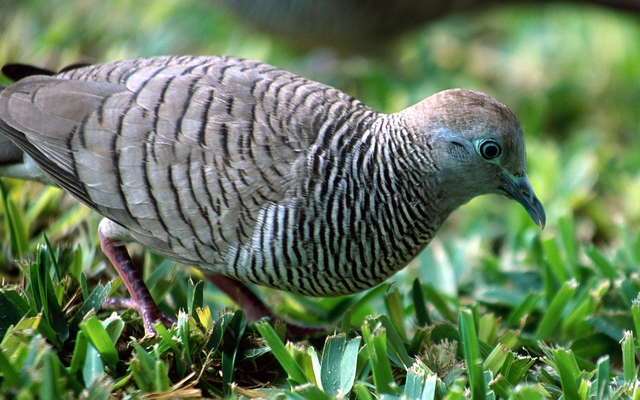
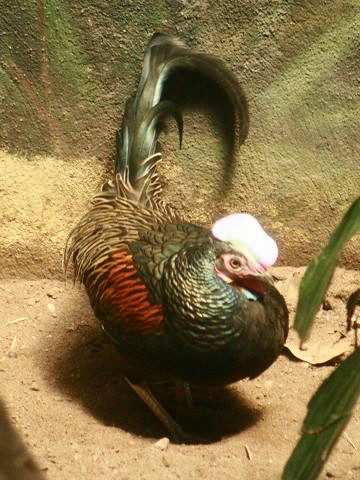
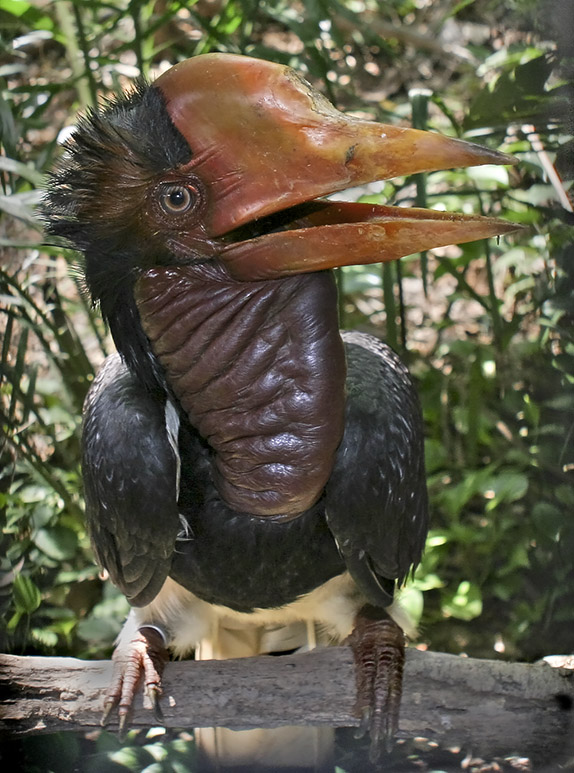
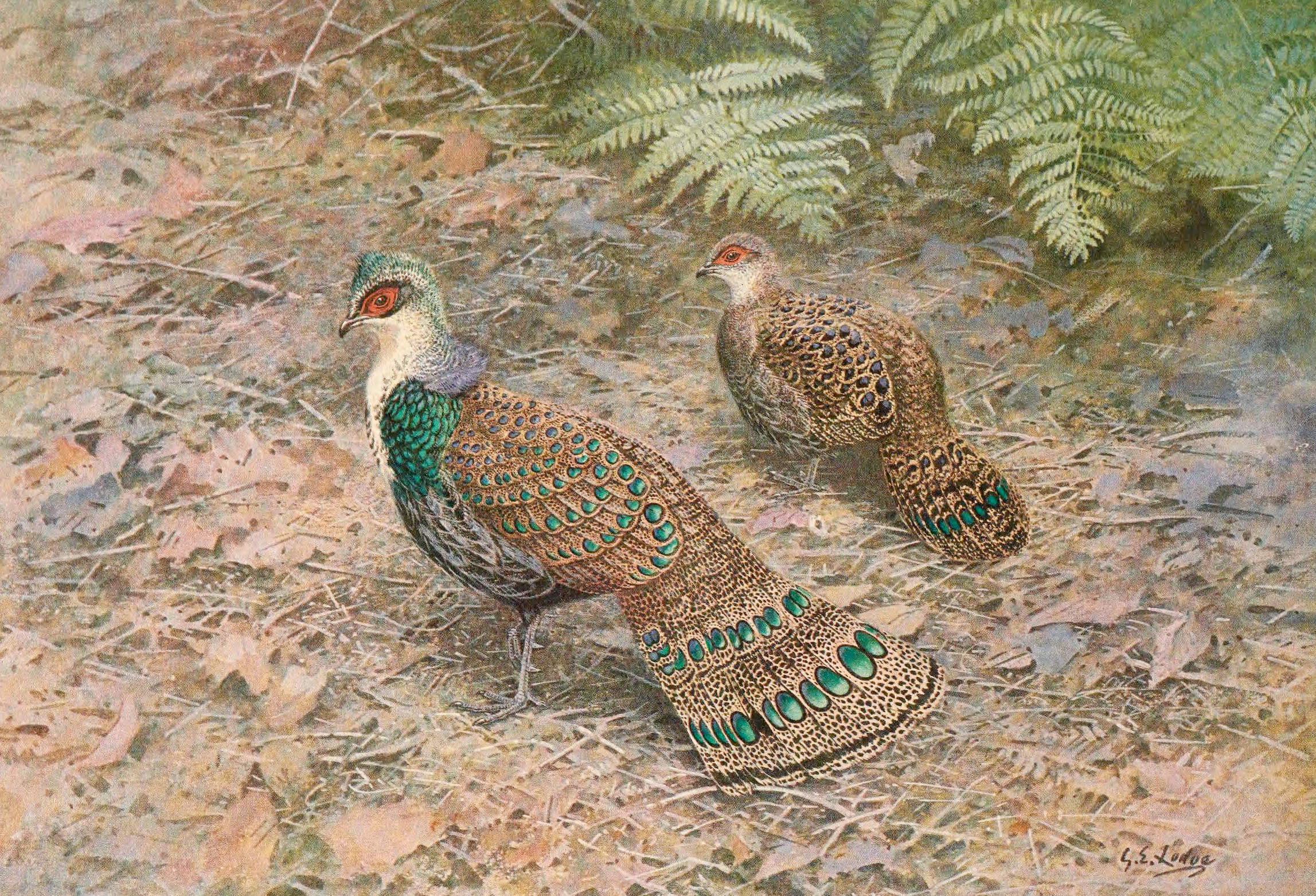
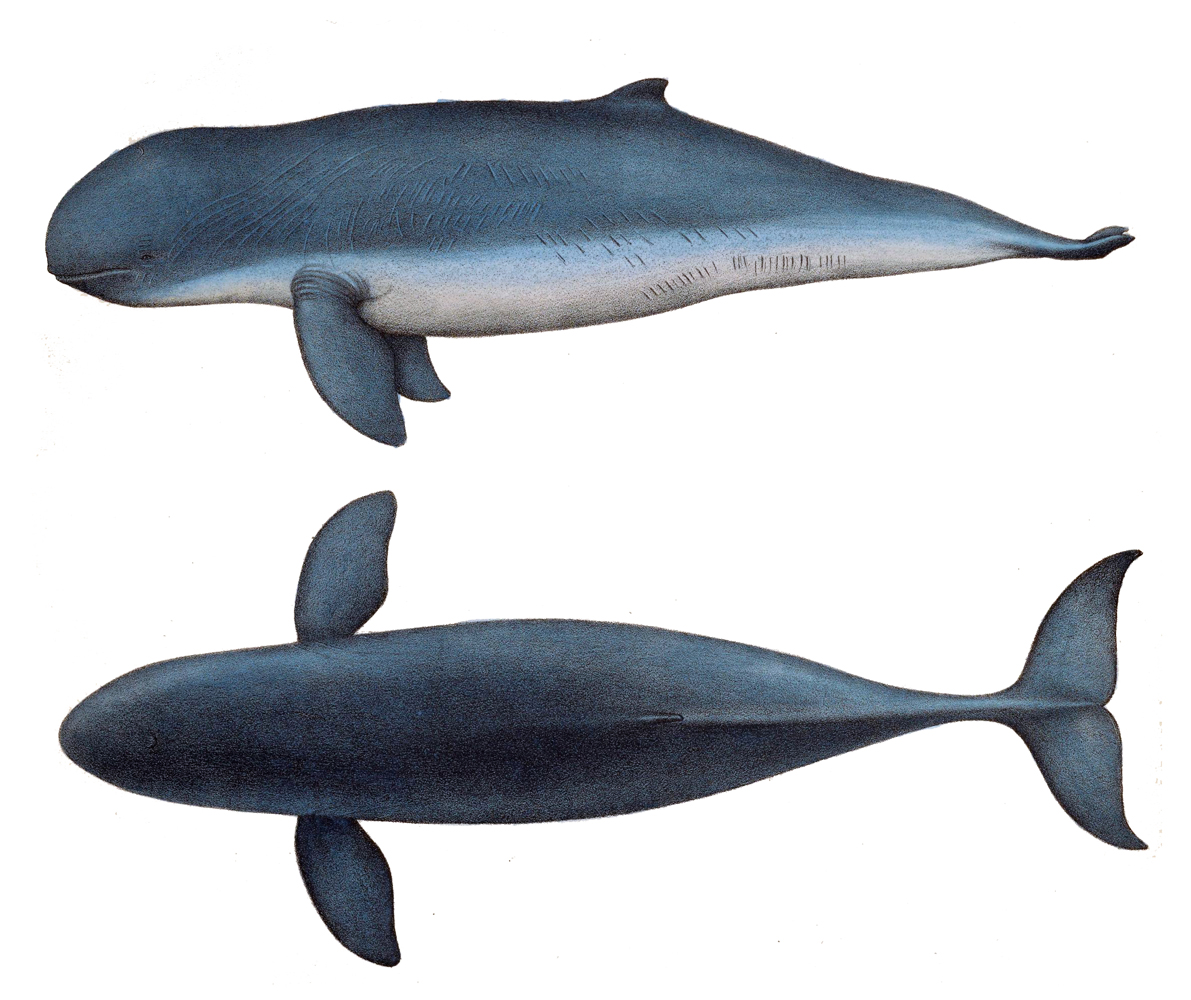
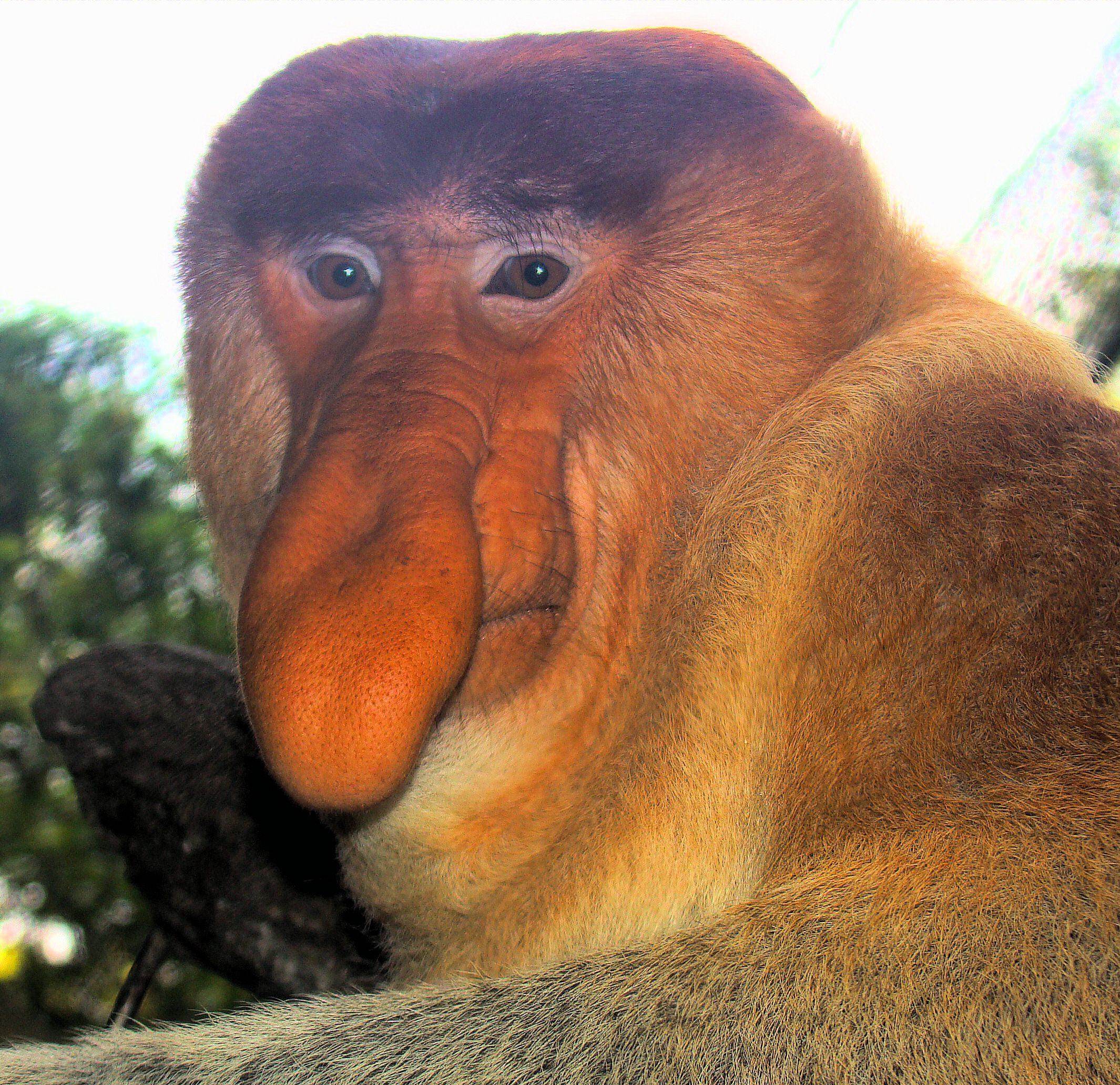
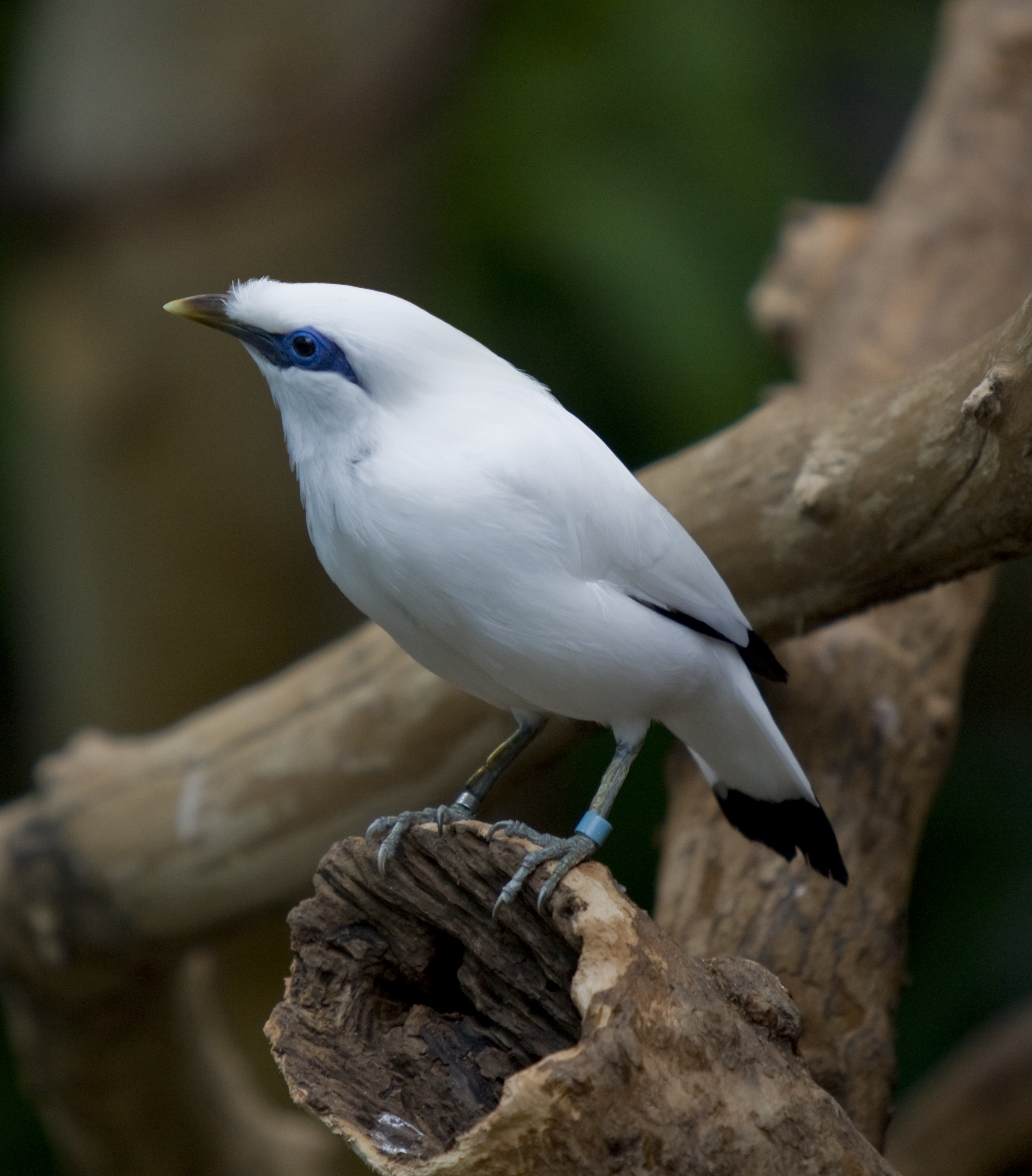
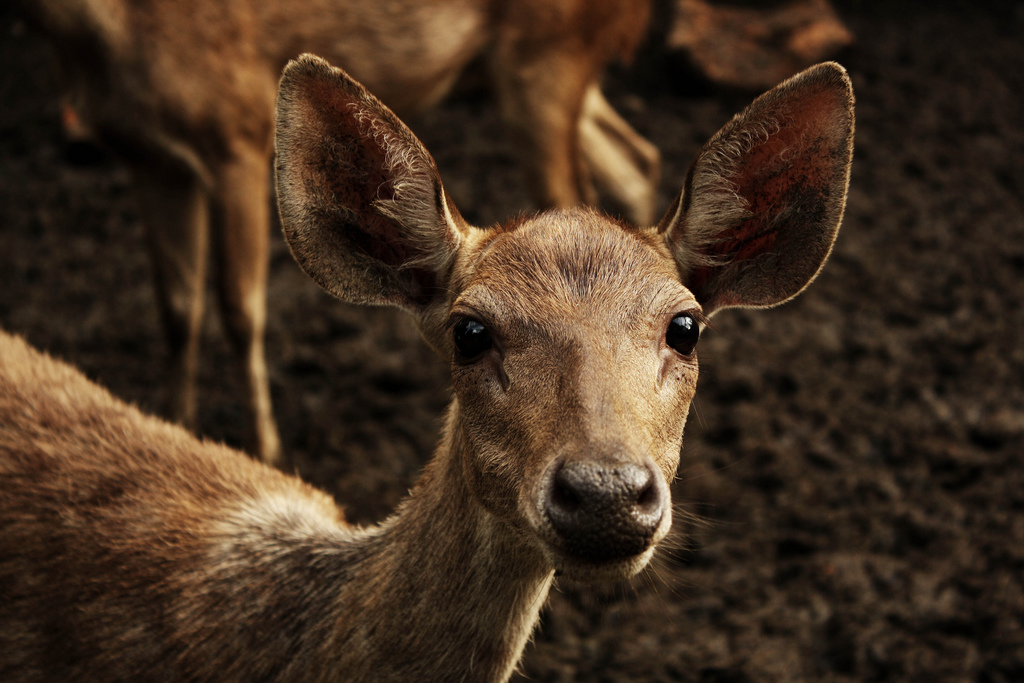
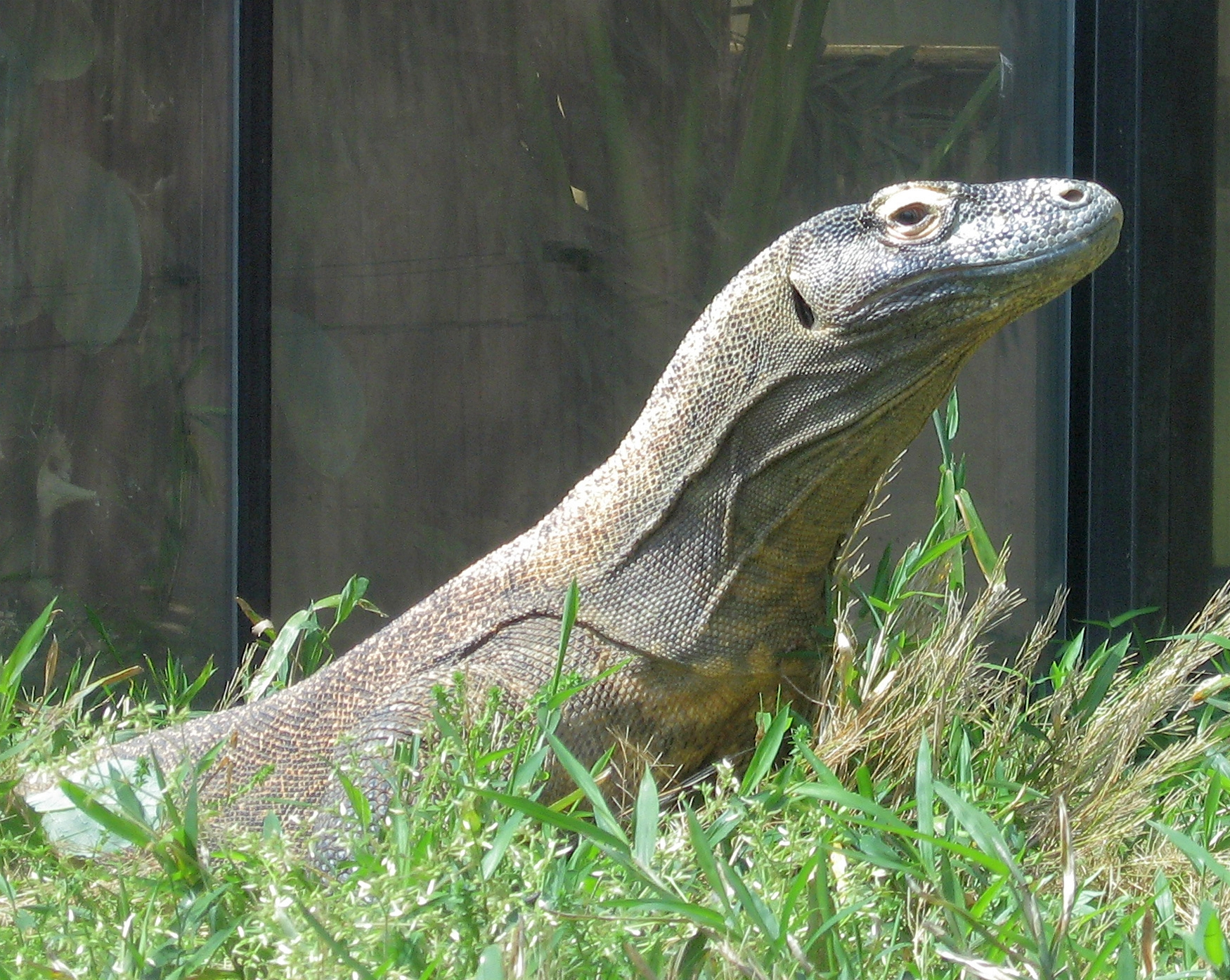
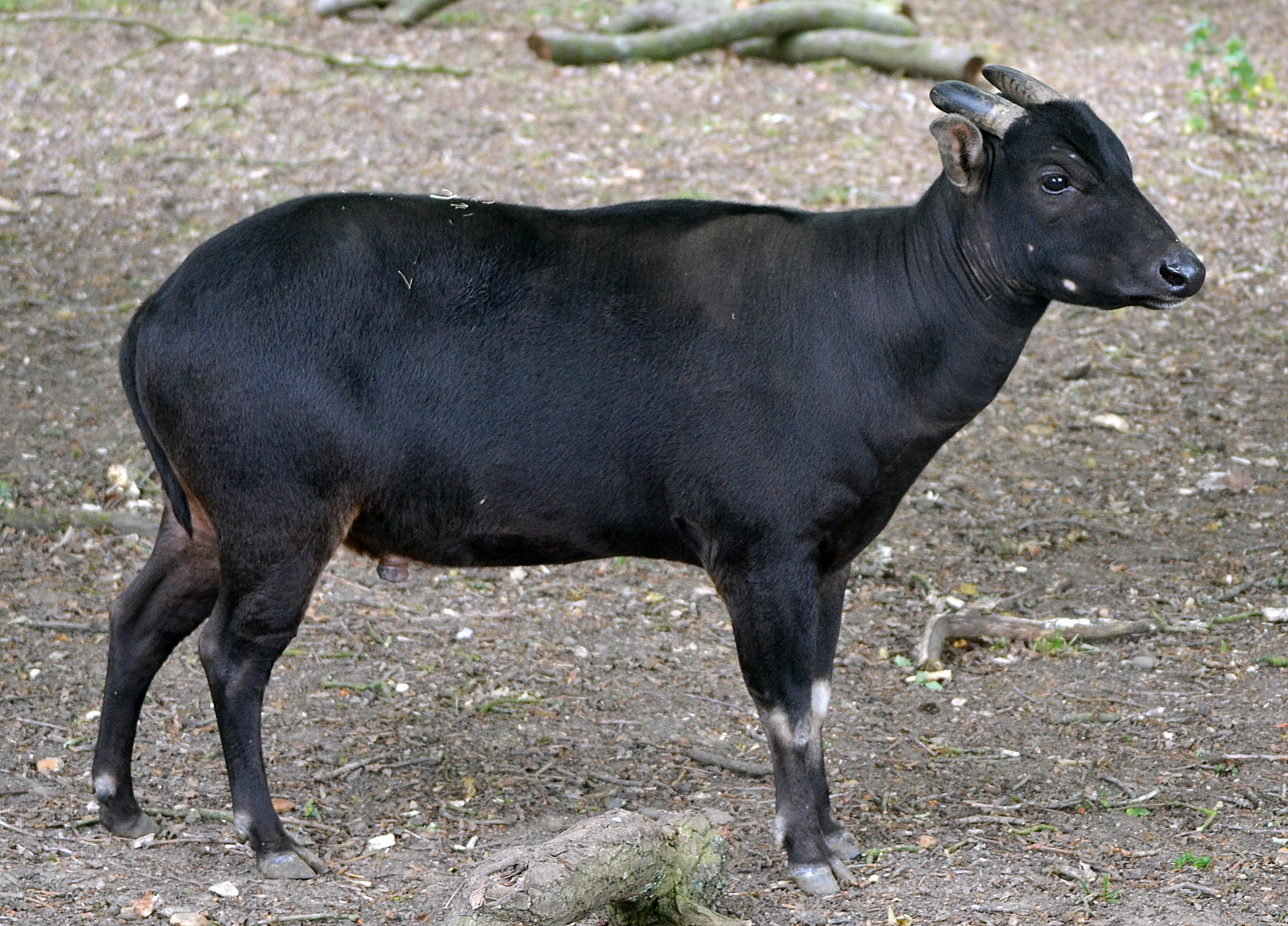
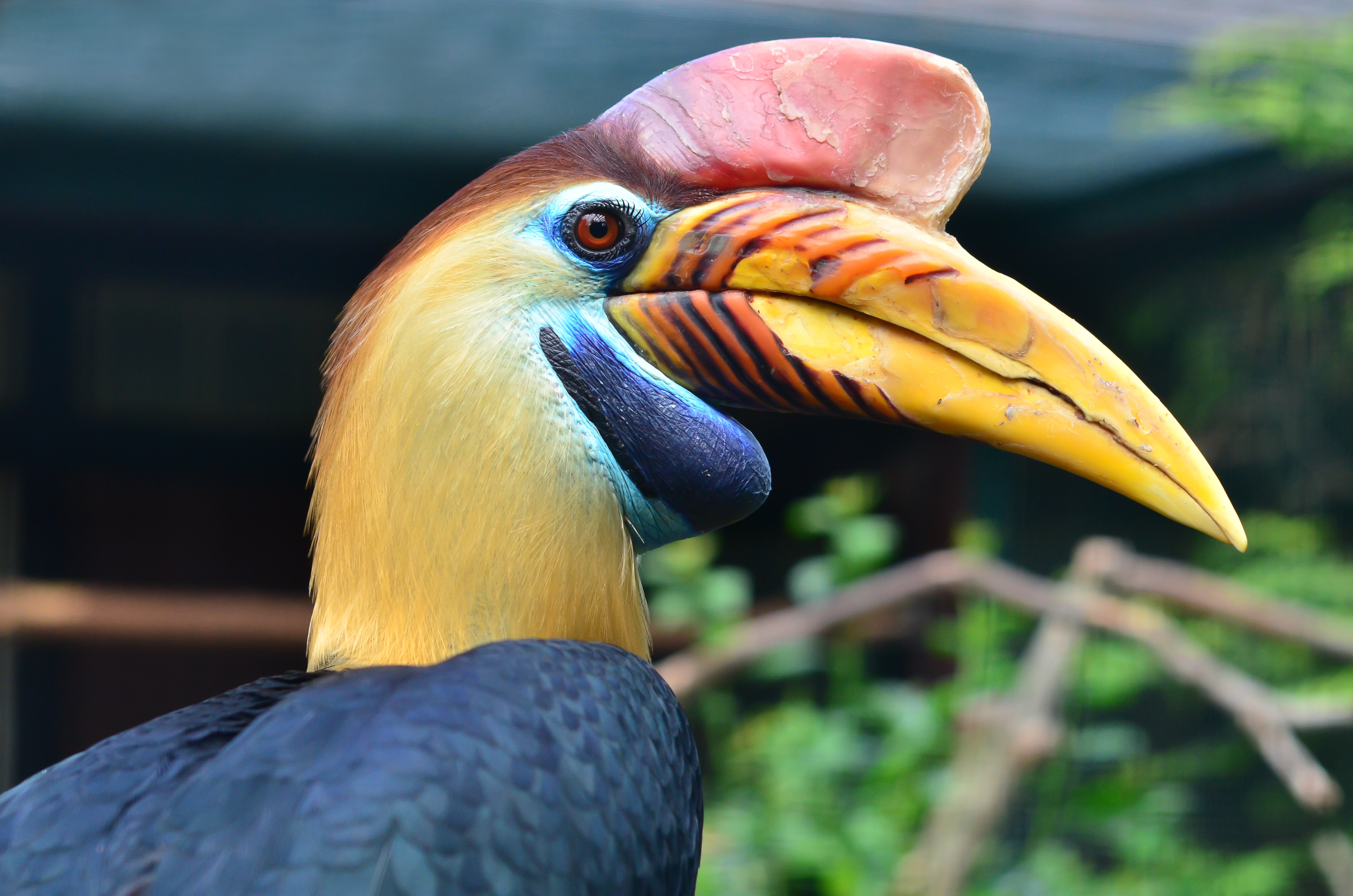
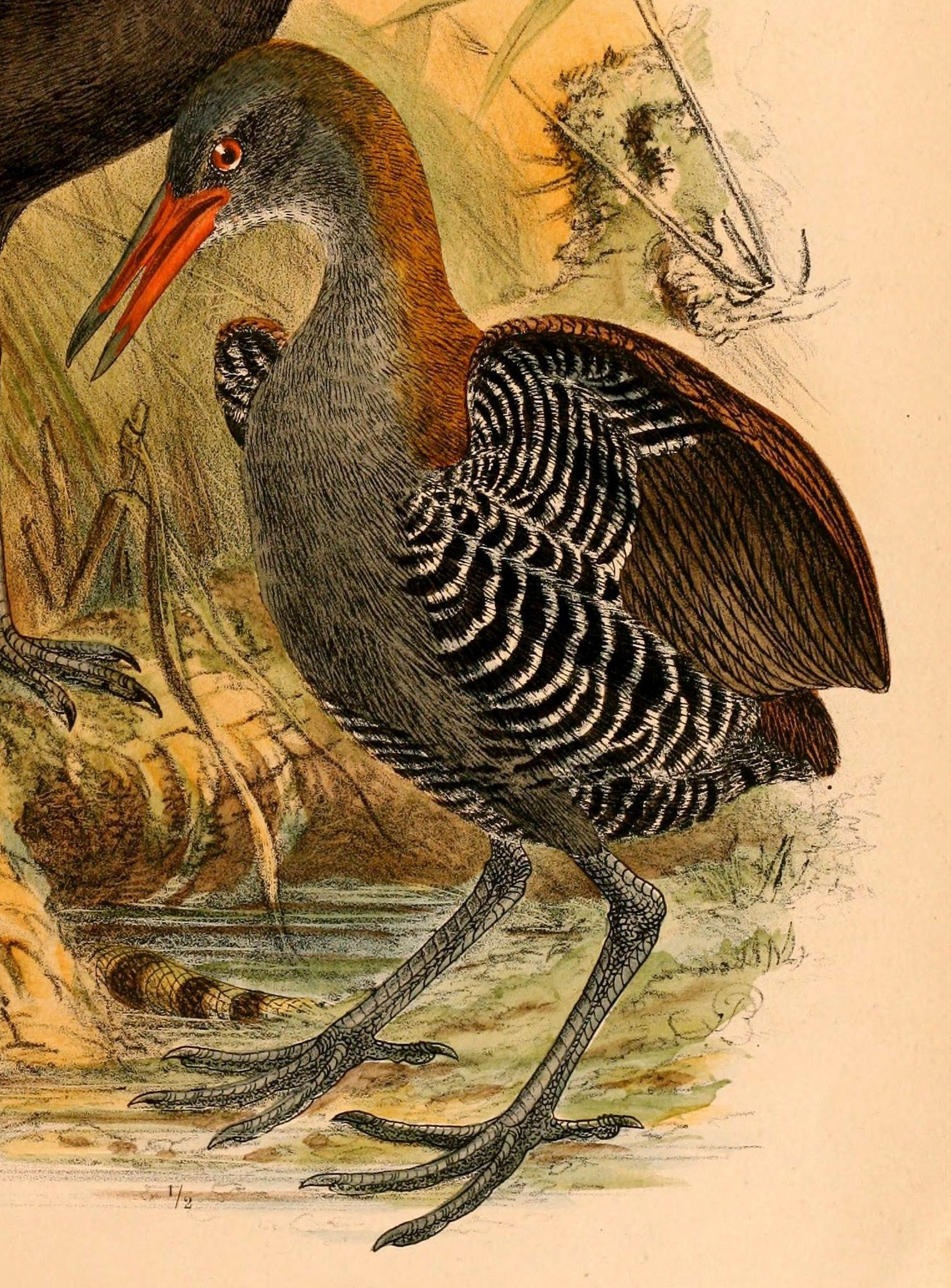
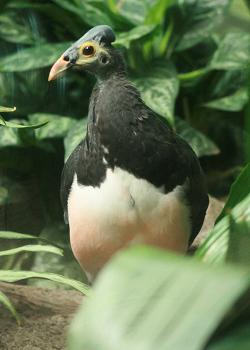
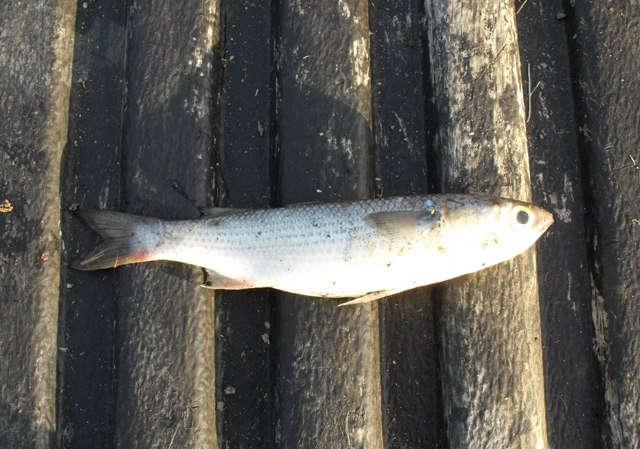
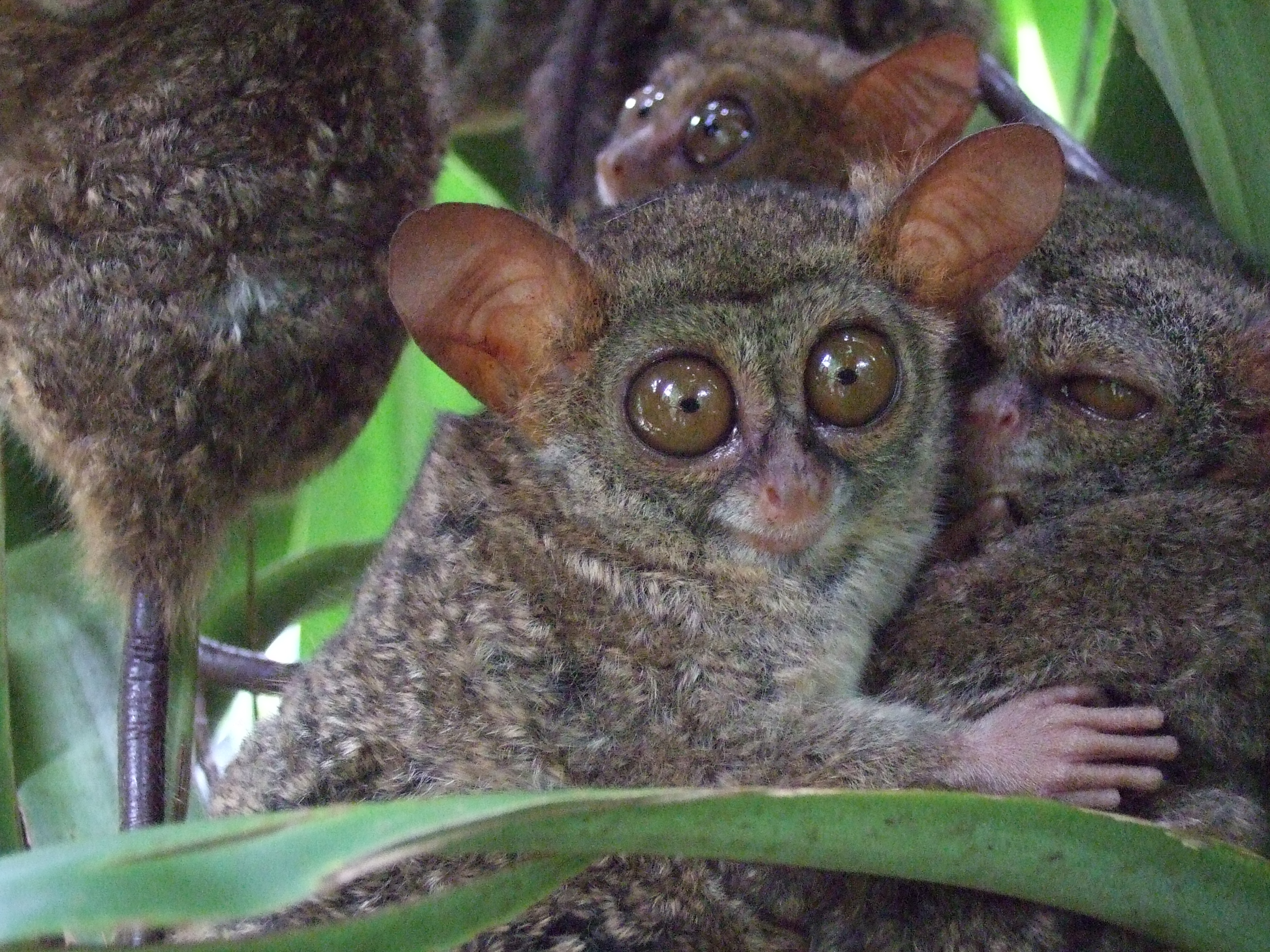
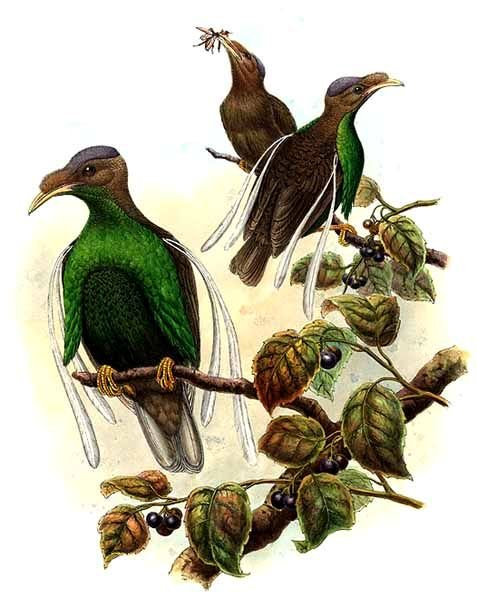
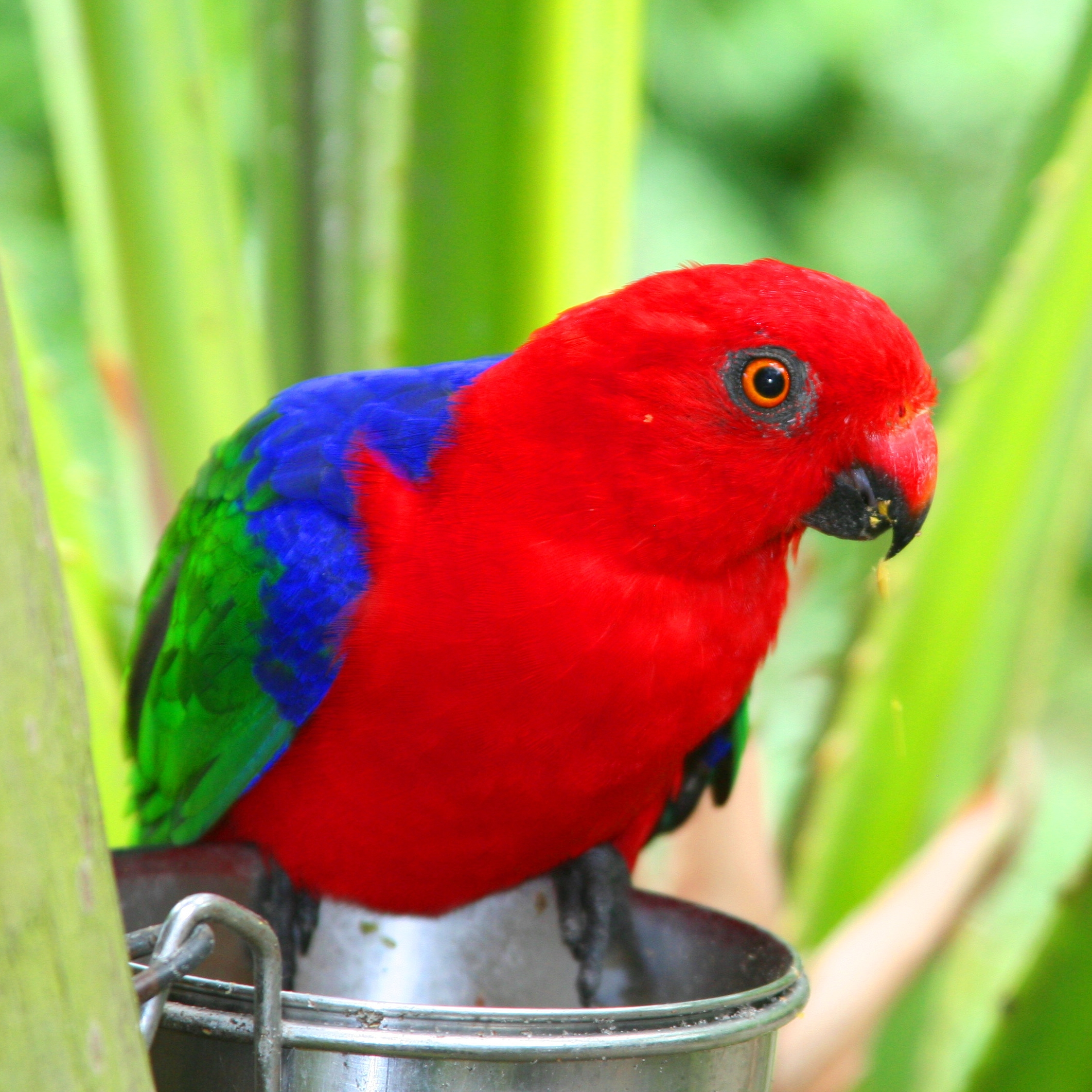
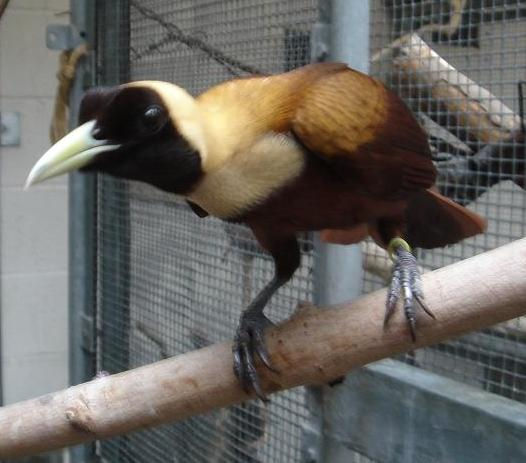
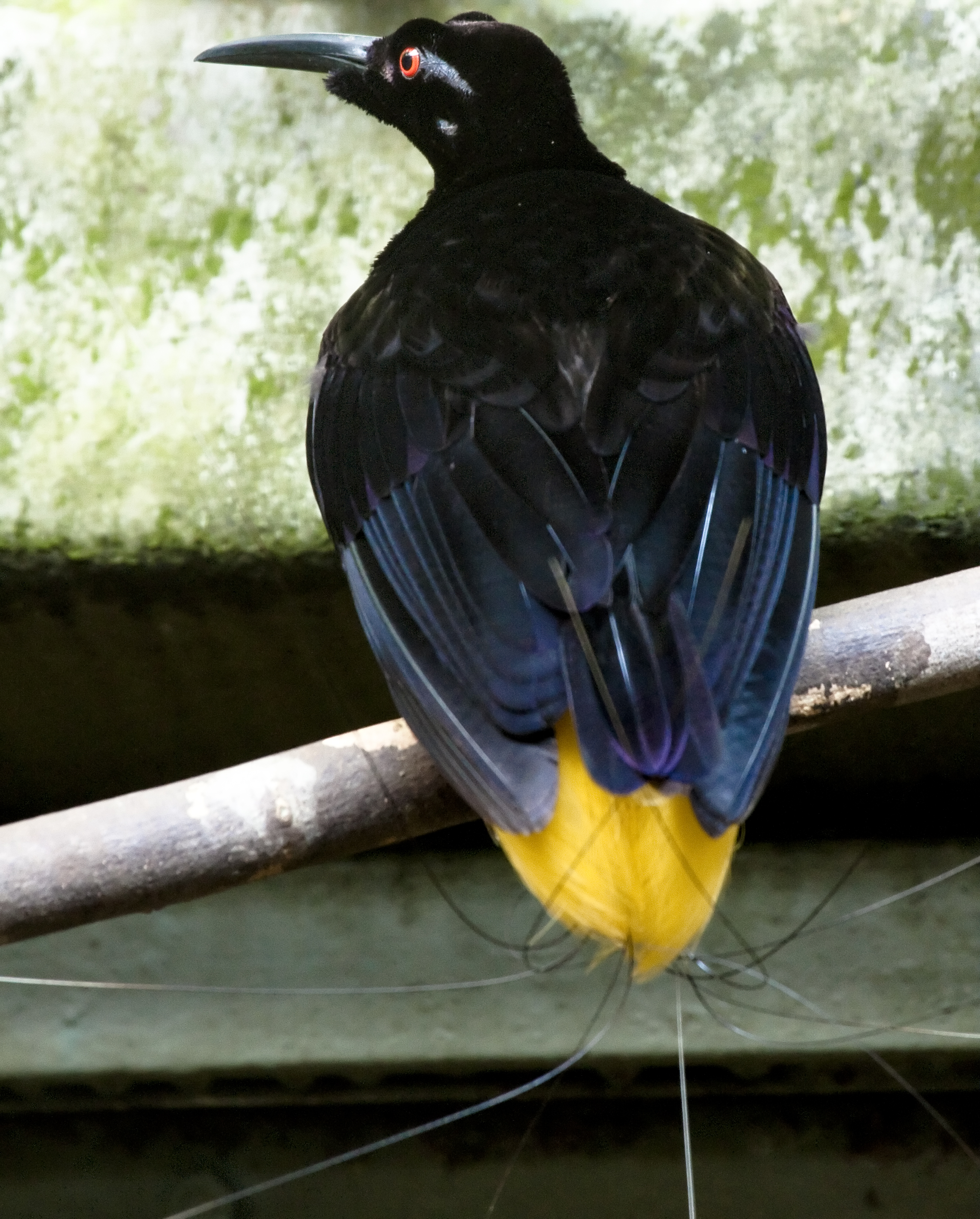
Province	Provincial animal	Picture
Aceh	Rufous-tailed shama
North Sumatra	Nias myna
West Sumatra	Great argus
Riau	Blue-crowned hanging parrot
Riau Islands	Humphead snapper
Jambi	Sumatran tiger
South Sumatra	Giant featherback
(Bangka Belitung Islands) Bangka–Belitung Islands	Horsfield's tarsier
Bengkulu	Sun bear
Lampung	Sumatran elephant
Banten	Javan rhinoceros
Jakarta	Brahminy kite
West Java	Javan leopard
Central Java	Black-naped oriole
Special Region of Yogyakarta	Zebra dove
East Java	Bekisar
West Kalimantan	Helmeted hornbill
Central Kalimantan	Bornean peacock-pheasant
East Kalimantan	Irrawaddy dolphin
South Kalimantan	Proboscis monkey
Bali	Bali starling
West Nusa Tenggara	Sunda deer
East Nusa Tenggara	Komodo dragon
(Southeast Sulawesi) South East Sulawesi	Anoa
South Sulawesi	Knobbed hornbill
West Sulawesi	Snoring rail
Central Sulawesi	Maleo
Gorontalo	Dussumier's mullet
North Sulawesi	Spectral tarsier
North Maluku	Standardwing
(Maluku (province)) Maluku	Moluccan king parrot
(West Papua (province)) West Papua	Red bird-of-paradise
(Papua (province)) Papua	Twelve-wired bird-of-paradise

=== Italy ===
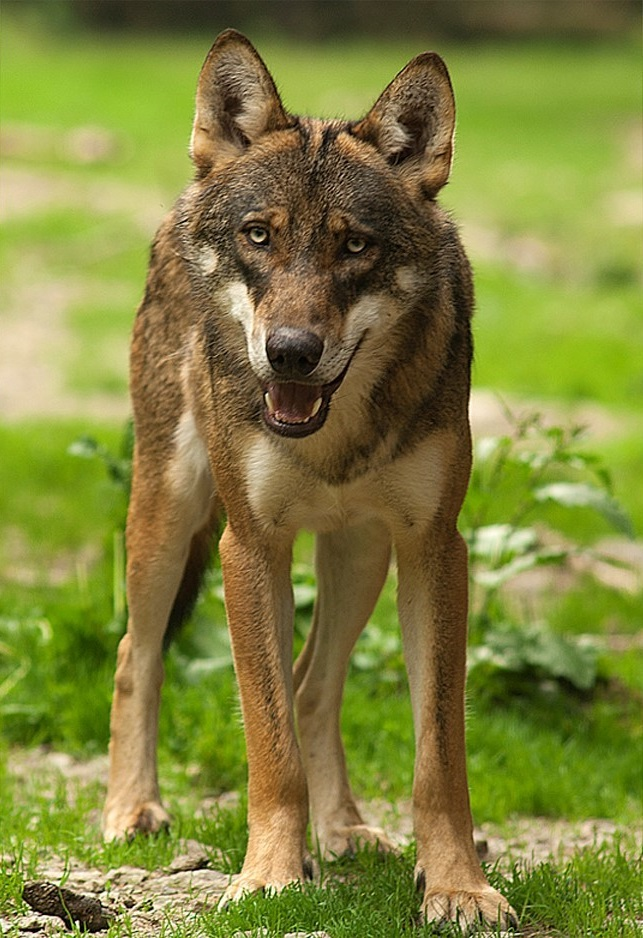
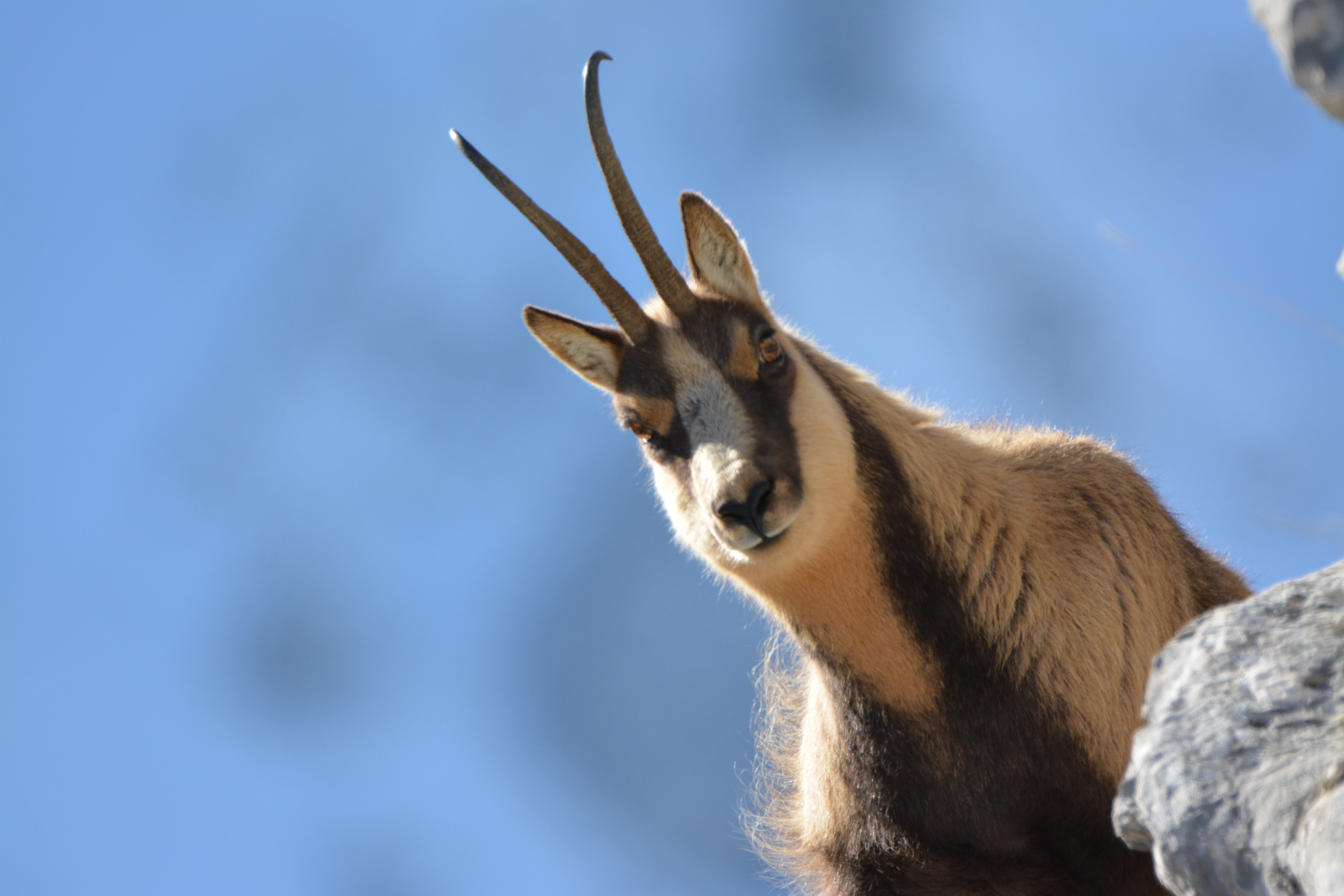
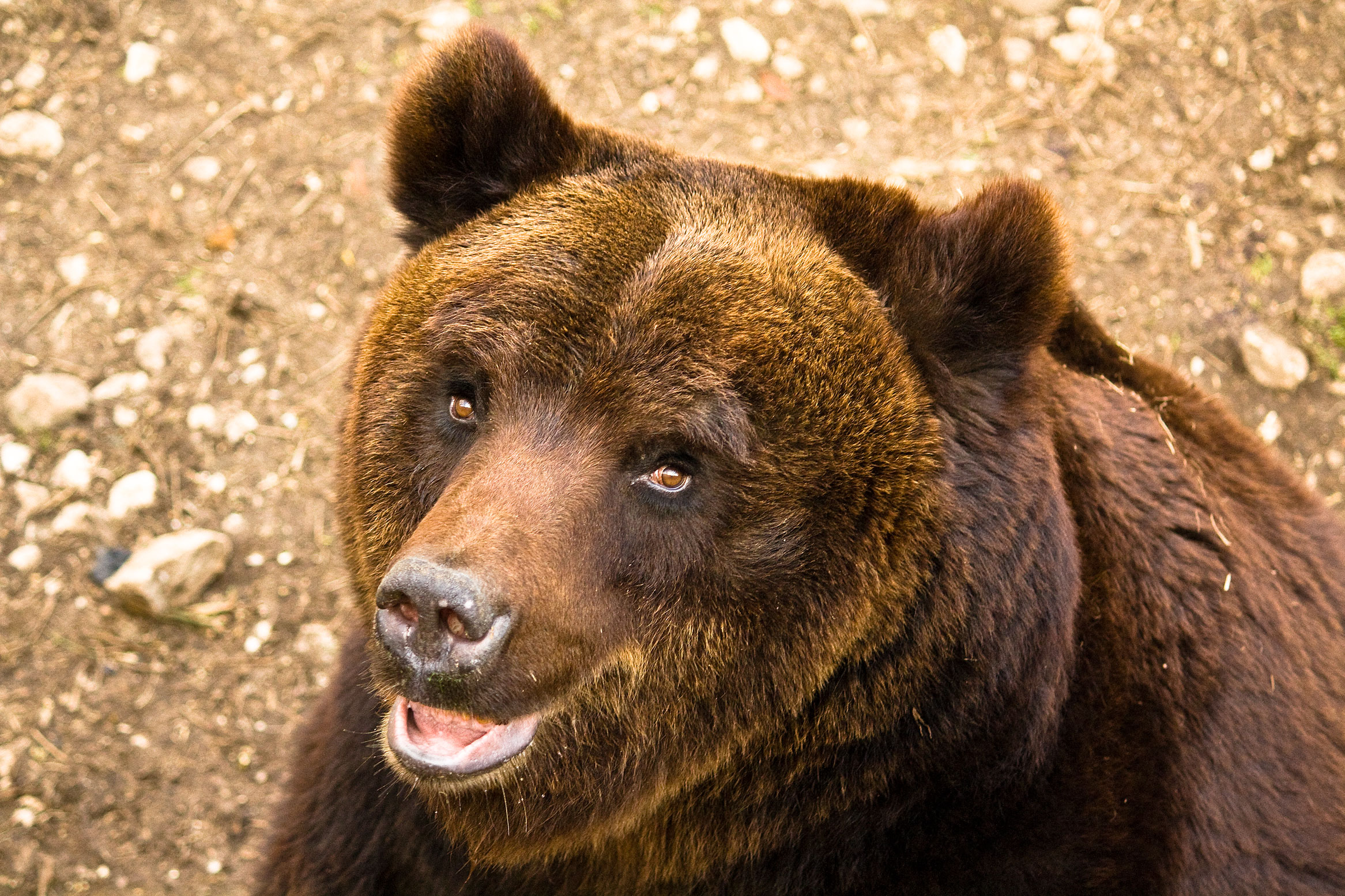
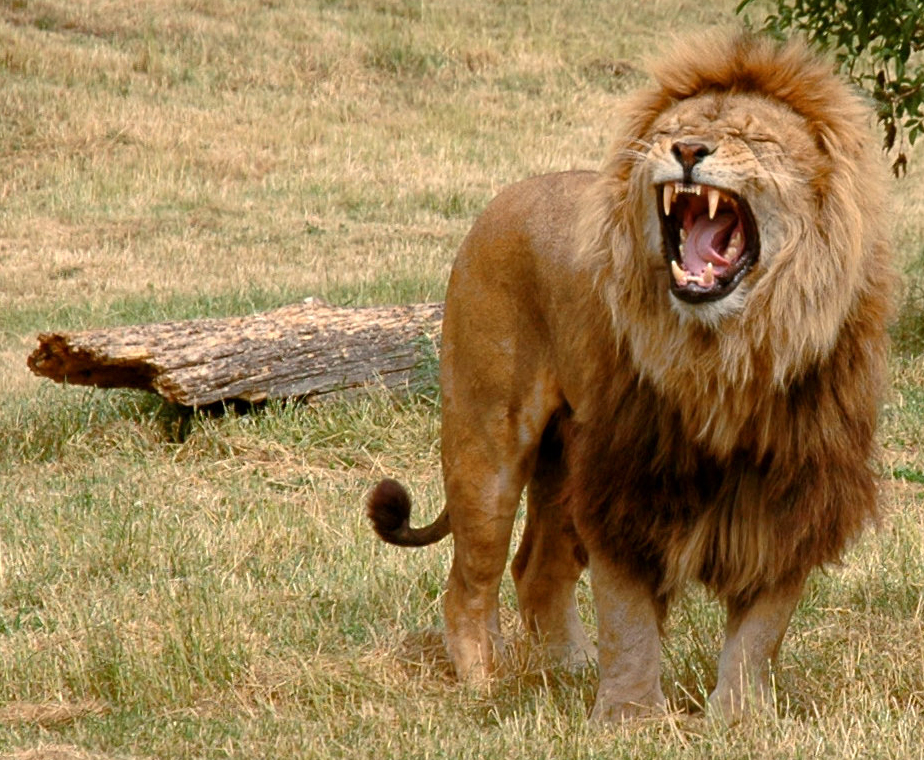
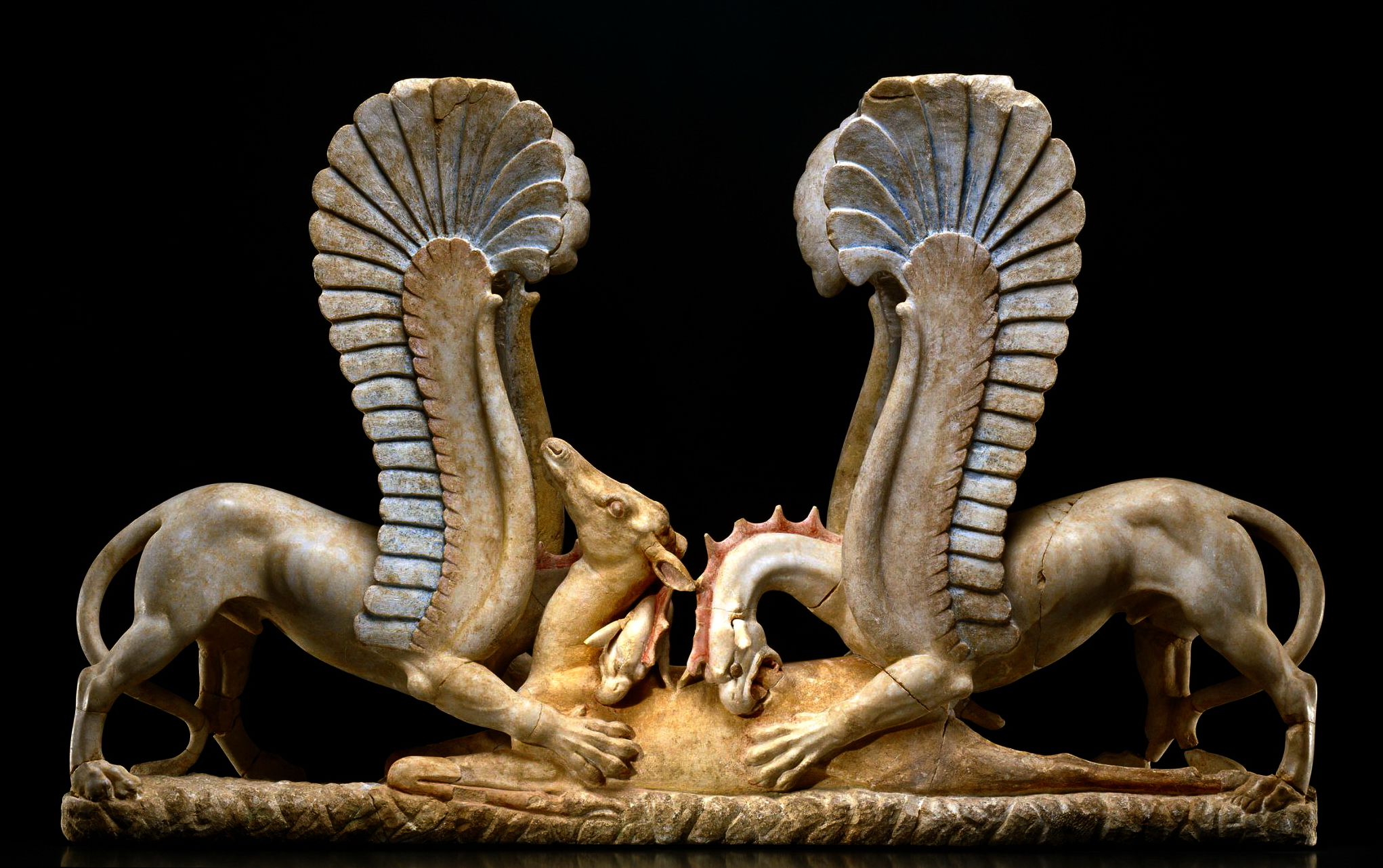
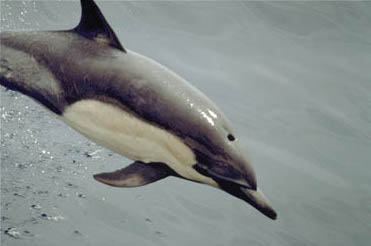
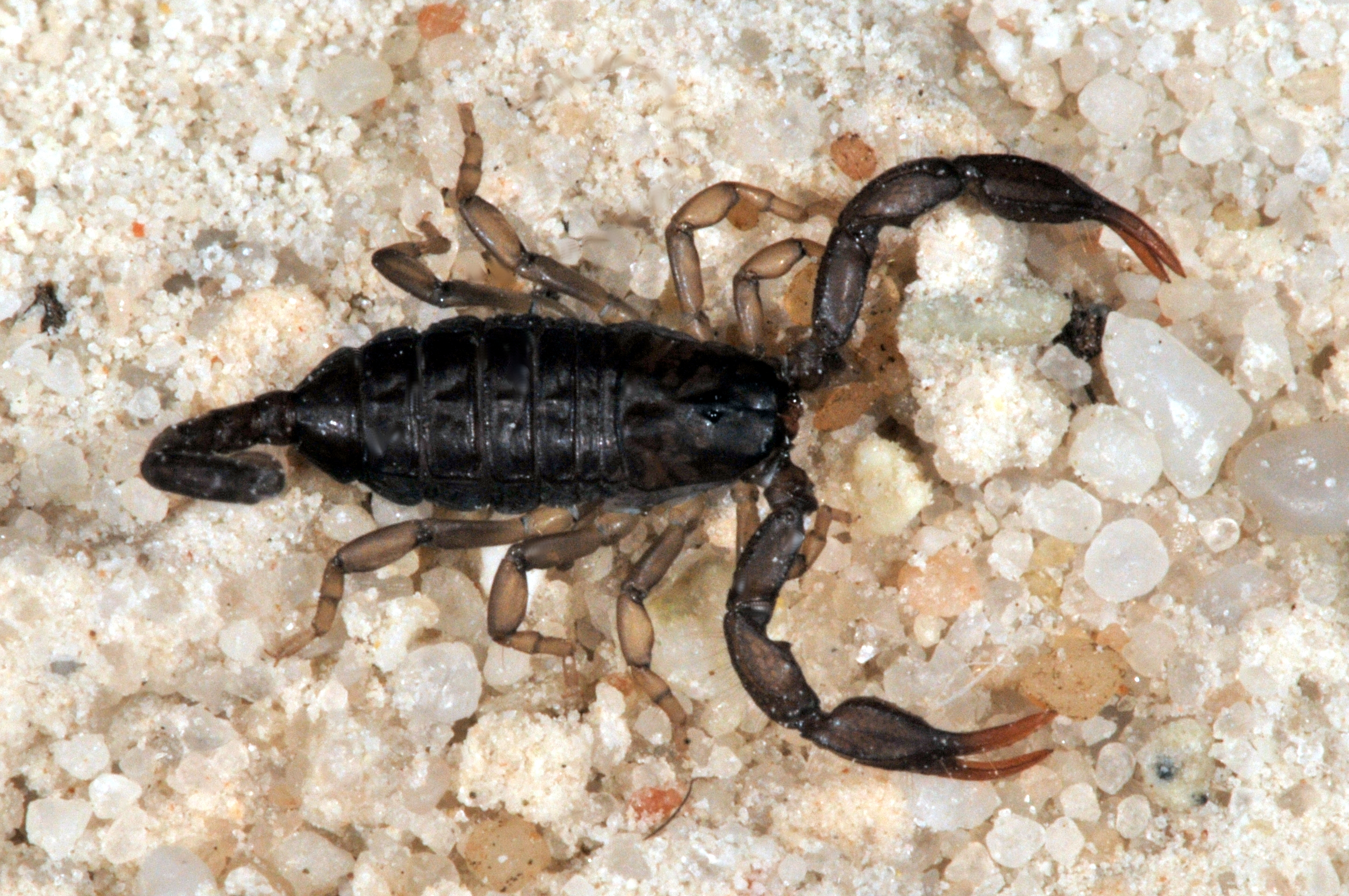
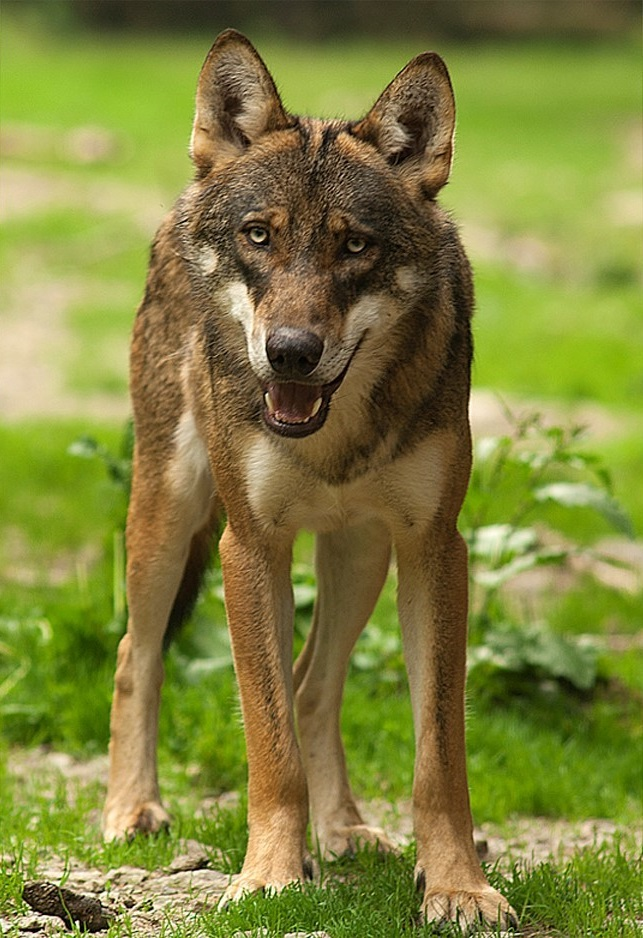
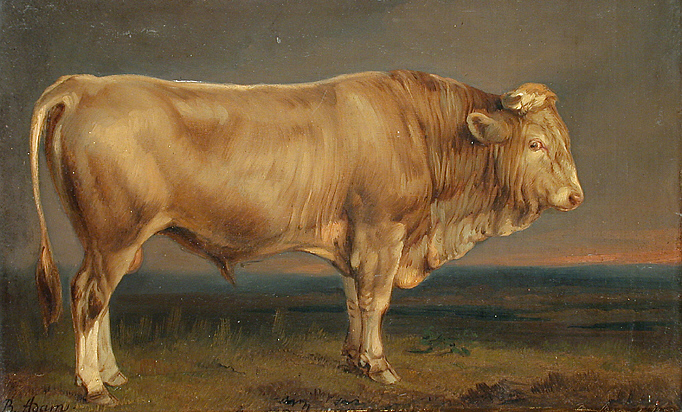
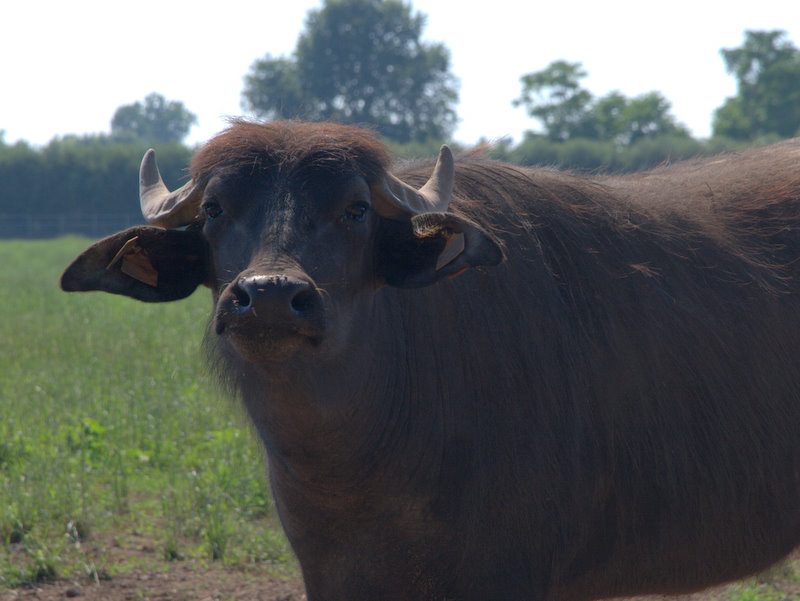
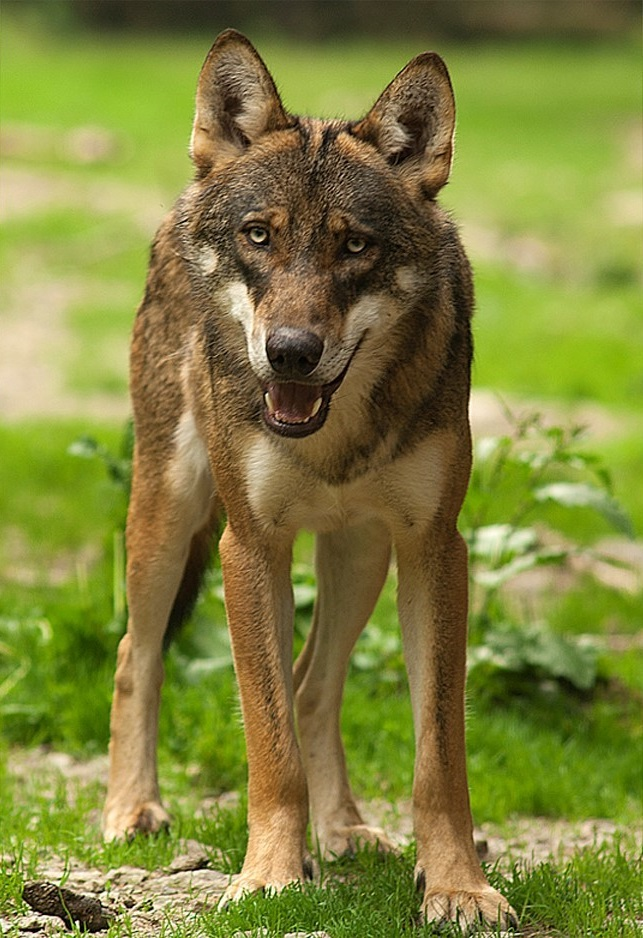
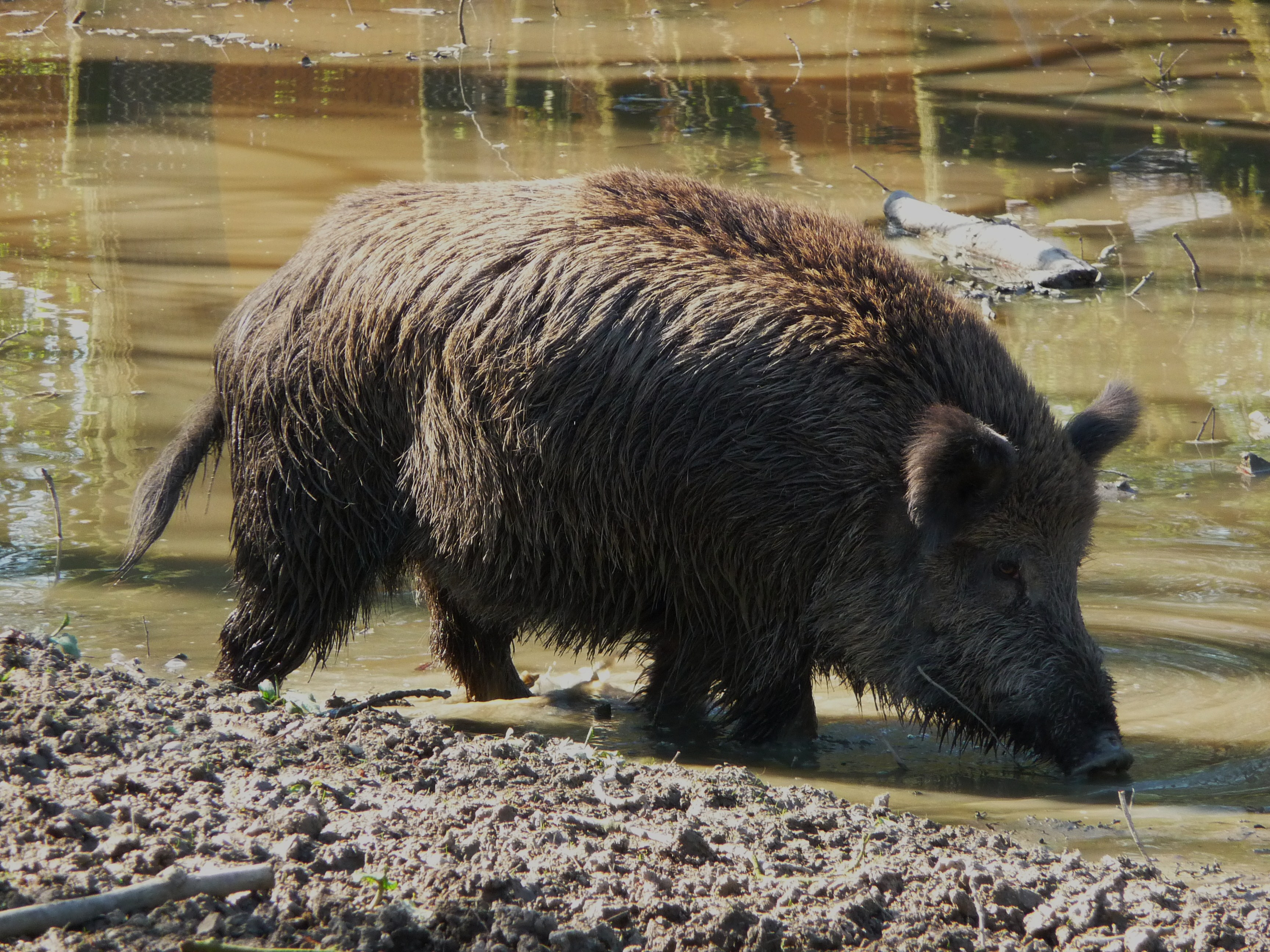
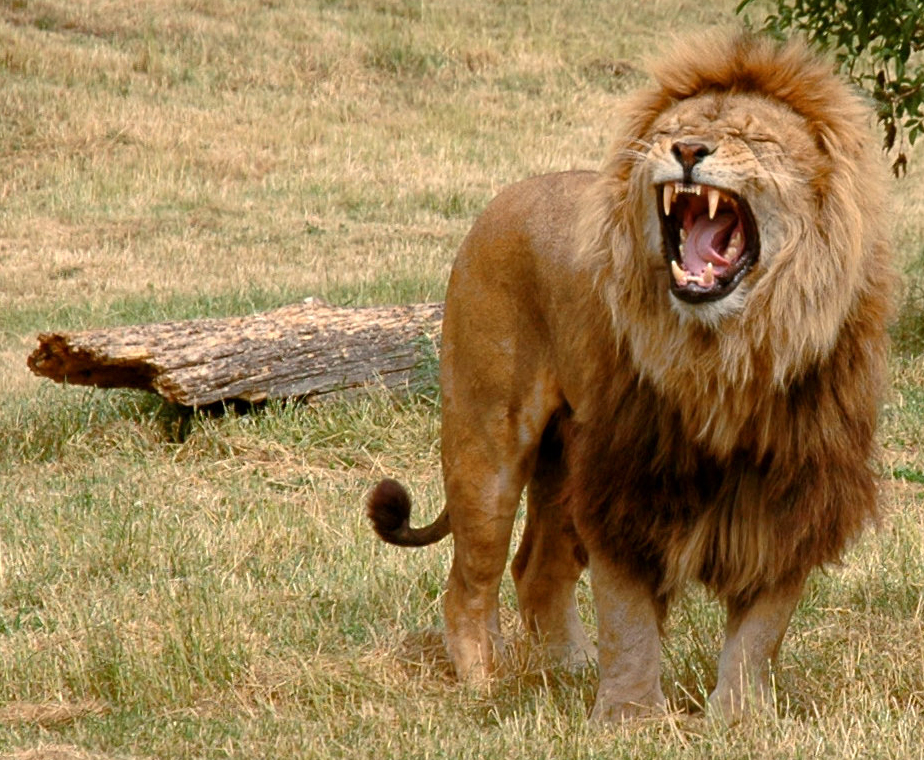
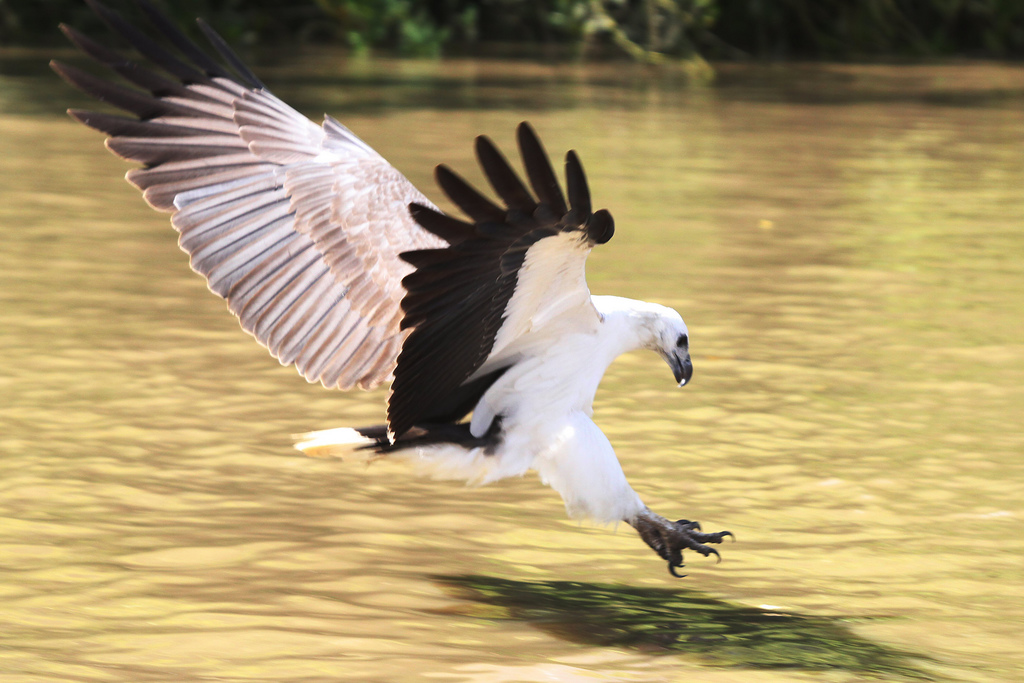
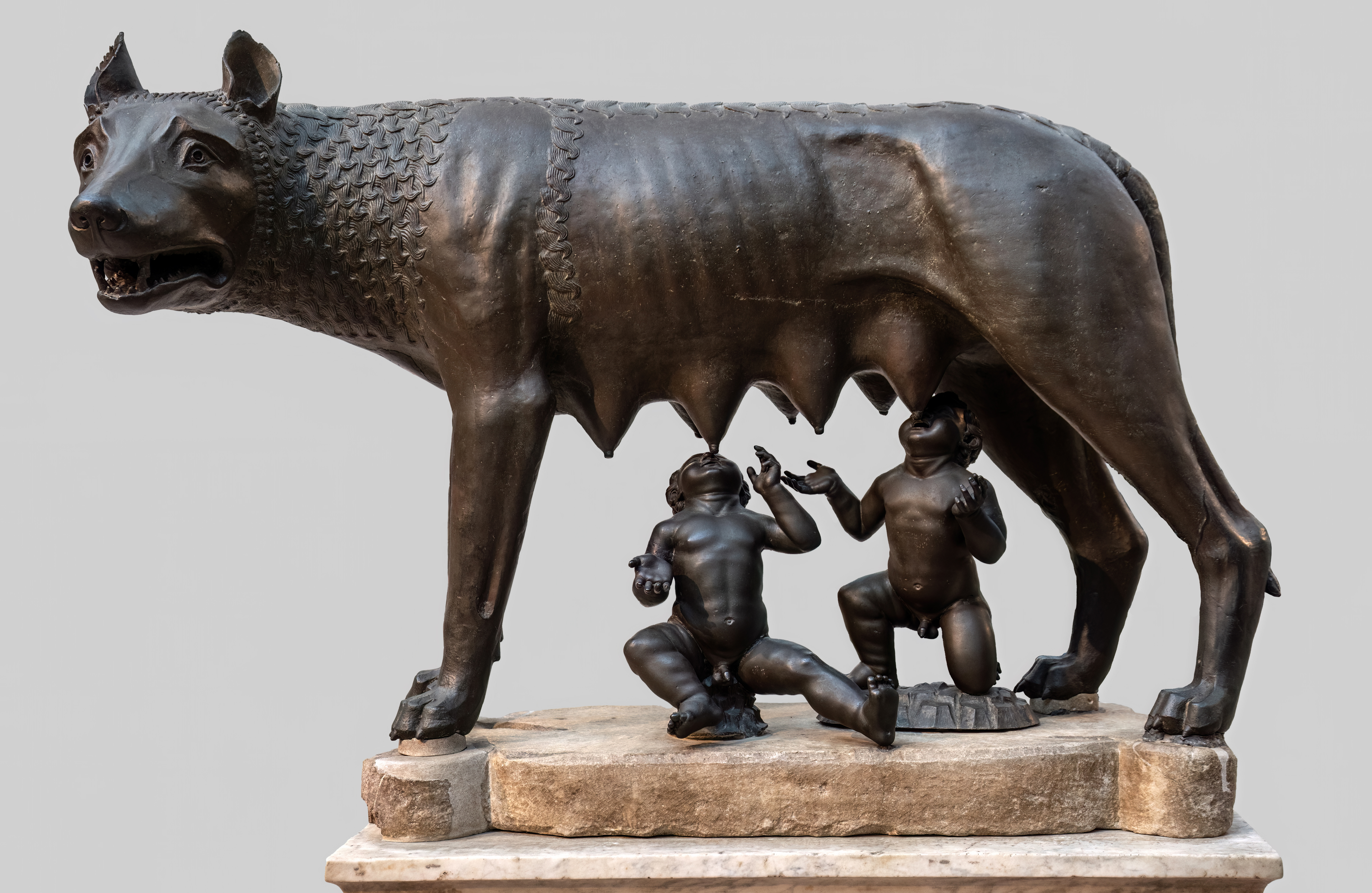
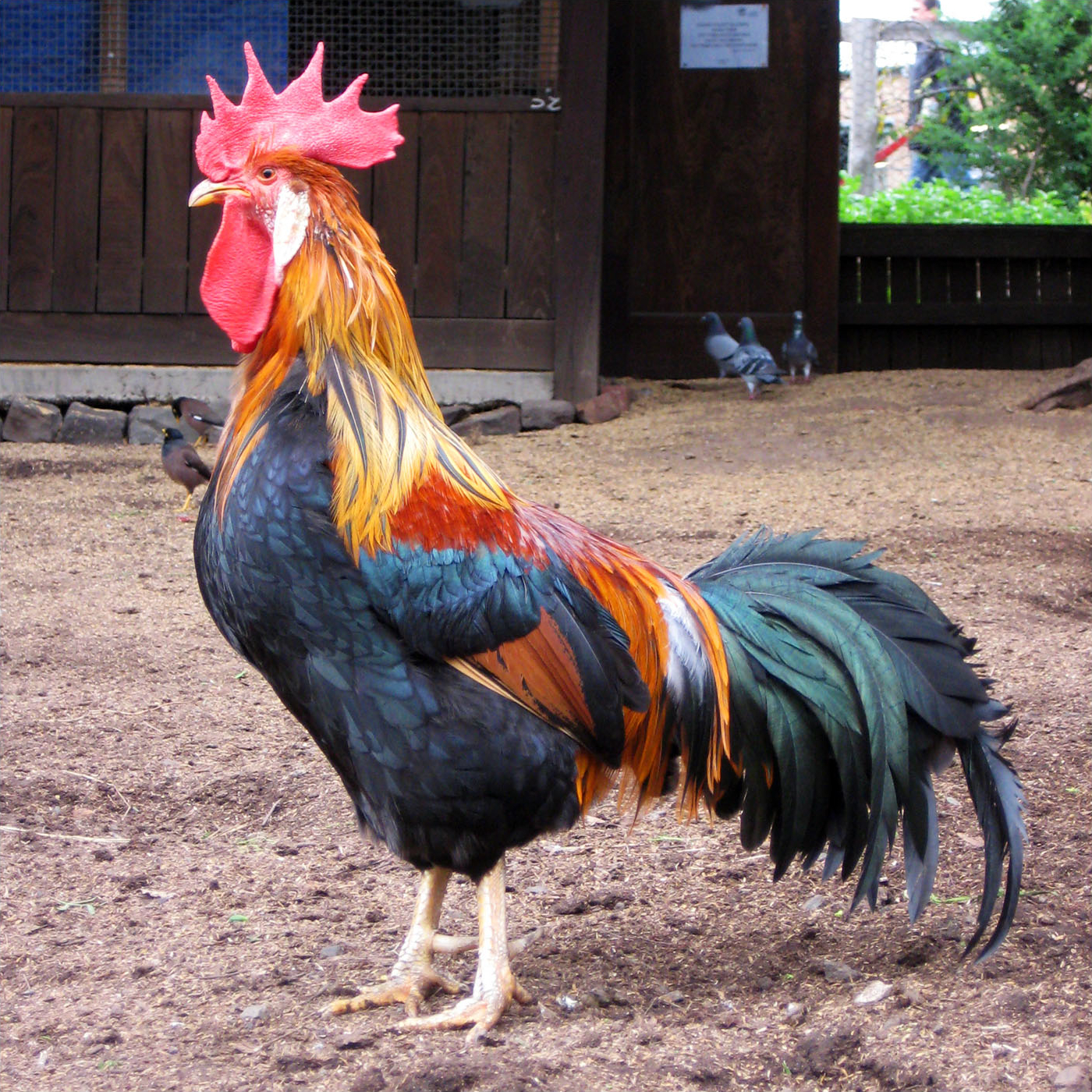
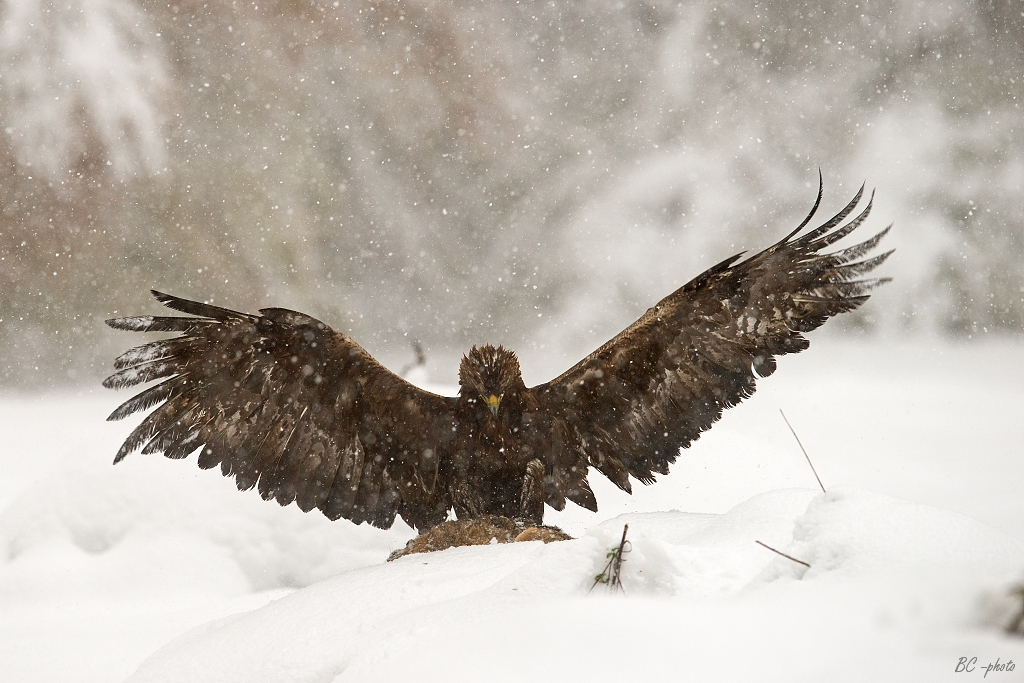
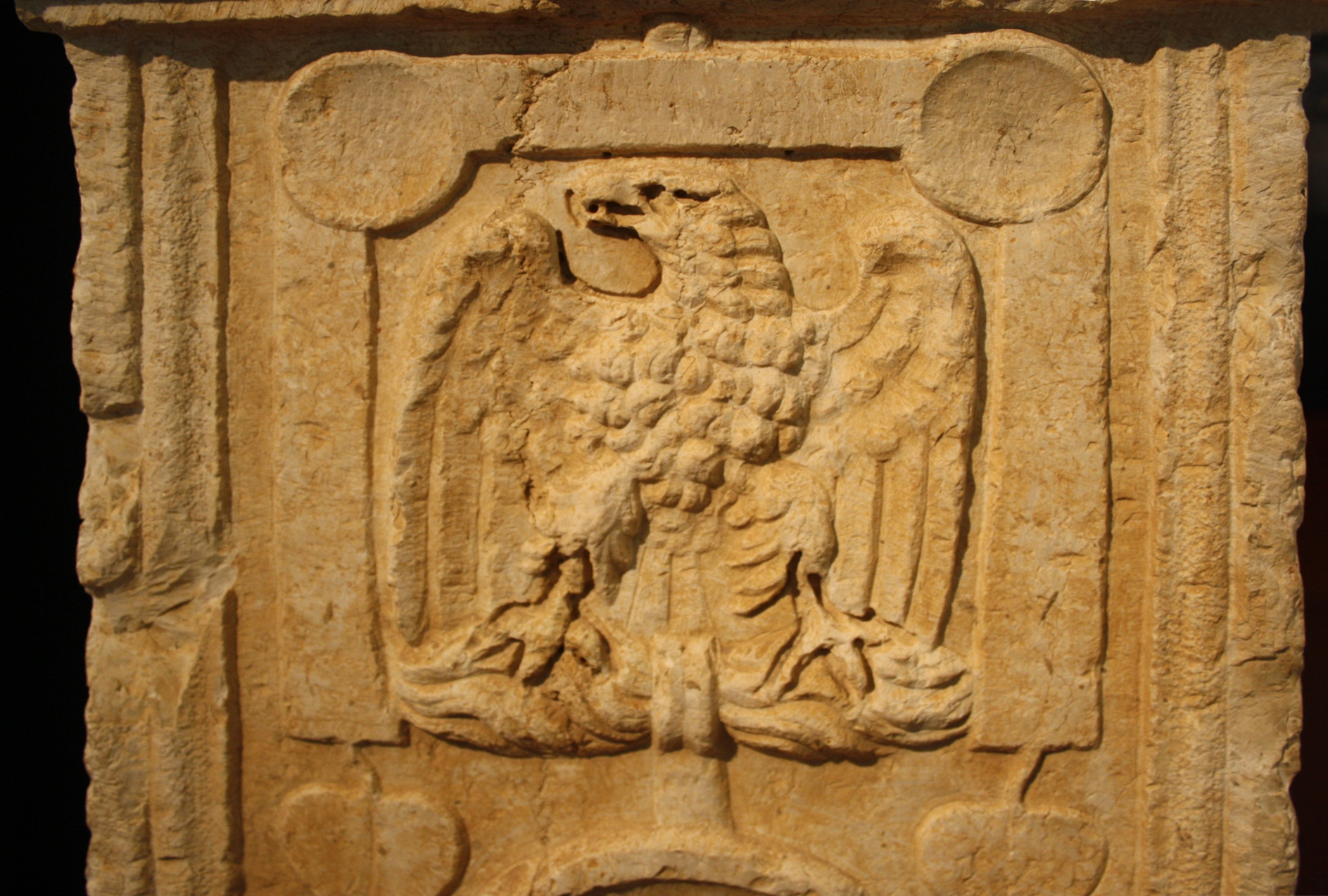
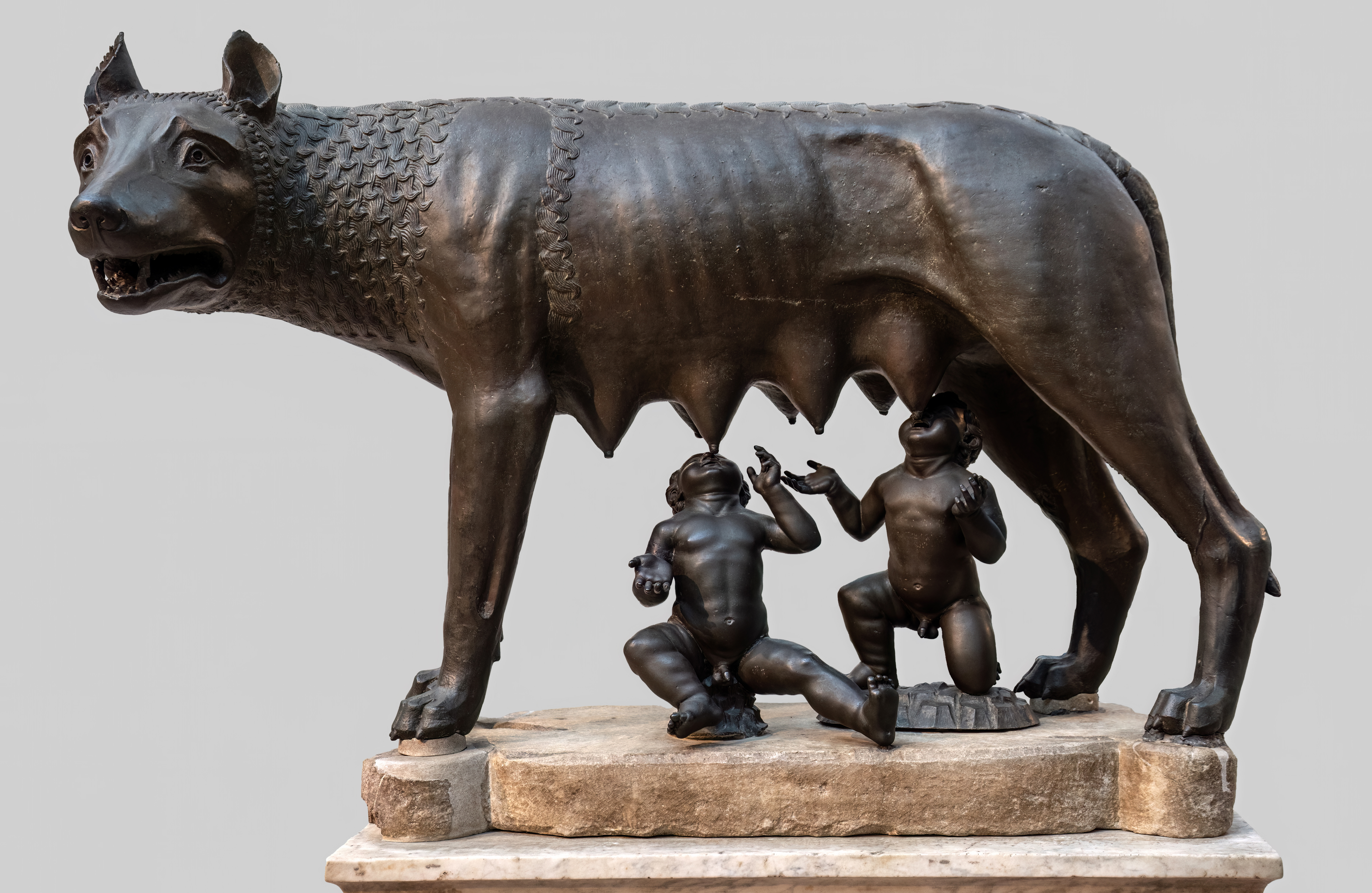
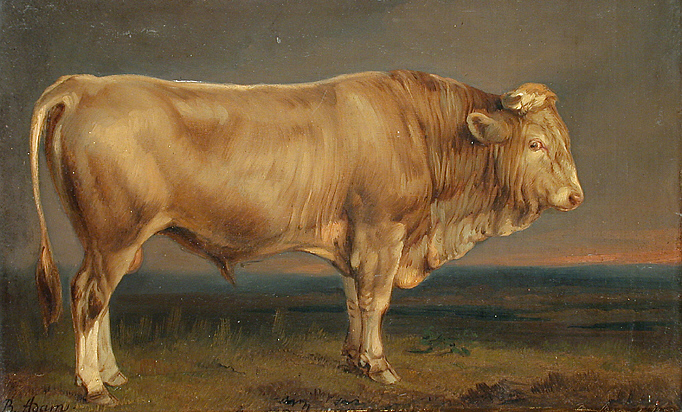
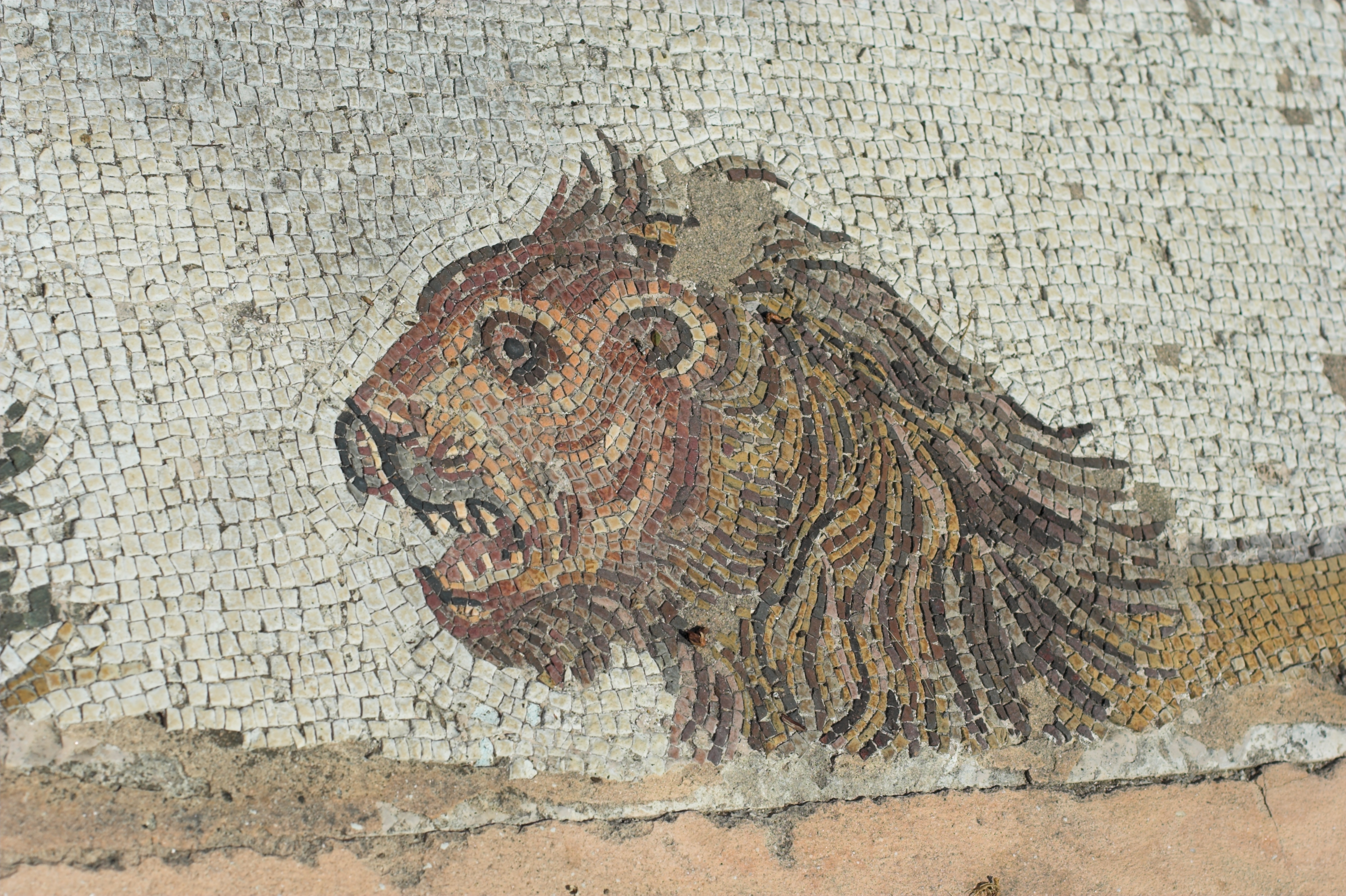
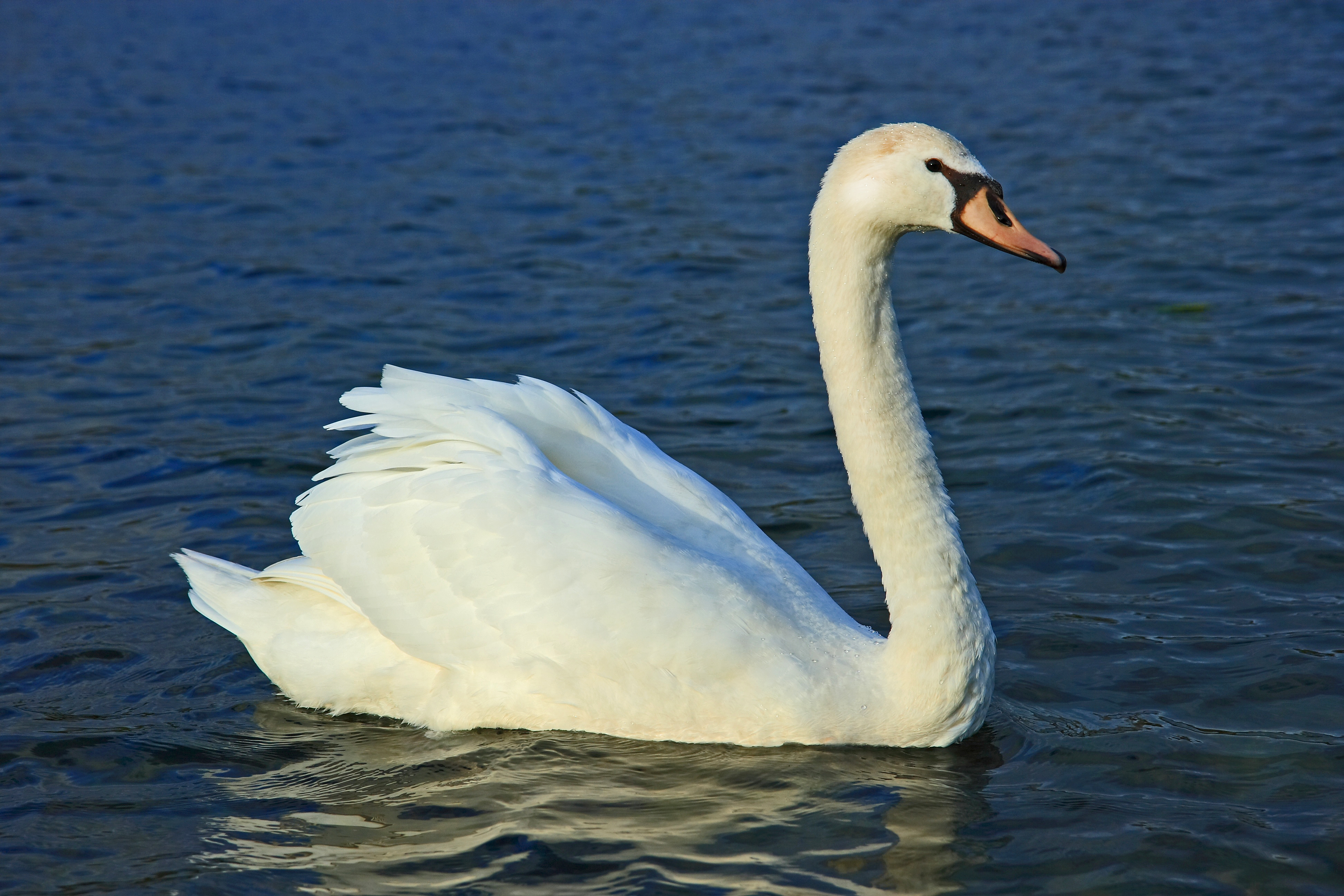
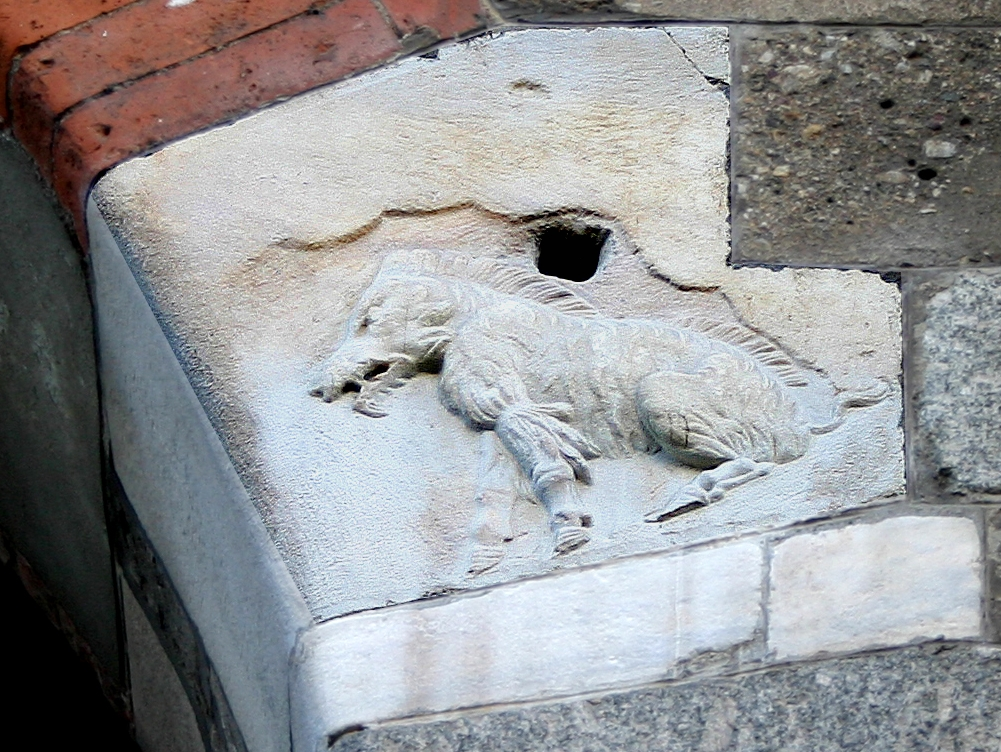
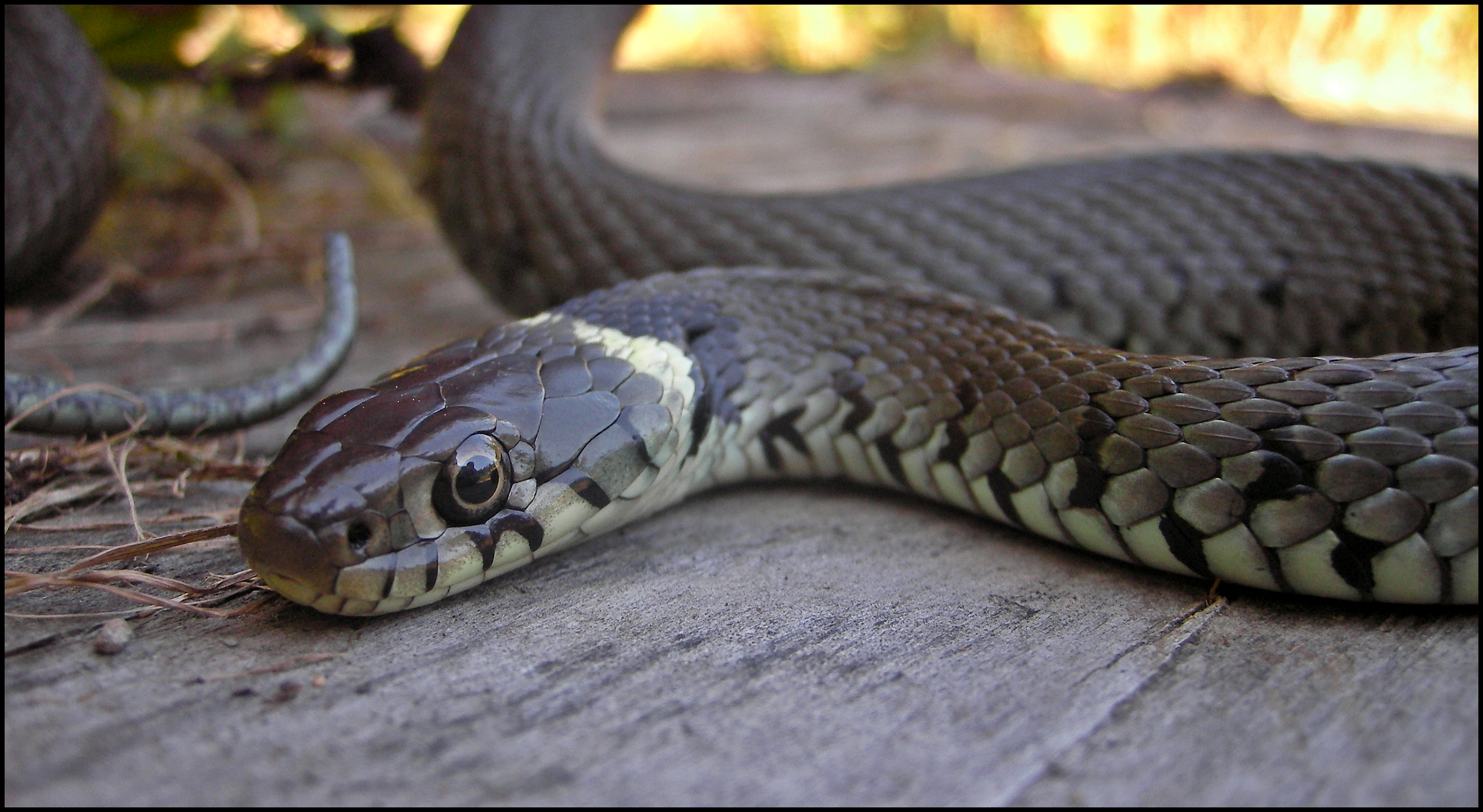
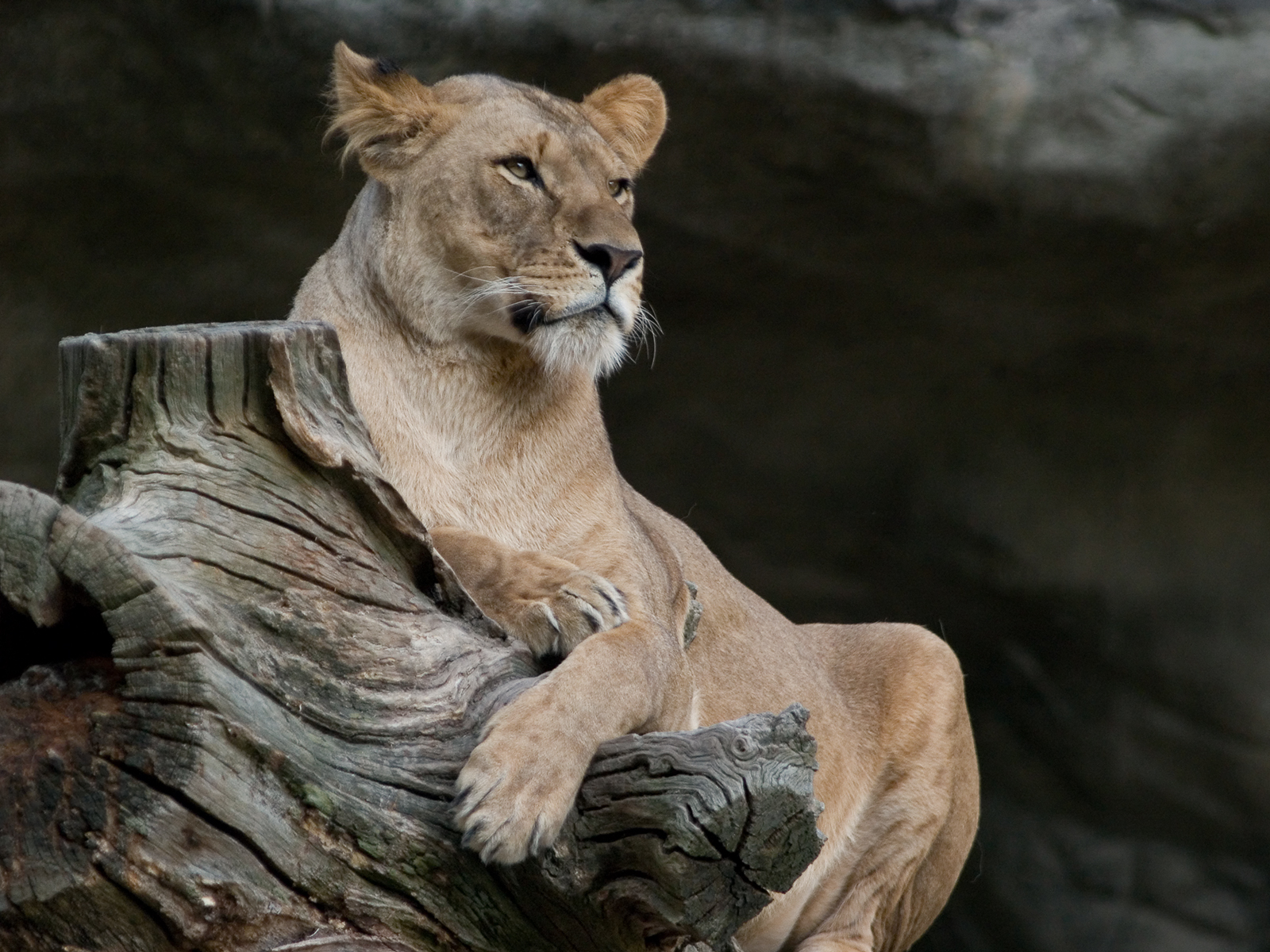
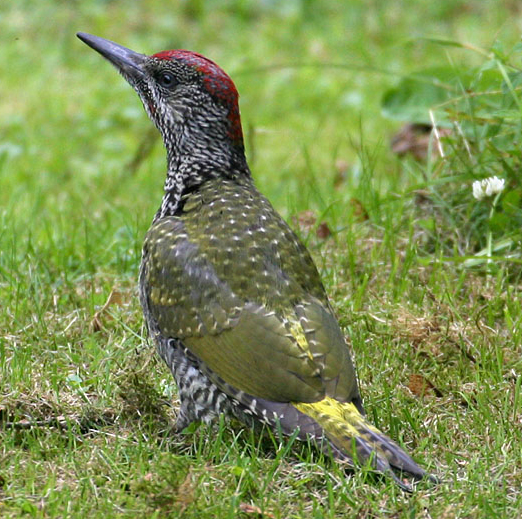
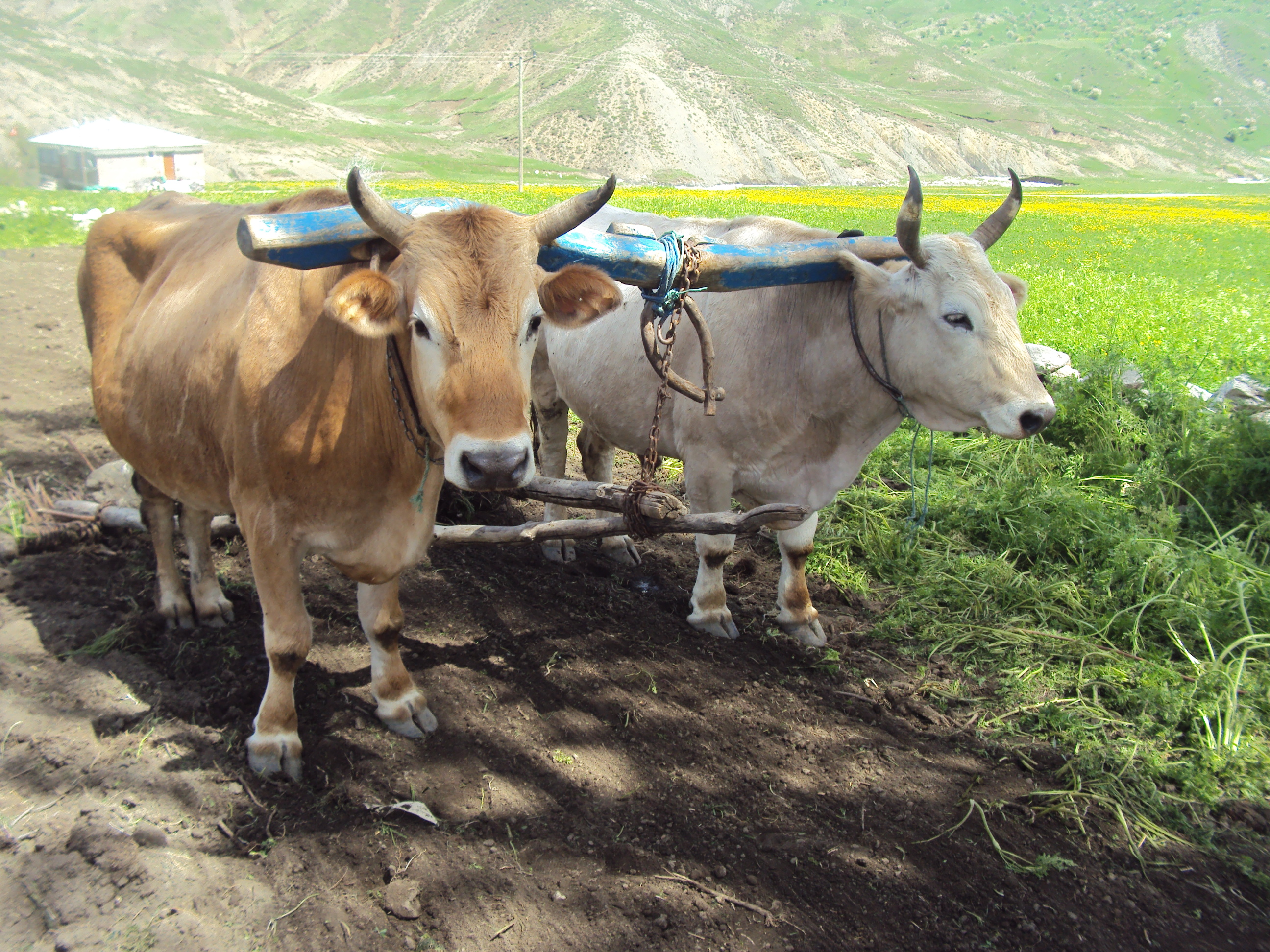
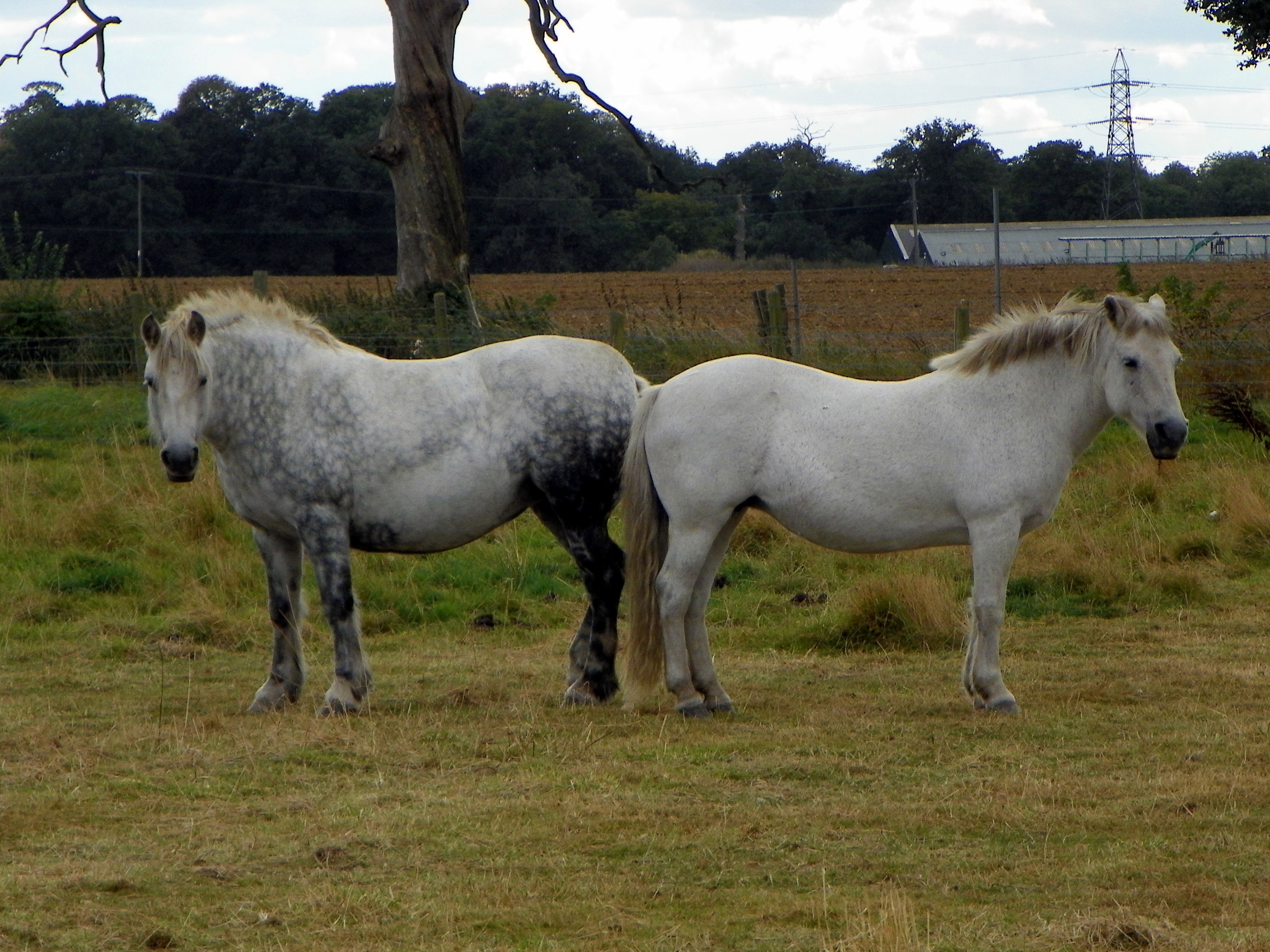
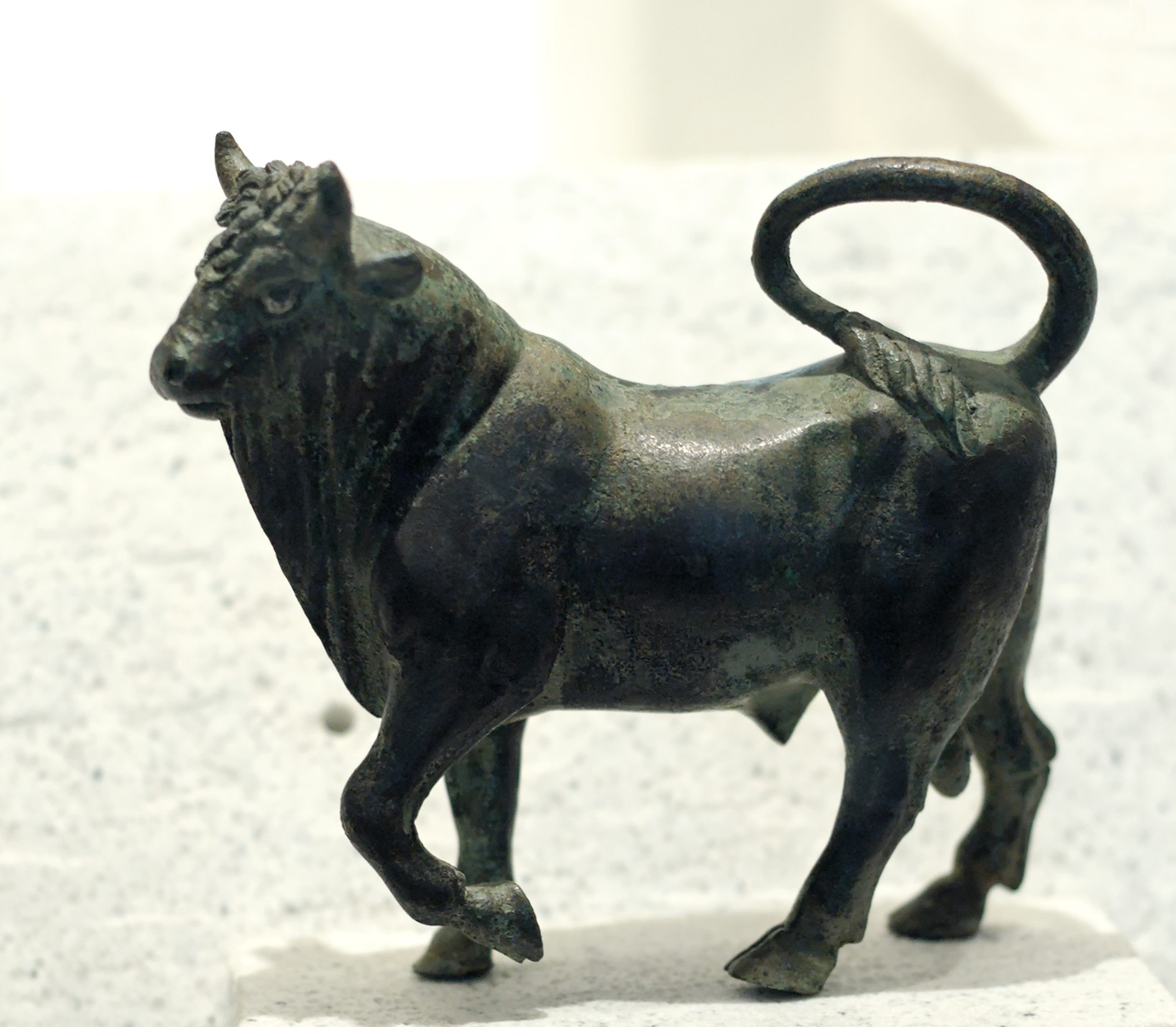
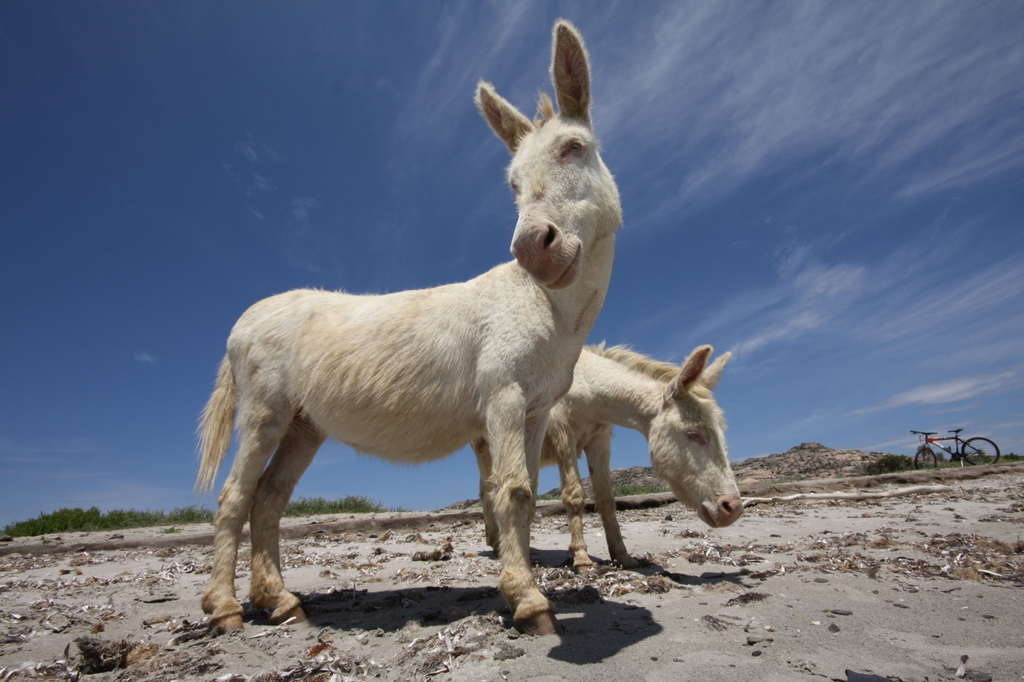
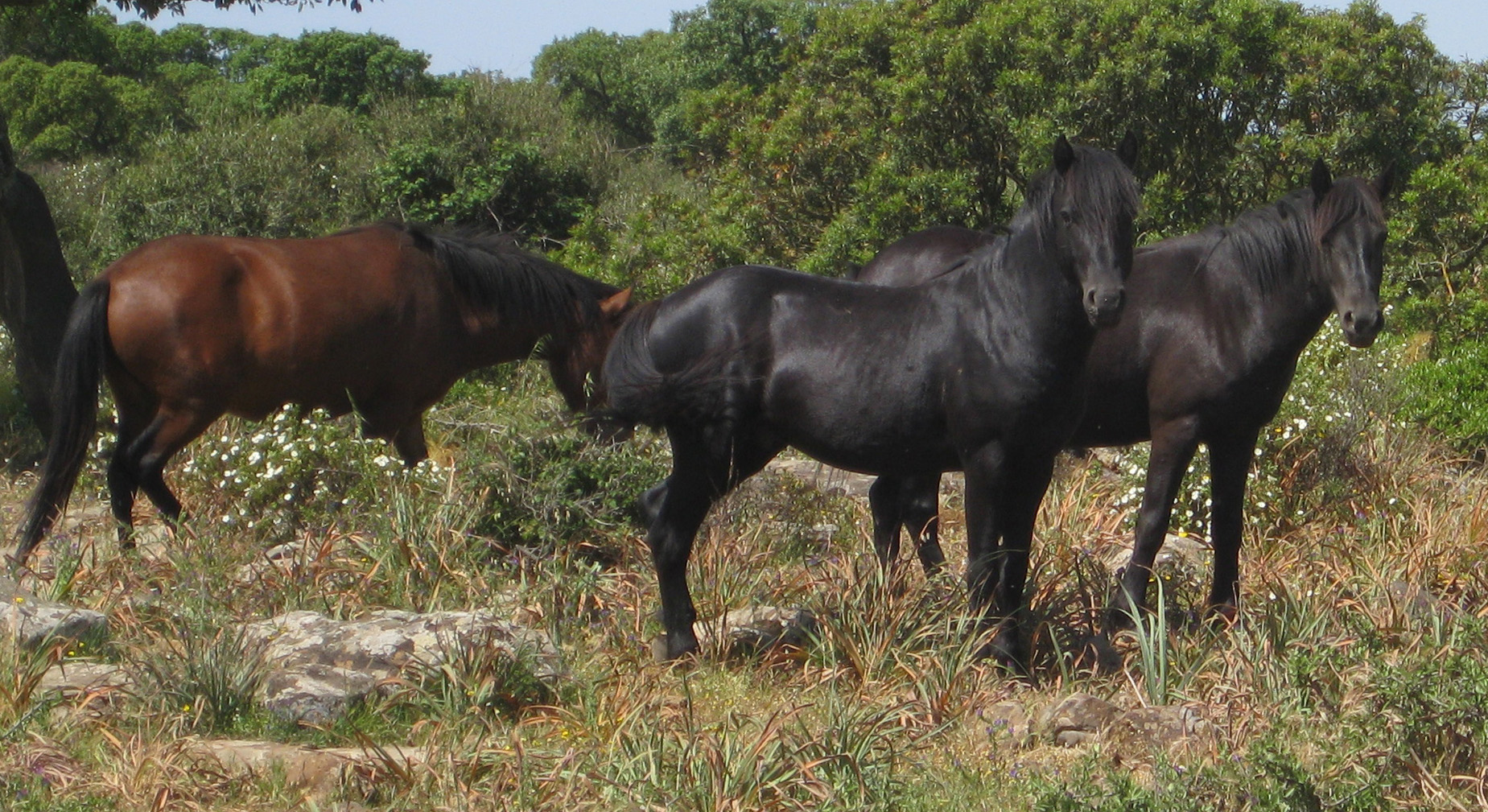
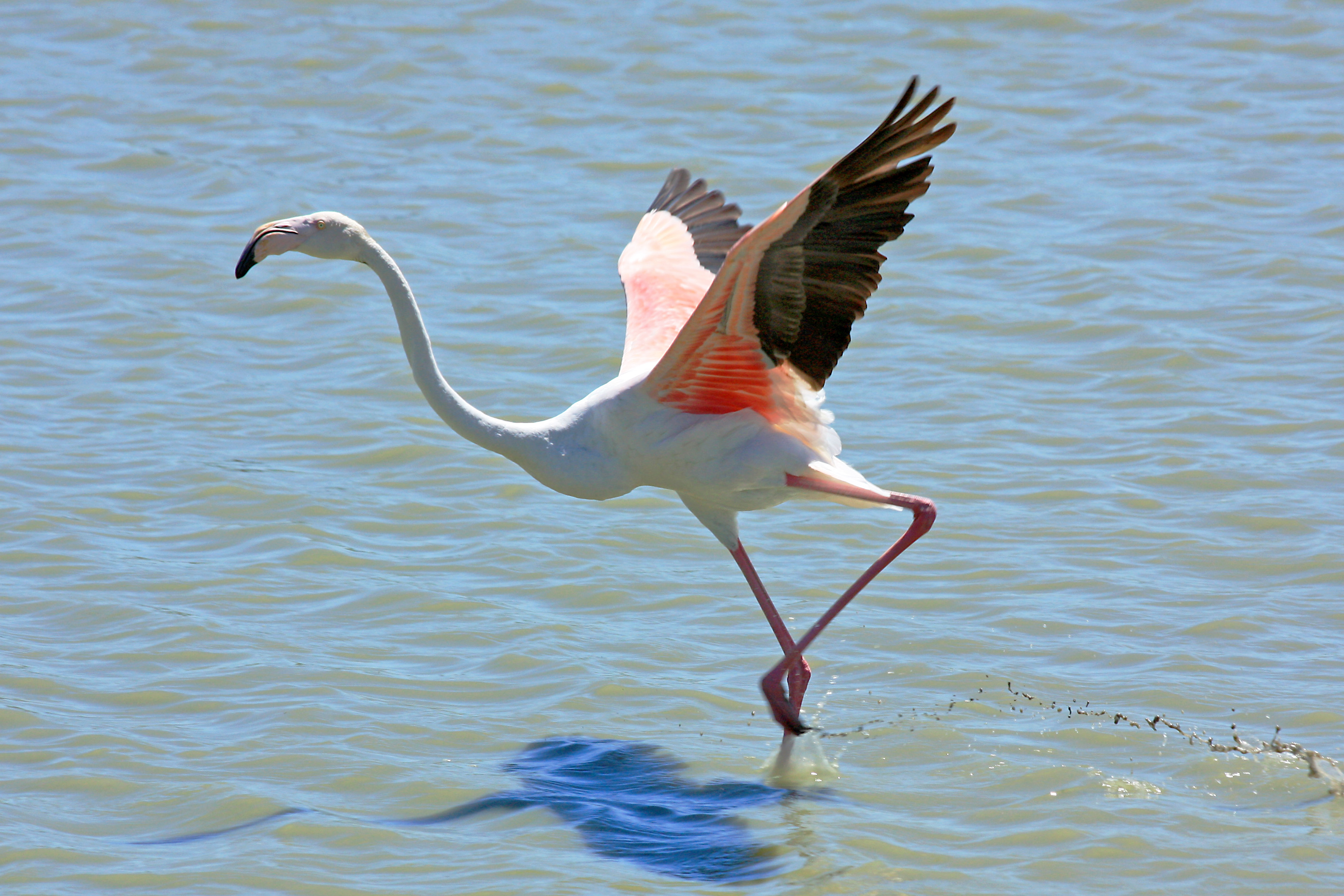
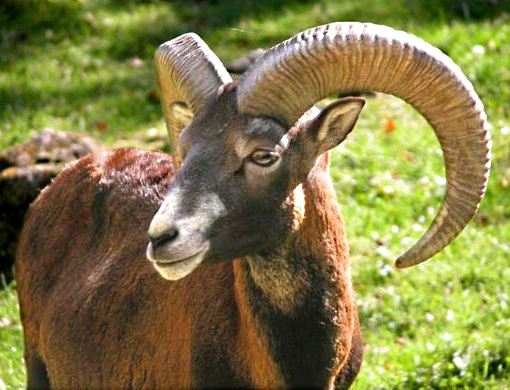
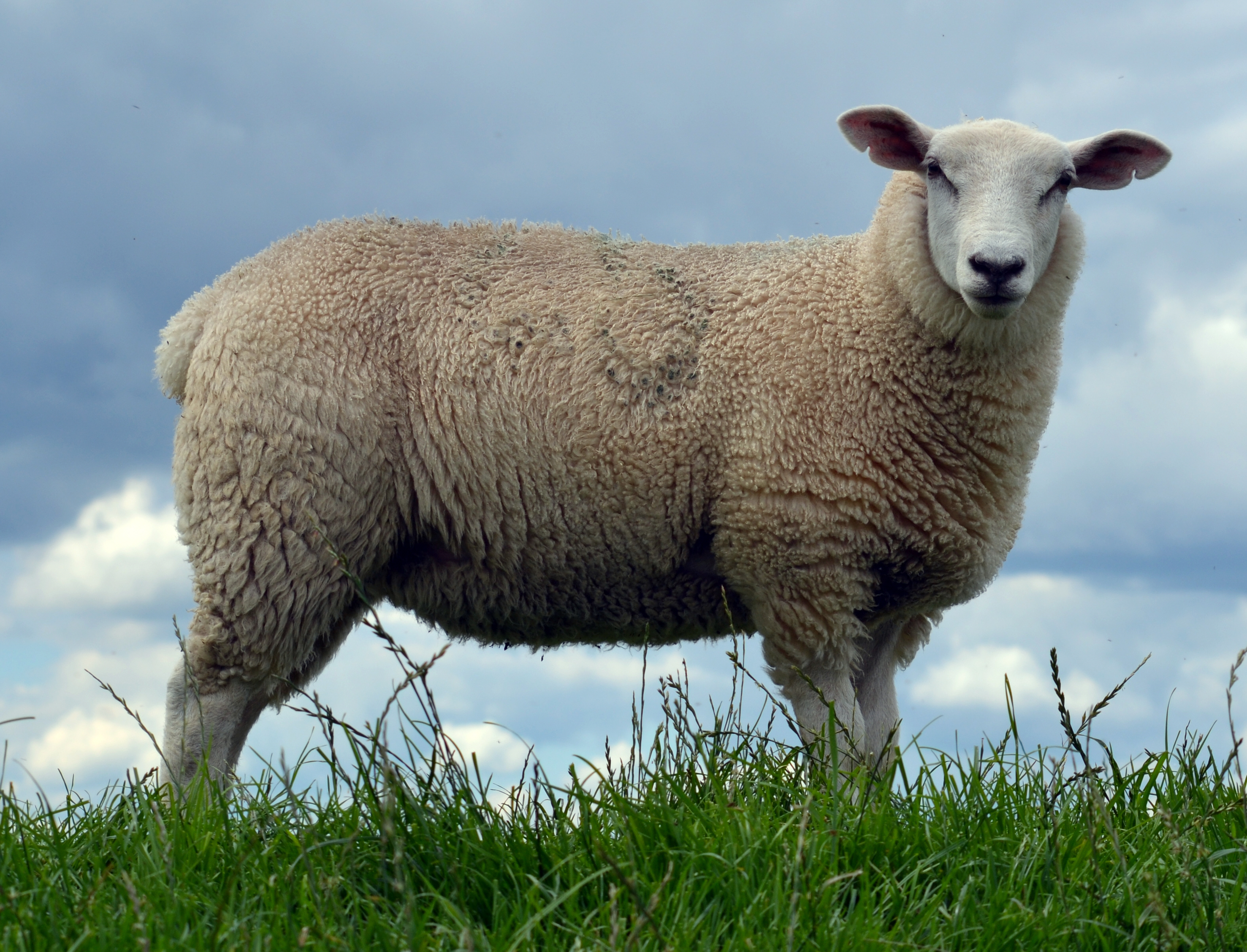
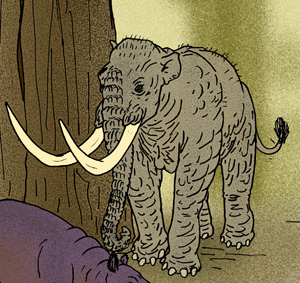
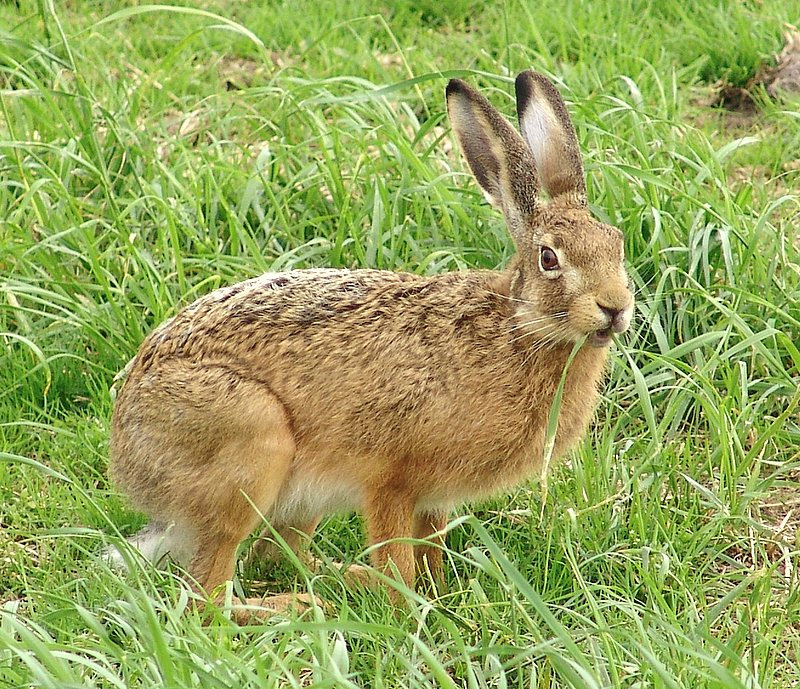
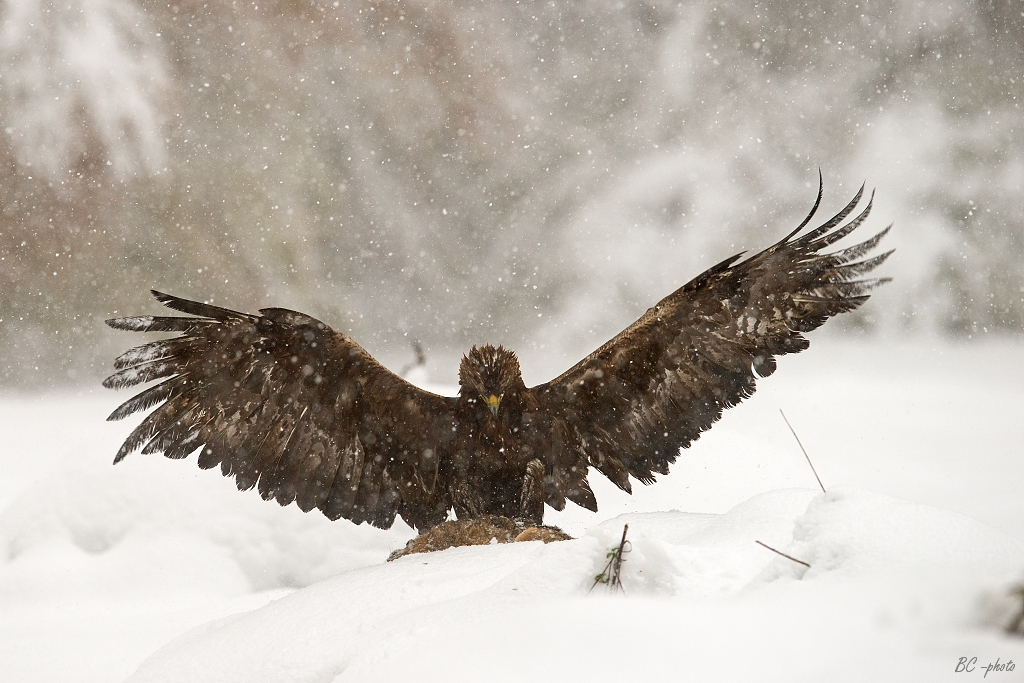
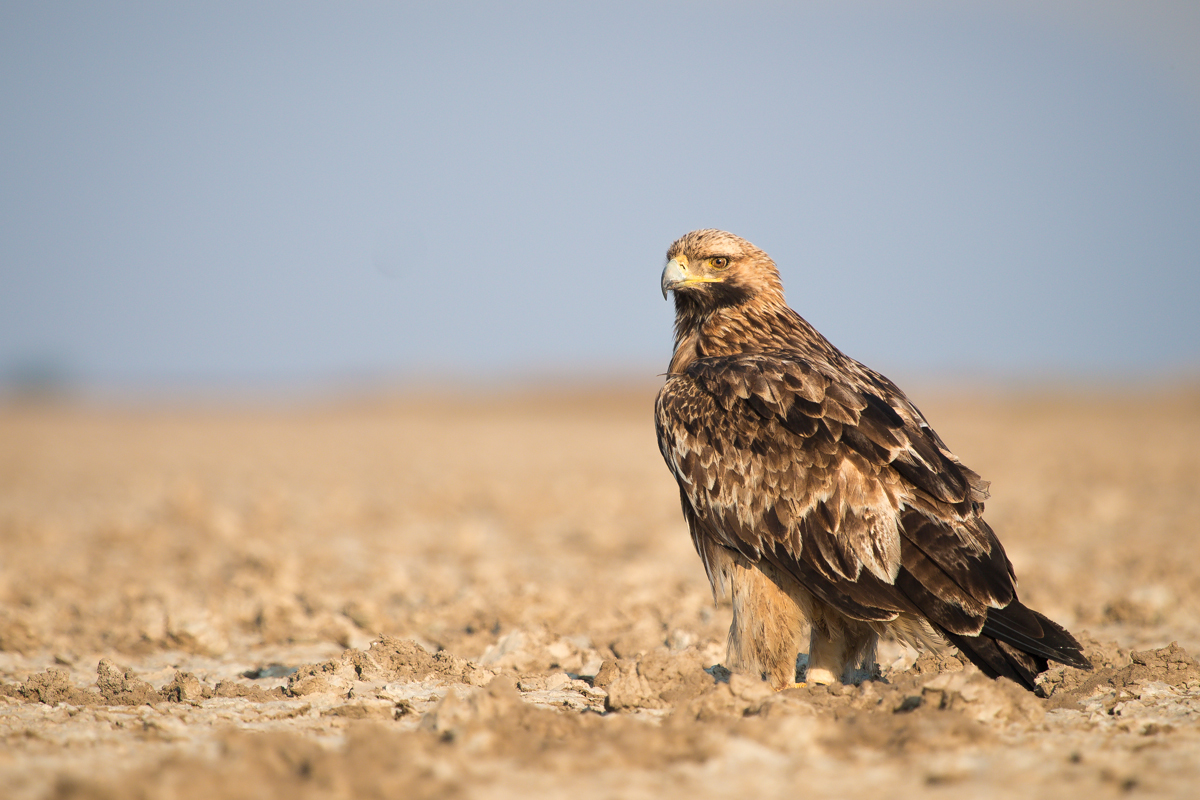
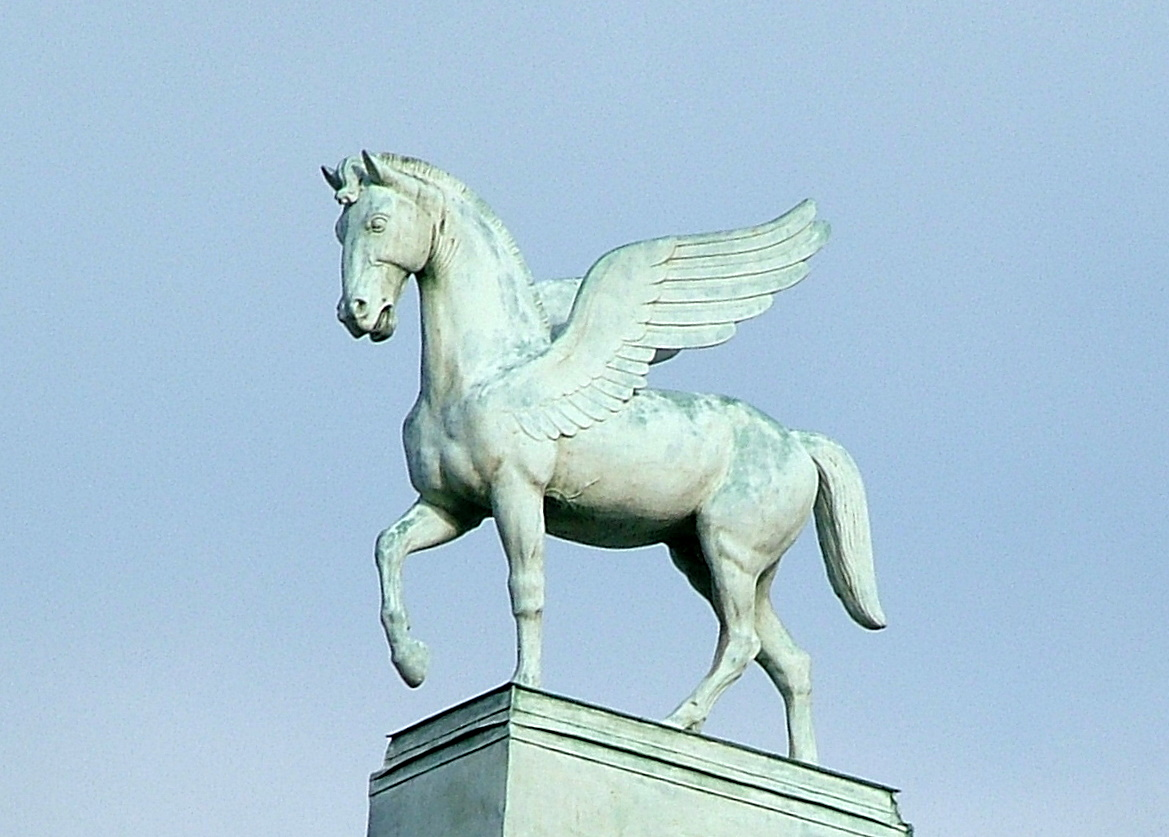
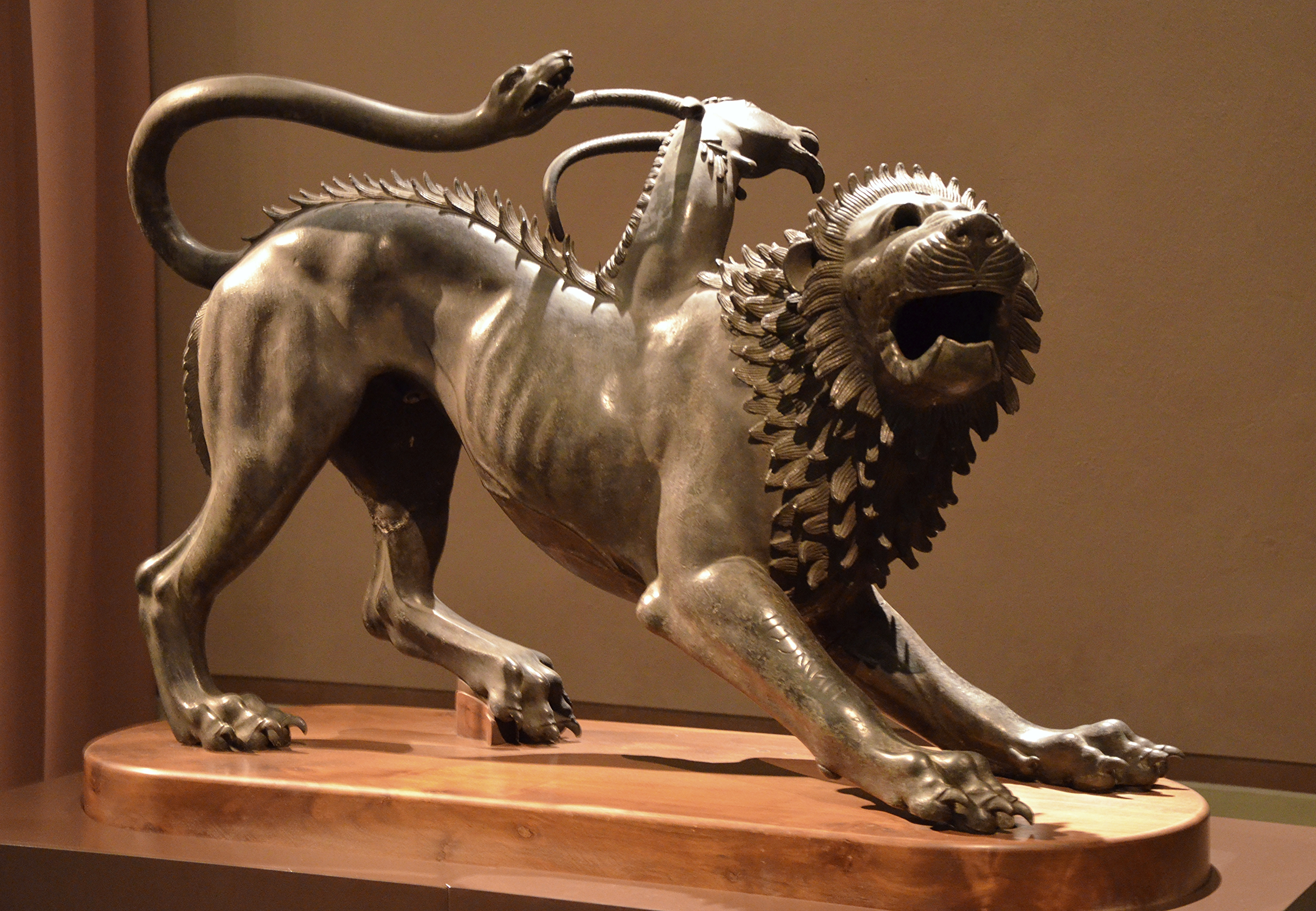
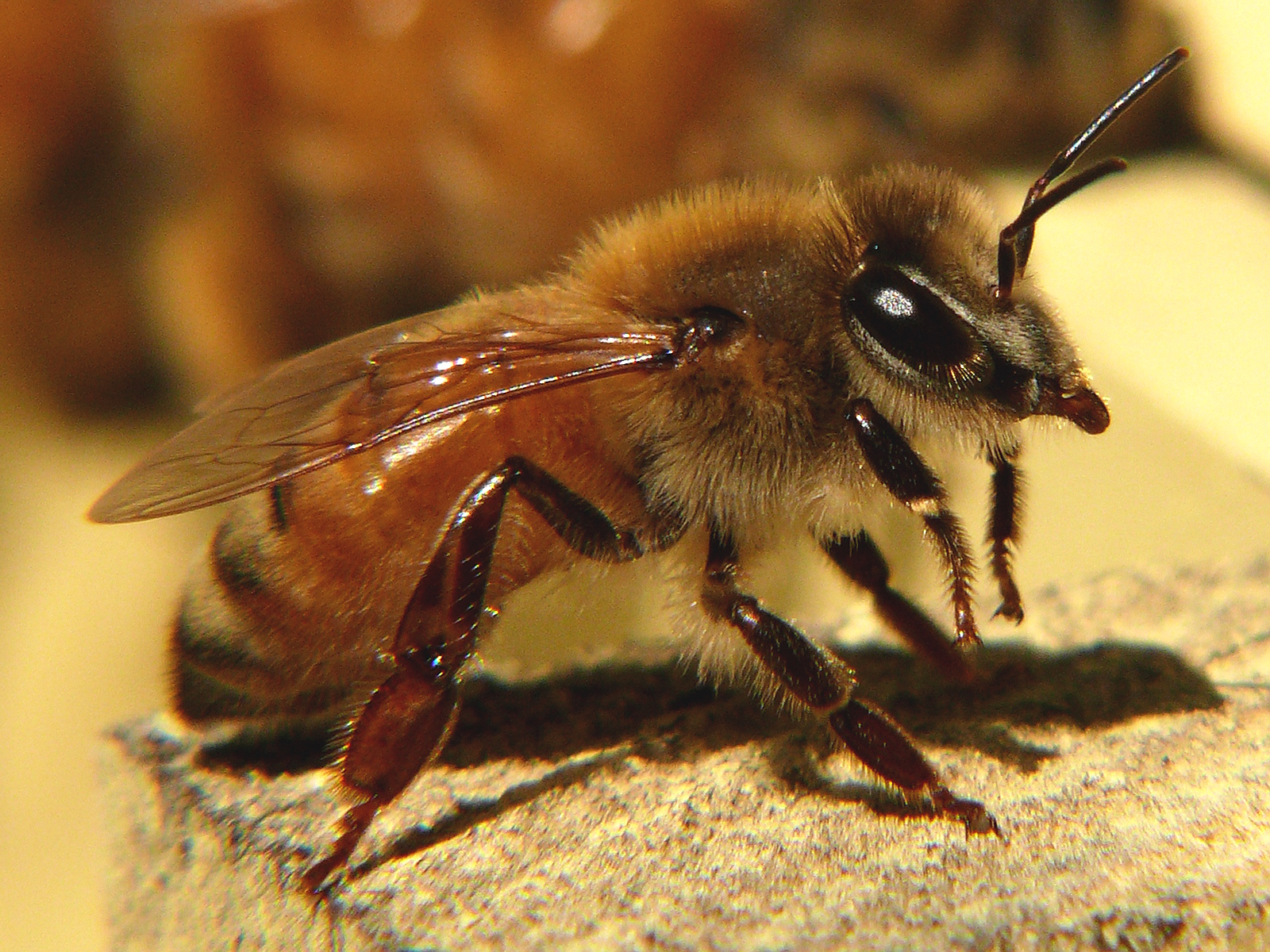
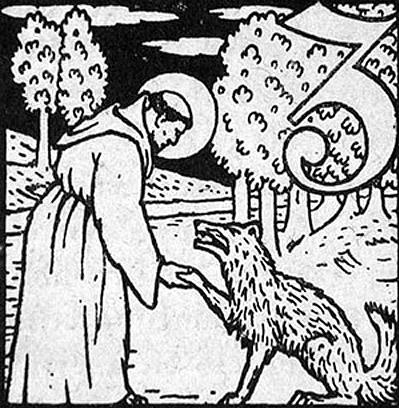
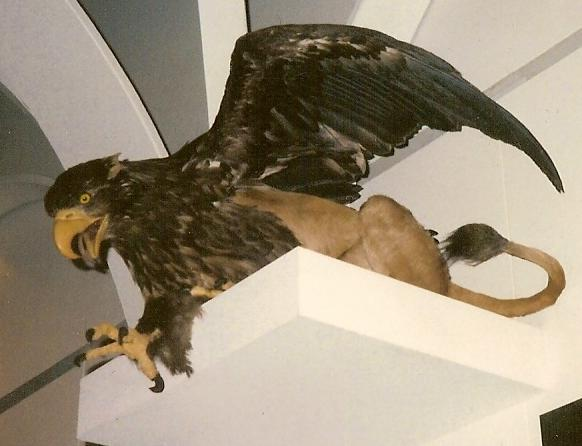
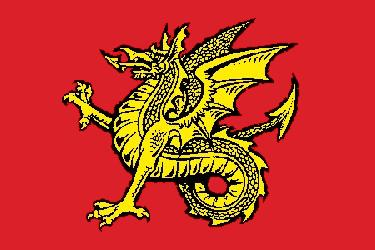
Country	National animal	Picture
Italy	Italian wolf
Administrative region	Historical region and cities	Regional animal	Picture
Abruzzo	Abruzzo	Apennine chamois (Rupicapra pyrenaica ornata)
Abruzzo	Marsica	Marsican brown bear (Ursus arctos marsicanus)
Aosta Valley	Aosta Valley	Lion rampant (Panthera leo)
Apulia	Capitanata and Daunia	Griffin
Apulia	Salento	Common dolphin (Delpihinus delphi)
Apulia	Jonian Apulia	Italic scorpion (Euscorpius italicus)
Basilicata	Lucania	Lucanian wolf (Canis lupus italicus)
Calabria	Vitulia or Bruttium	Bull (Bos taurus)
Campania	Campania Felix and Samnium	Mediterranean Italian buffalo (Bubalus bubalis)
Campania	Irpinia	Irpinian wolf (Canis lupus italicus)
Campania	Benevento and Caudinia	Calydonian boar (Sus scrofa)
Emilia-Romagna	Bologna	Lion (Panthera leo)
Emilia-Romagna	Emilia Estense (FE MO RE)	White eagle
Emilia-Romagna	Piacenza	Capitoline She-Wolf
Emilia-Romagna	Romagna	Rooster (Gallus gallus domesticus)
Friuli-Venezia Giulia	Friuli	Golden eagle (Aquila chrysaetos)
Lazio	Latium	Imperial eagle
Lazio	Rome	Capitoline She-Wolf
Lazio	Sabina	Bull (Bos taurus)
Lazio	Tuscia	Nemean lion
Liguria	Liguria	Swan (Cygnus olor)
Lombardy	Insubria/West Lombardy	Half-woolly sow albino (Sus scrofa)
Lombardy	Insubria/West Lombardy	Grass snake (Natrix natrix)
Lombardy	Brescia	Lioness
Marche	Picenum and Marche	Green woodpecker (Picus viridis)
Molise	Samnium and Molise	Ox (Bos taurus)
Piedmont	Canavese and Ivrea	Epona's horses (Equus ferus caballus)
Piedmont	Turin and Taurasia	Sacred (Apis) bull (Bos taurus)
Sardinia	Sardinia	Asinara donkey (Equus asinus var. albina)
Sardinia	Sardinia	Giara horse (Equus ferus caballus)
Sardinia	Sardinia	Greater flamingo (Phoenicopterus roseus)
Sardinia	Sardinia	Sardinian mouflon (Ovis aries musimon)
Sardinia	Sardinia	Sheep (Ovis aries)
Sicily	Catania	u Liotru/pygmy elephant (Palaeoloxodon falconeri)
Sicily	Messina	Italian hare (Lepus corsicanus)
Sicily	Palermo	Golden eagle (Aquila chrysaetos)
Trentino-Südtirol	Trentino and South Tyrol	Imperial eagle (Aquila heliaca)
Tuscany	Modern Tuscany	Pegasus
Tuscany	Etruria	Chimera of Arezzo
Tuscany	Elba	Honeybee (Apis mellifera)
Umbria	Umbria region	Wolf of Gubbio
Umbria	Perugia and Narni	Griffin
Umbria	Terni	Thyrus the wivern

=== Japan ===
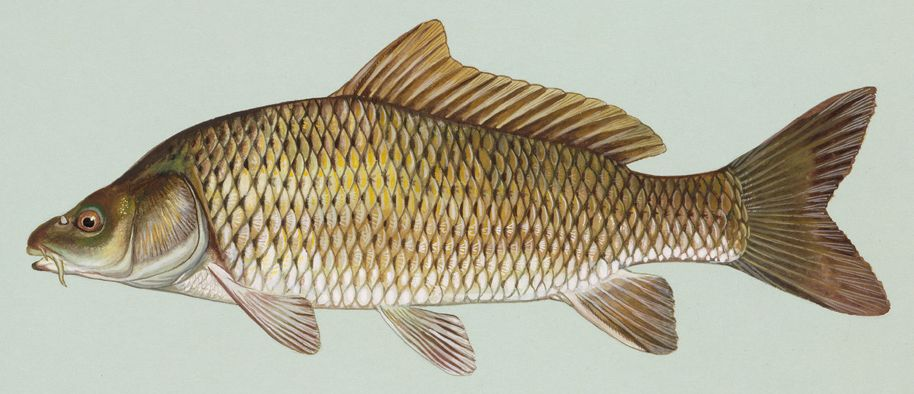
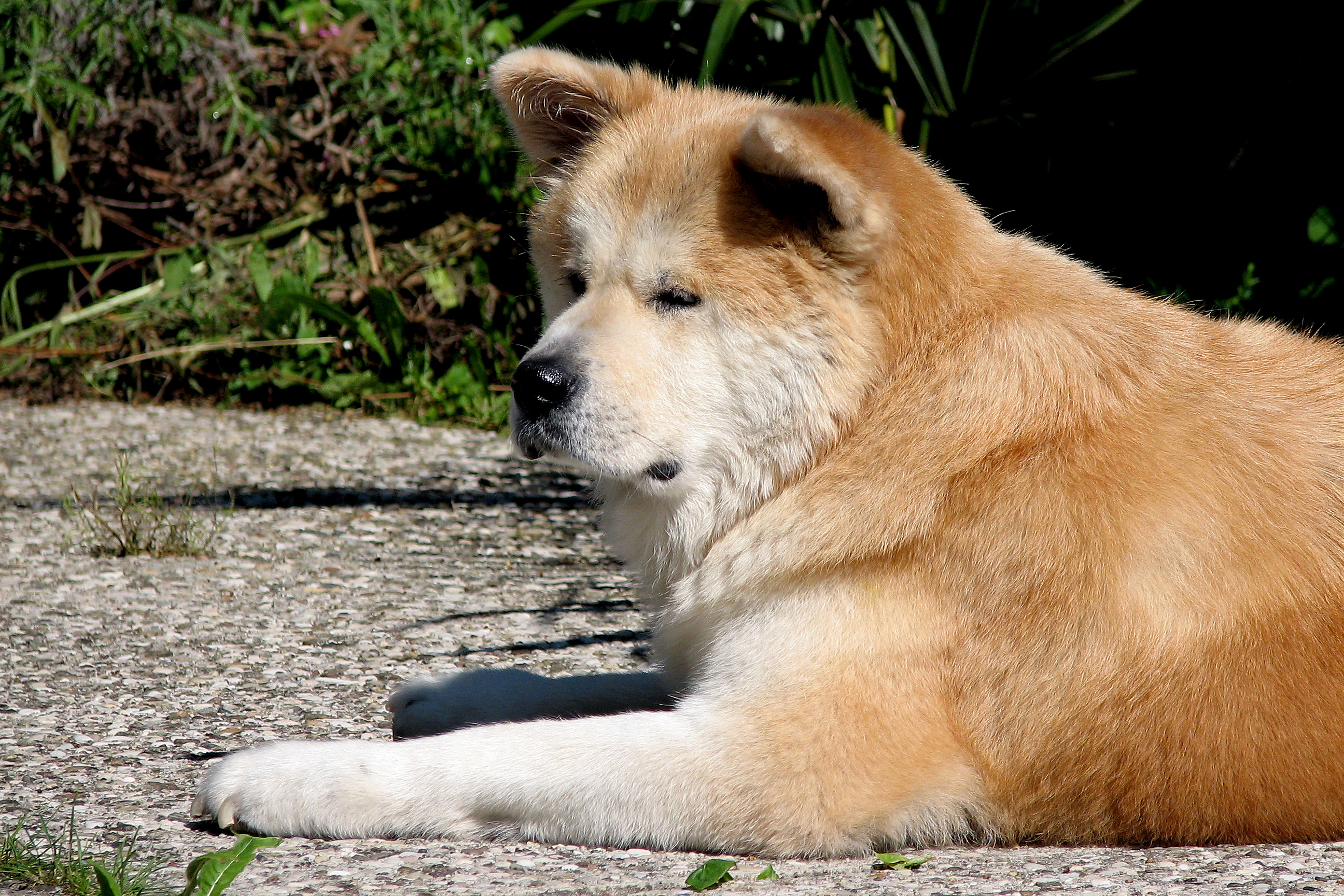
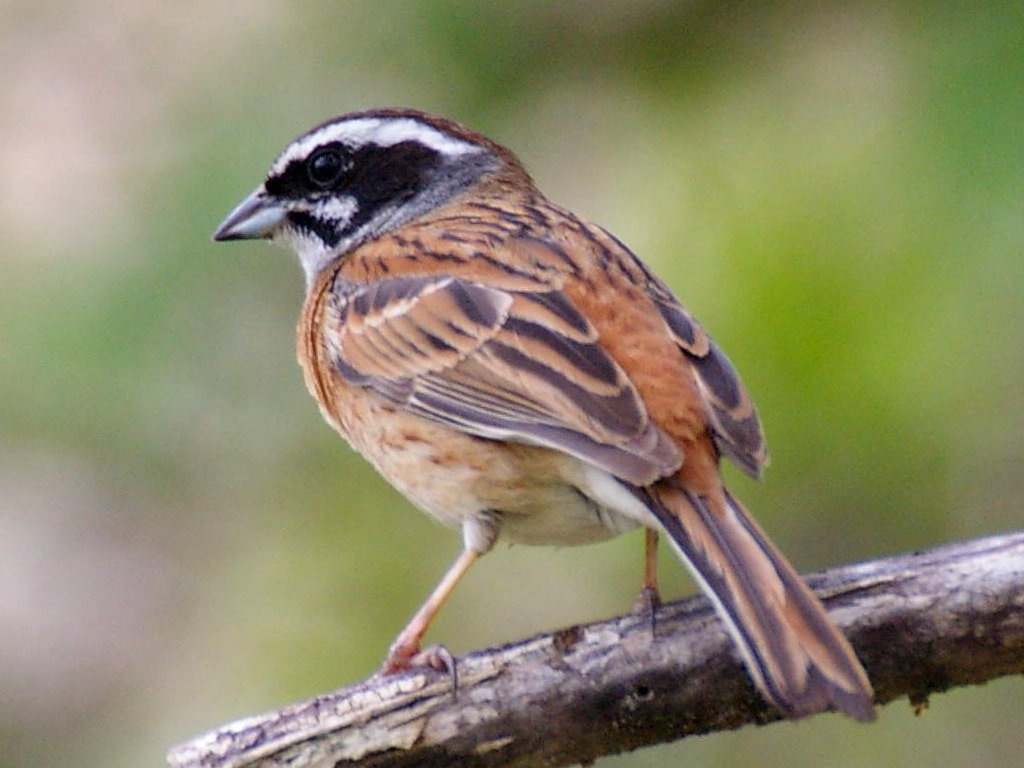
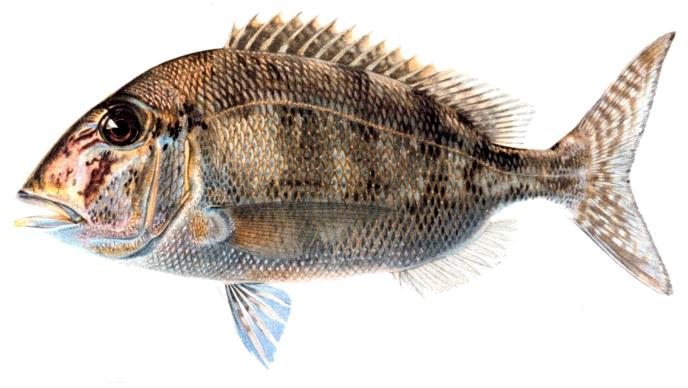
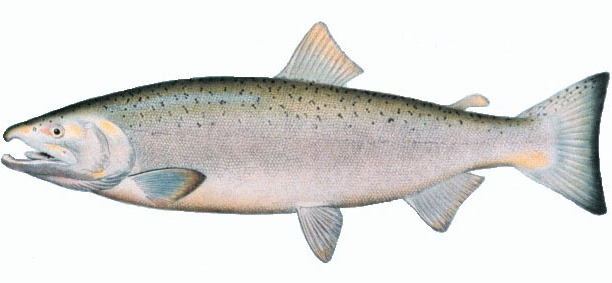
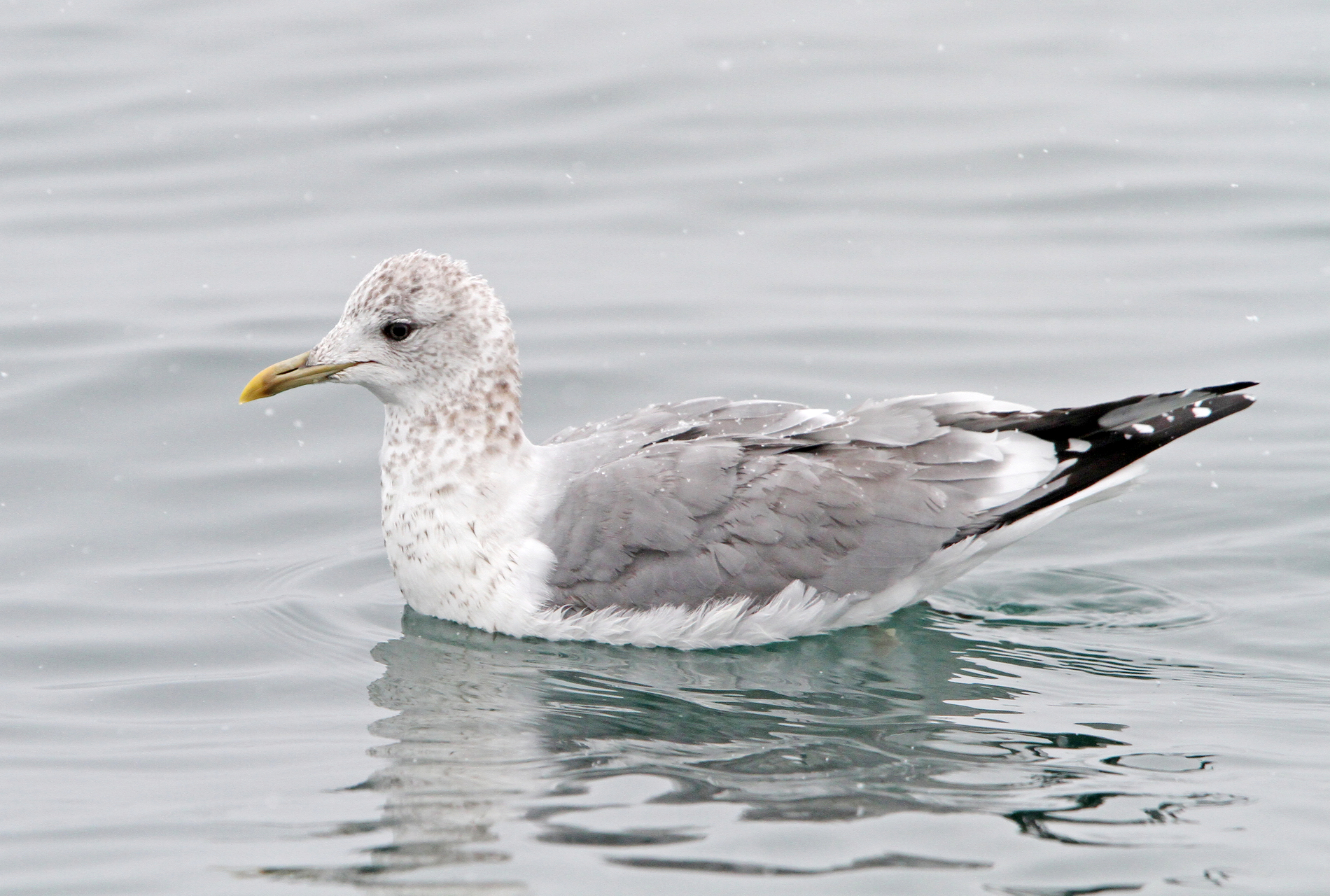
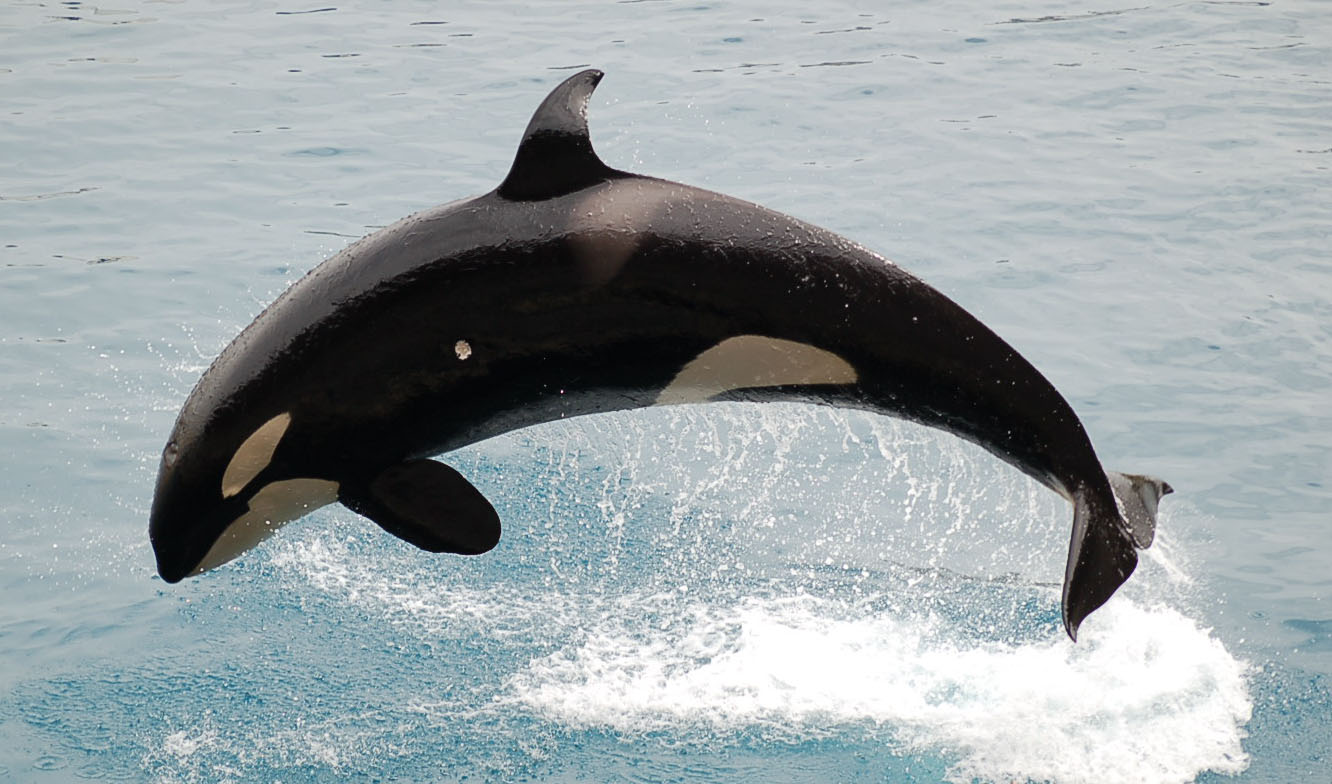
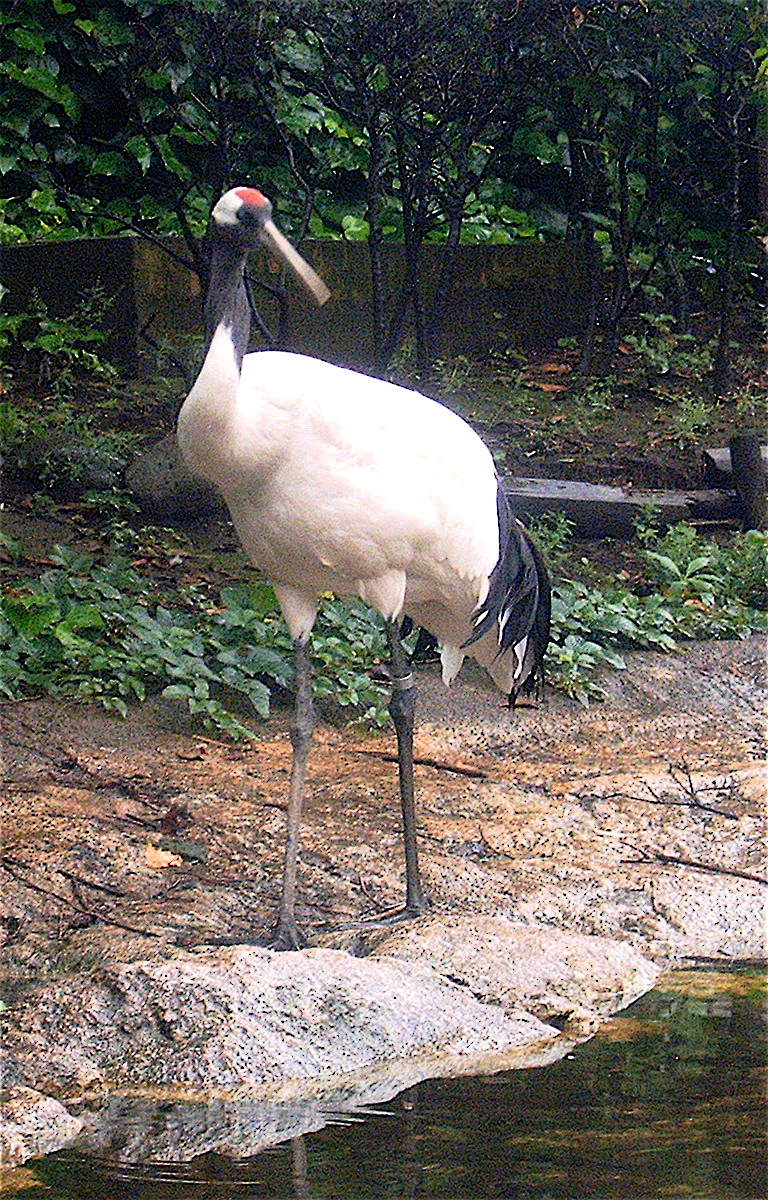
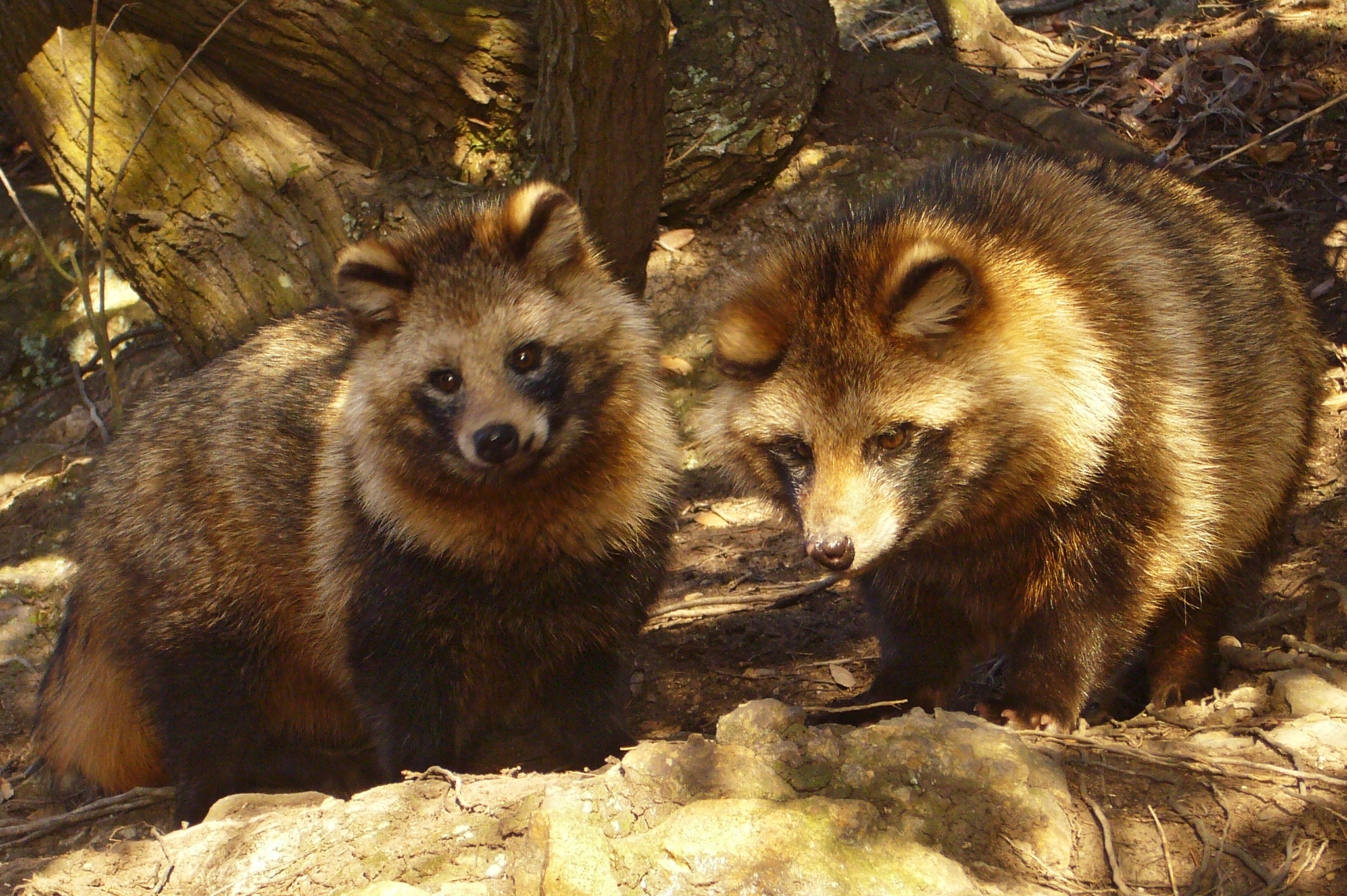
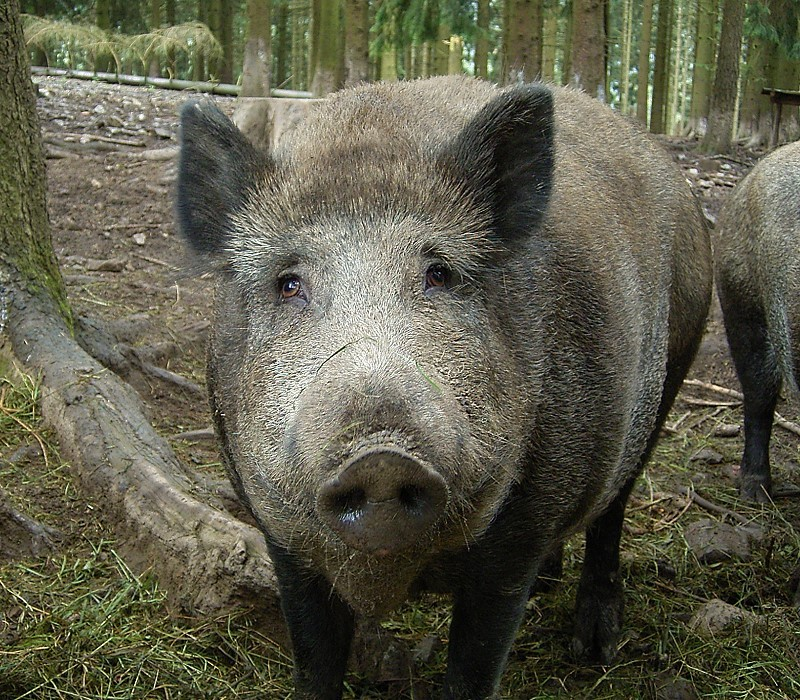
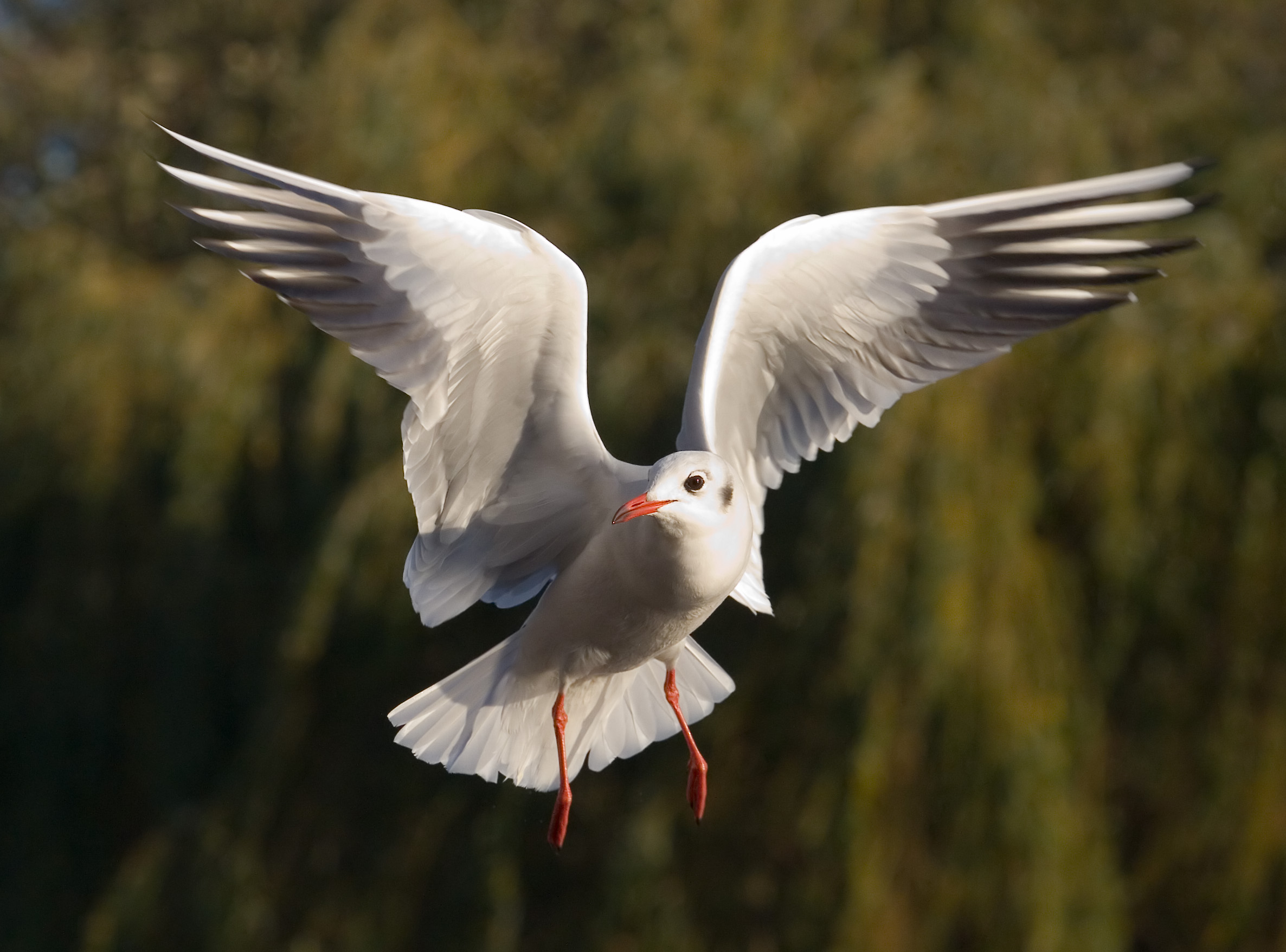
Country	National animal	Picture
Japan	Koi, green pheasant
Prefecture	Prefectural animal
Akita	Akita dog
Chiba	Meadow bunting
Chiba	Bream
Chiba	Coho salmon
Kanagawa	Common gull
Kanagawa	Orca
Hokkaidō	Red-crowned crane
Kyoto	Raccoon dog
Kyoto	Streaked shearwater
Tokyo	Boar
Tokyo	Black-headed gull

=== Malaysia ===
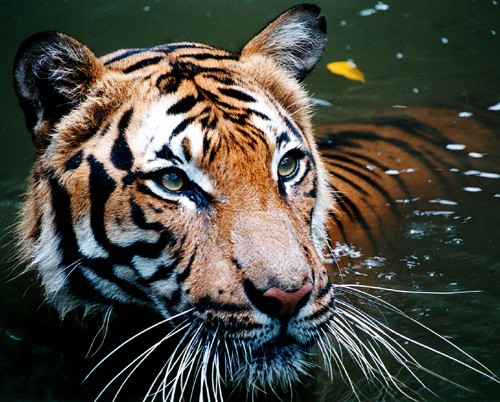
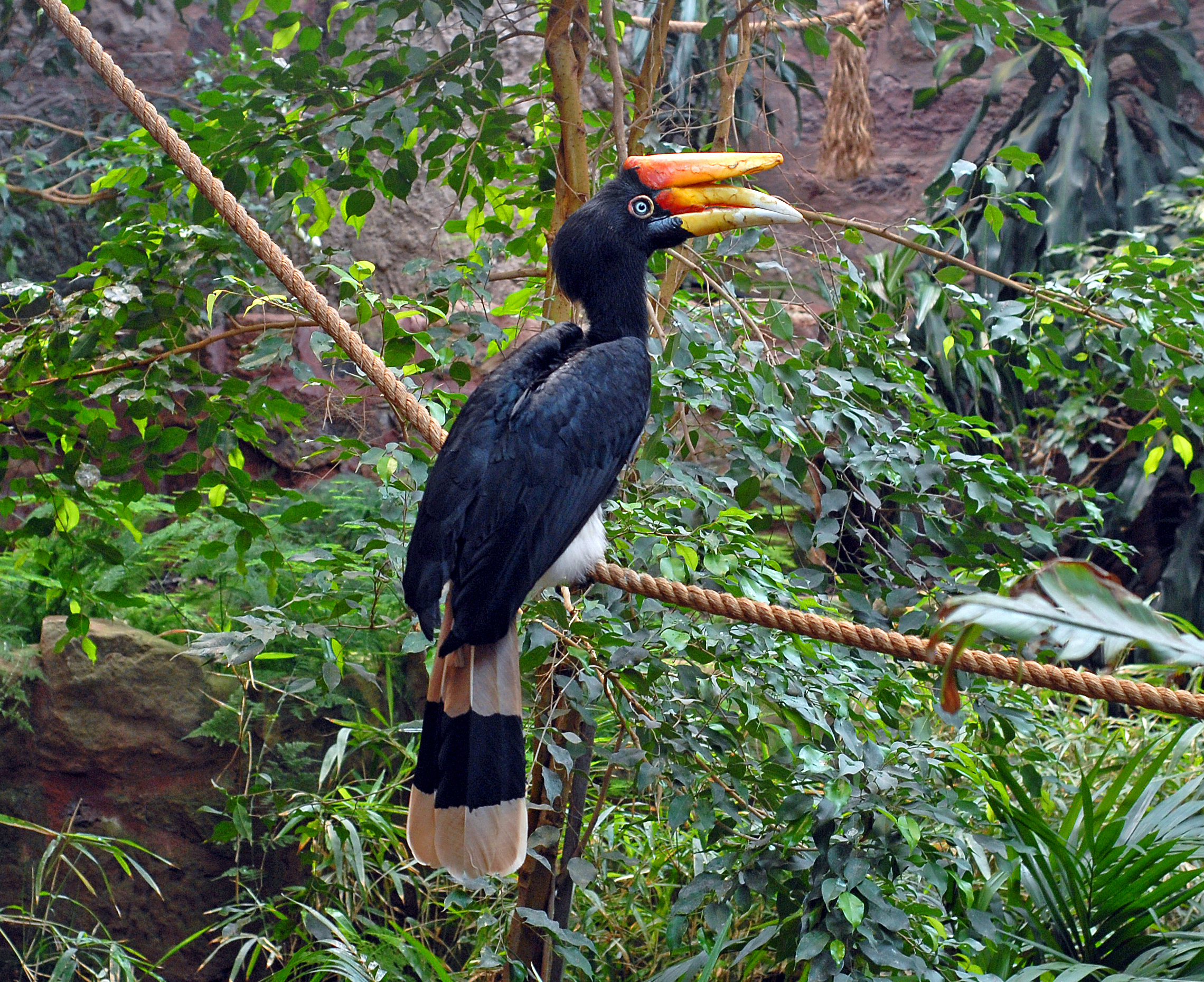
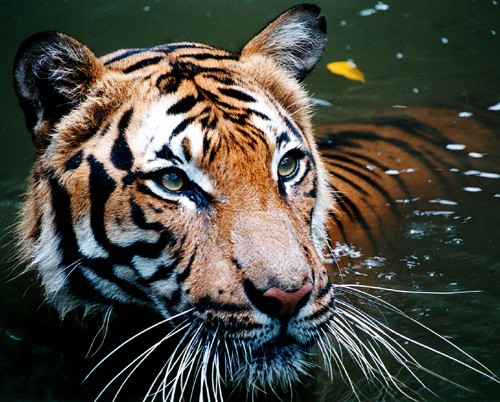
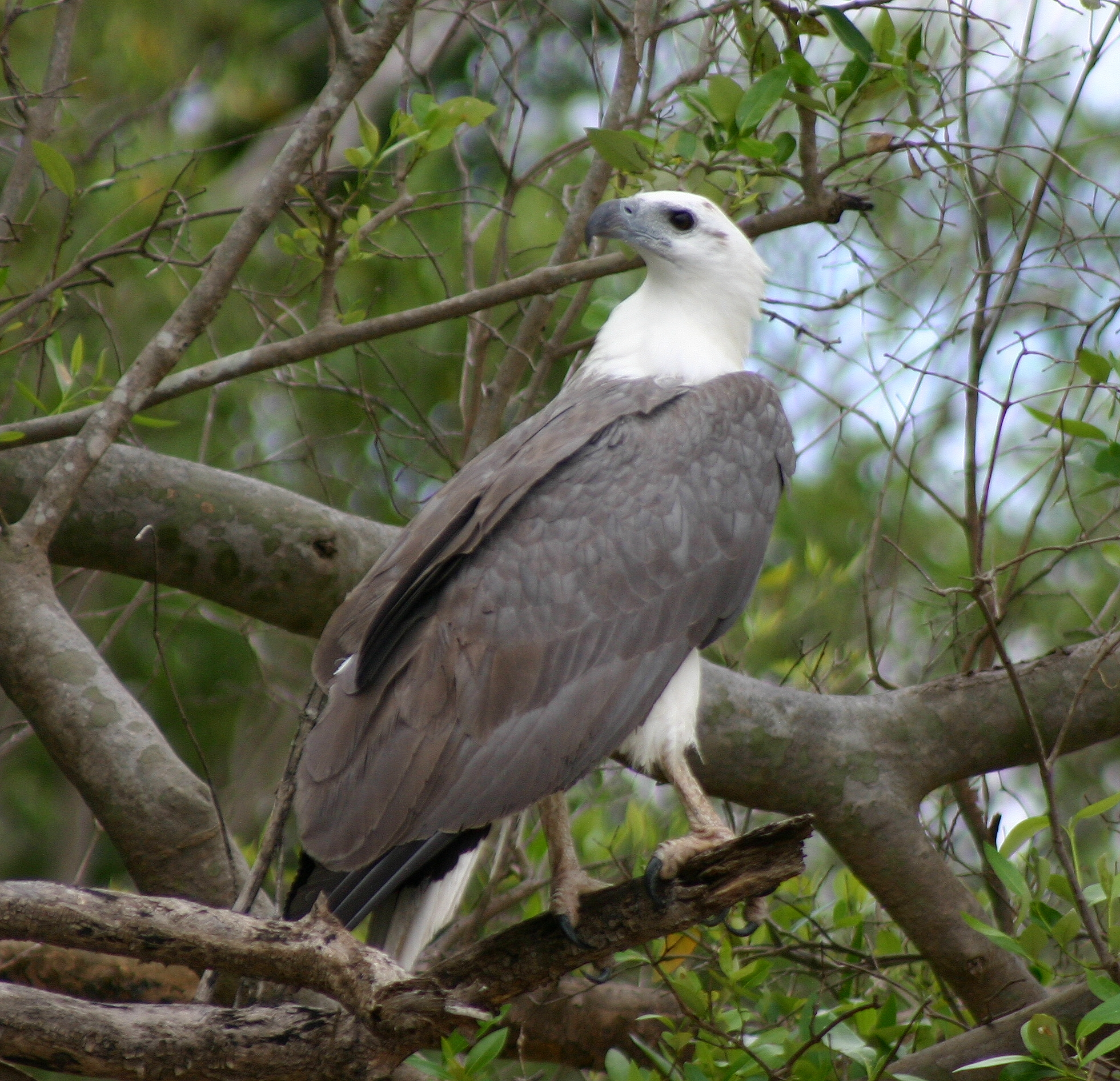
Country	National animal
Malaysia	Malayan tiger
State	State animals and birds	Pictures
Sarawak	Rhinoceros hornbill
Johor	Malayan tiger
Perak	Malayan tiger
Negeri Sembilan
Malacca	Mousedeer
Selangor	White-bellied sea eagle

=== Mexico ===
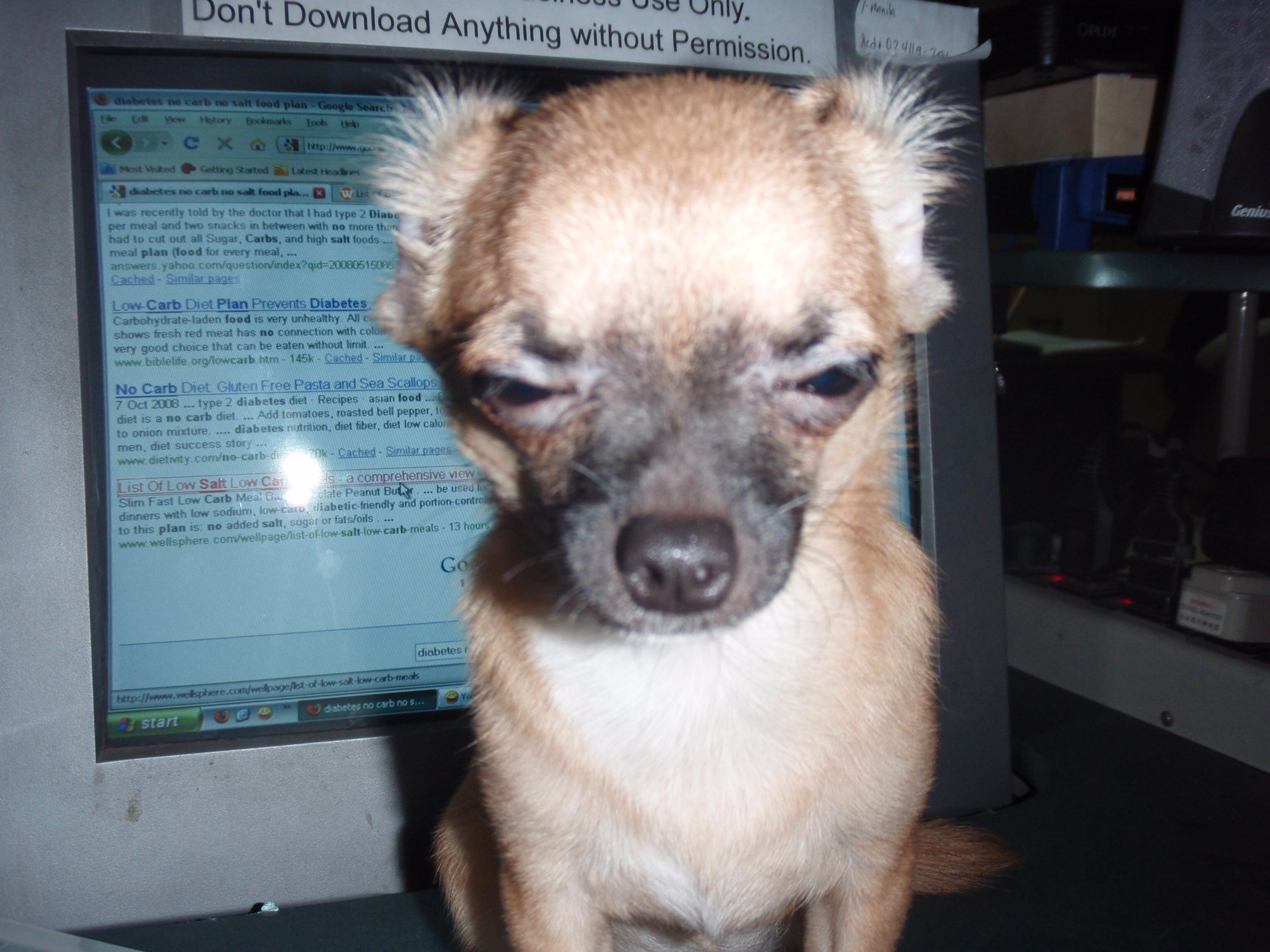
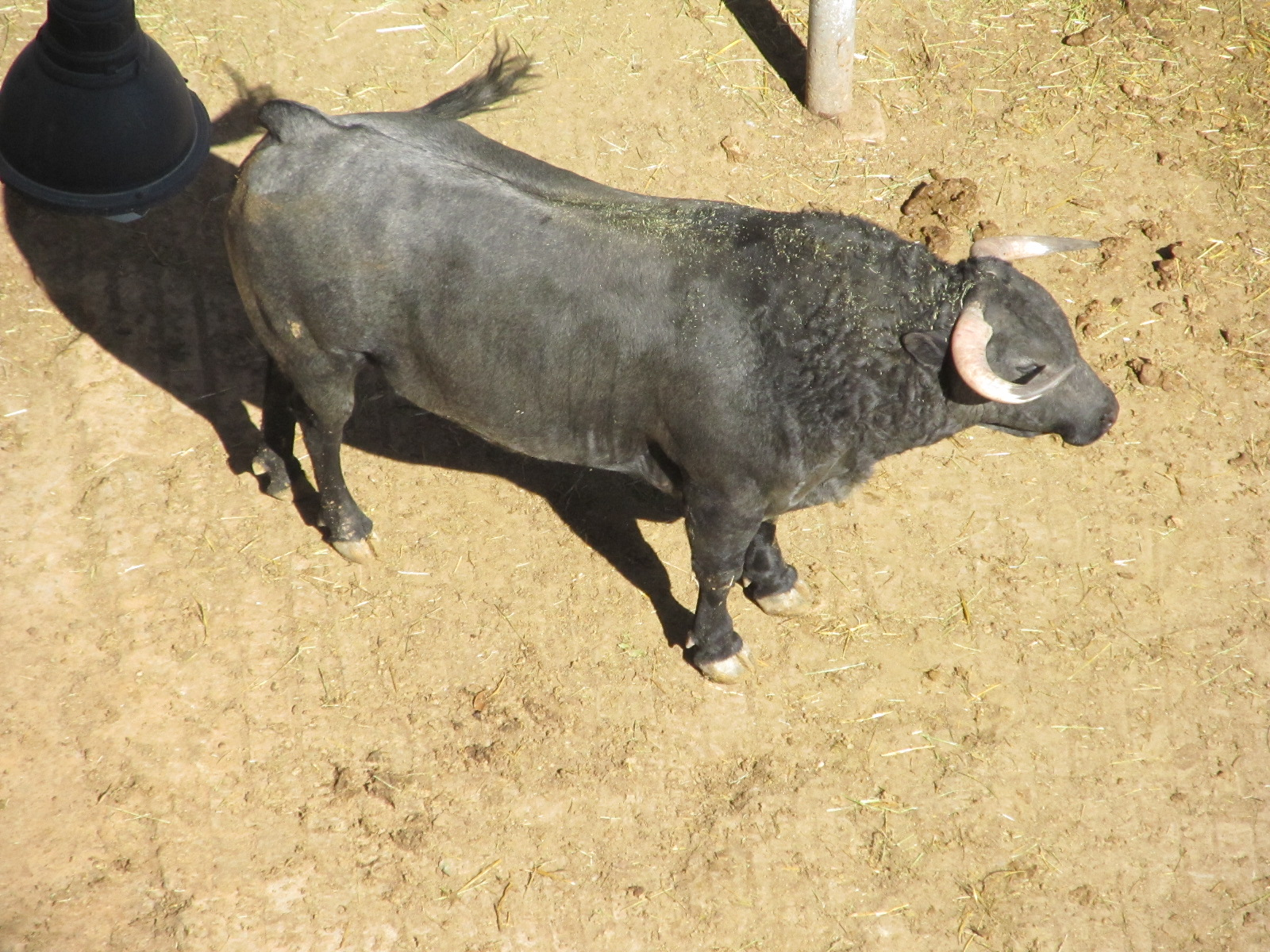
State	State animal	Picture
(Chihuahua (state)) Chihuahua	Chihuahua
Tabasco	Bull

=== Pakistan ===
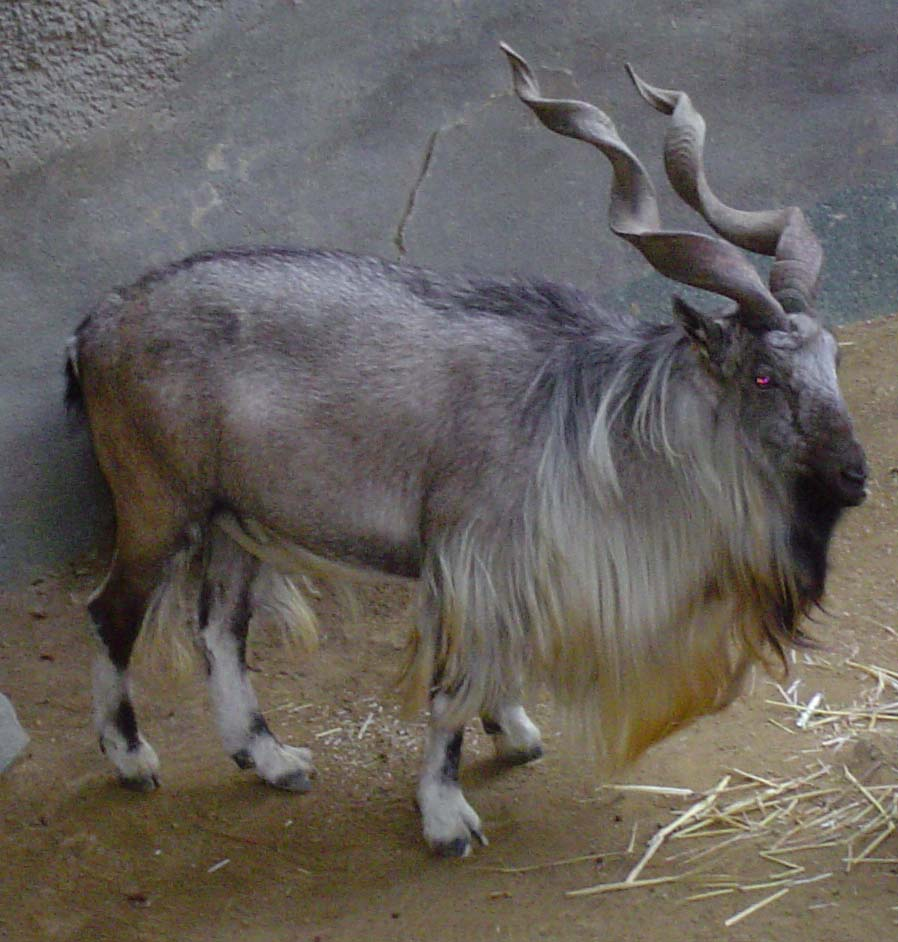
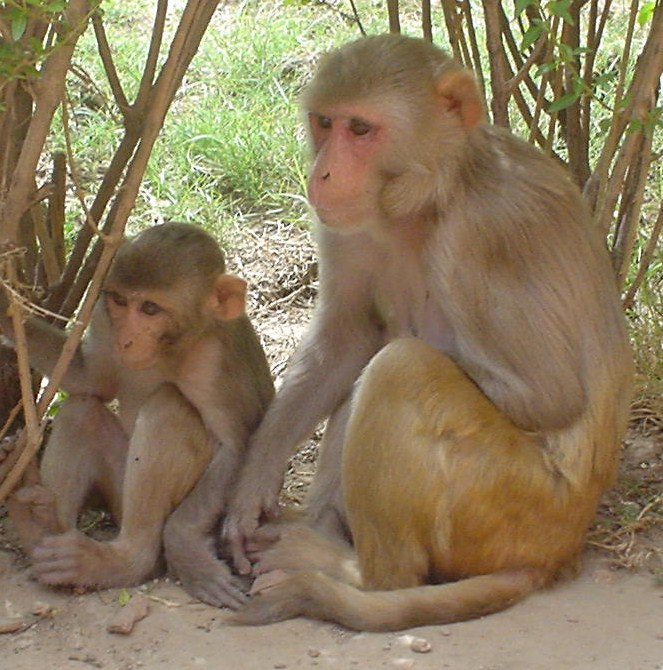
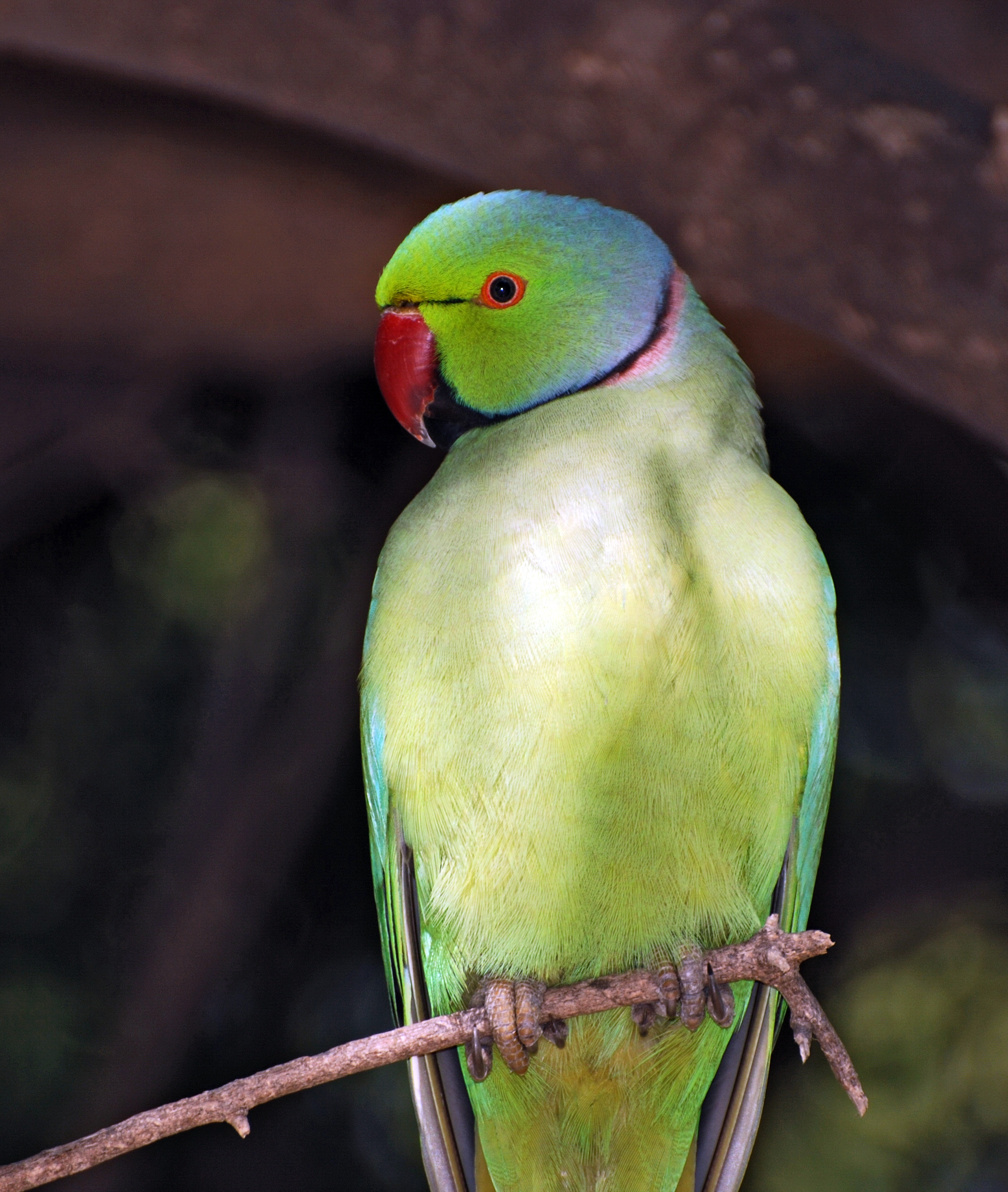
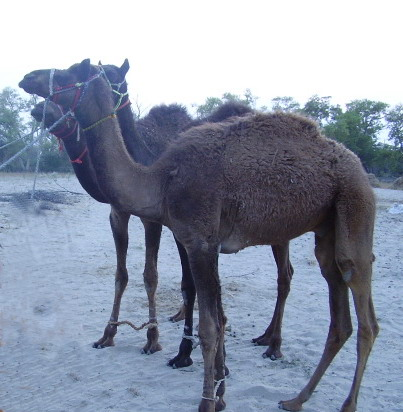
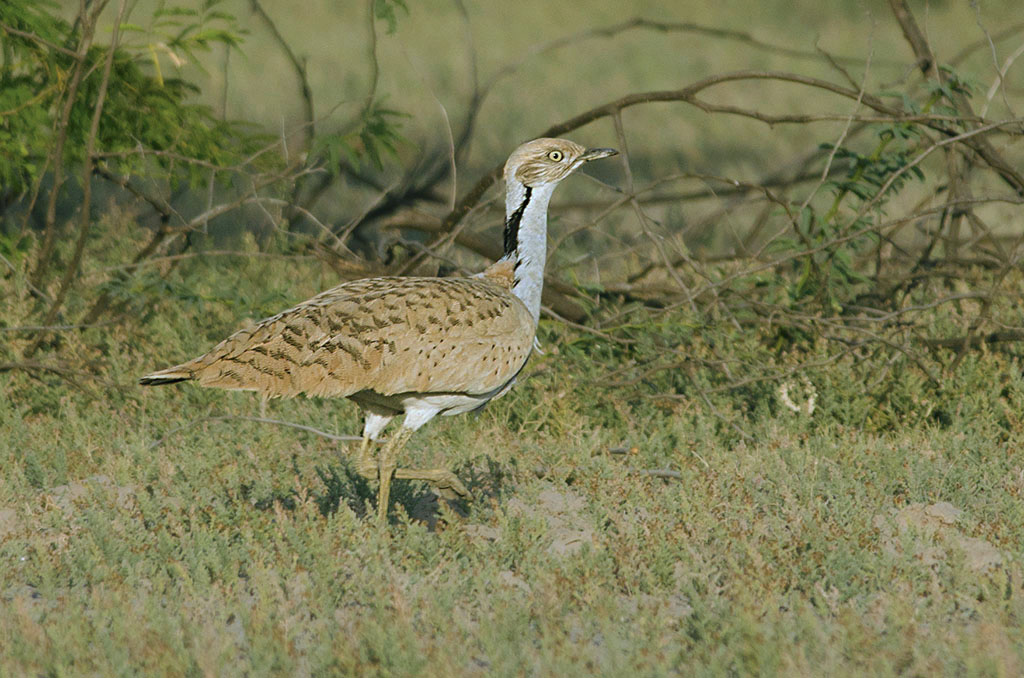
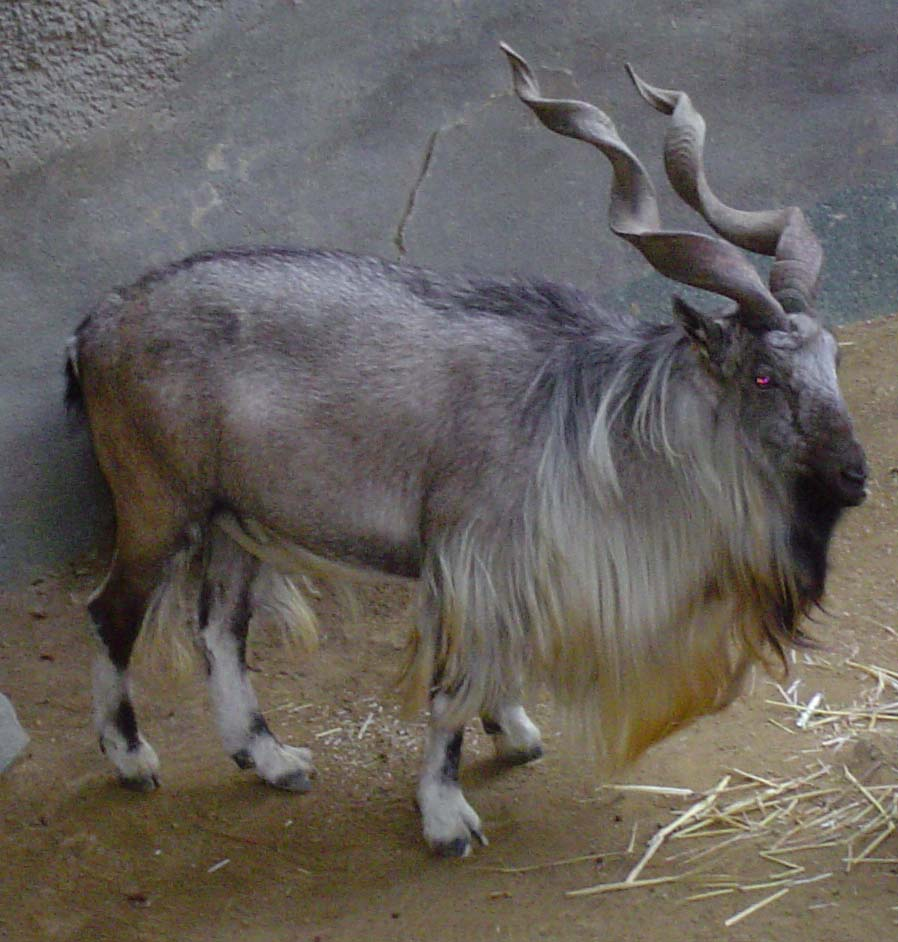
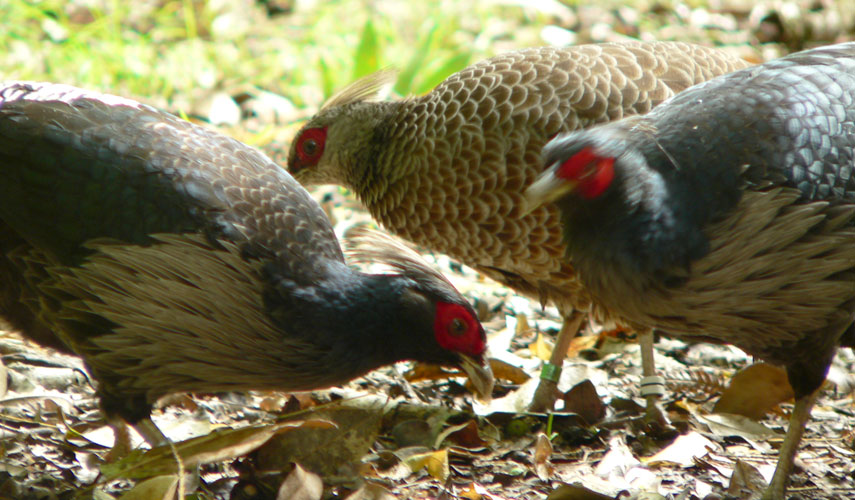
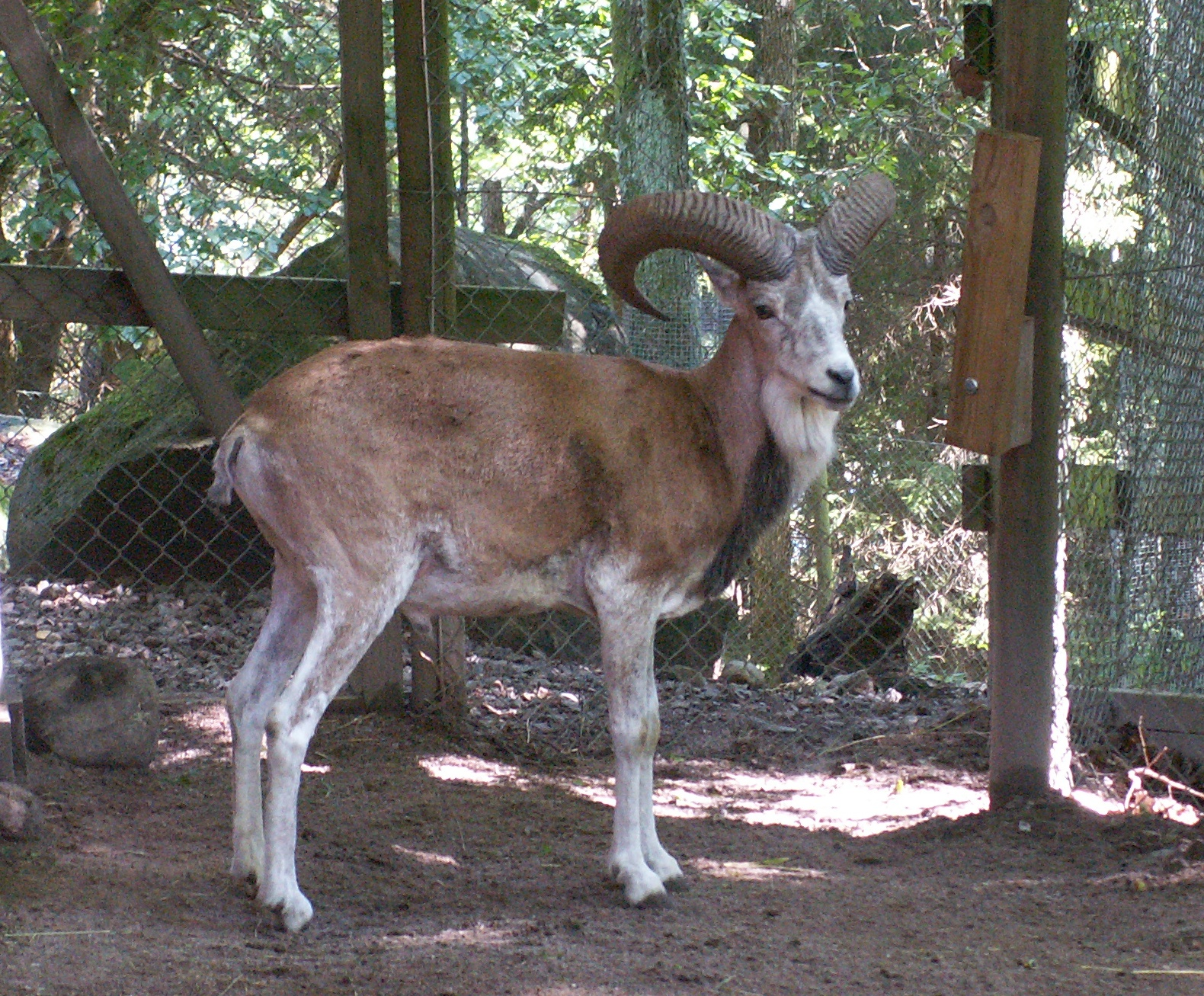
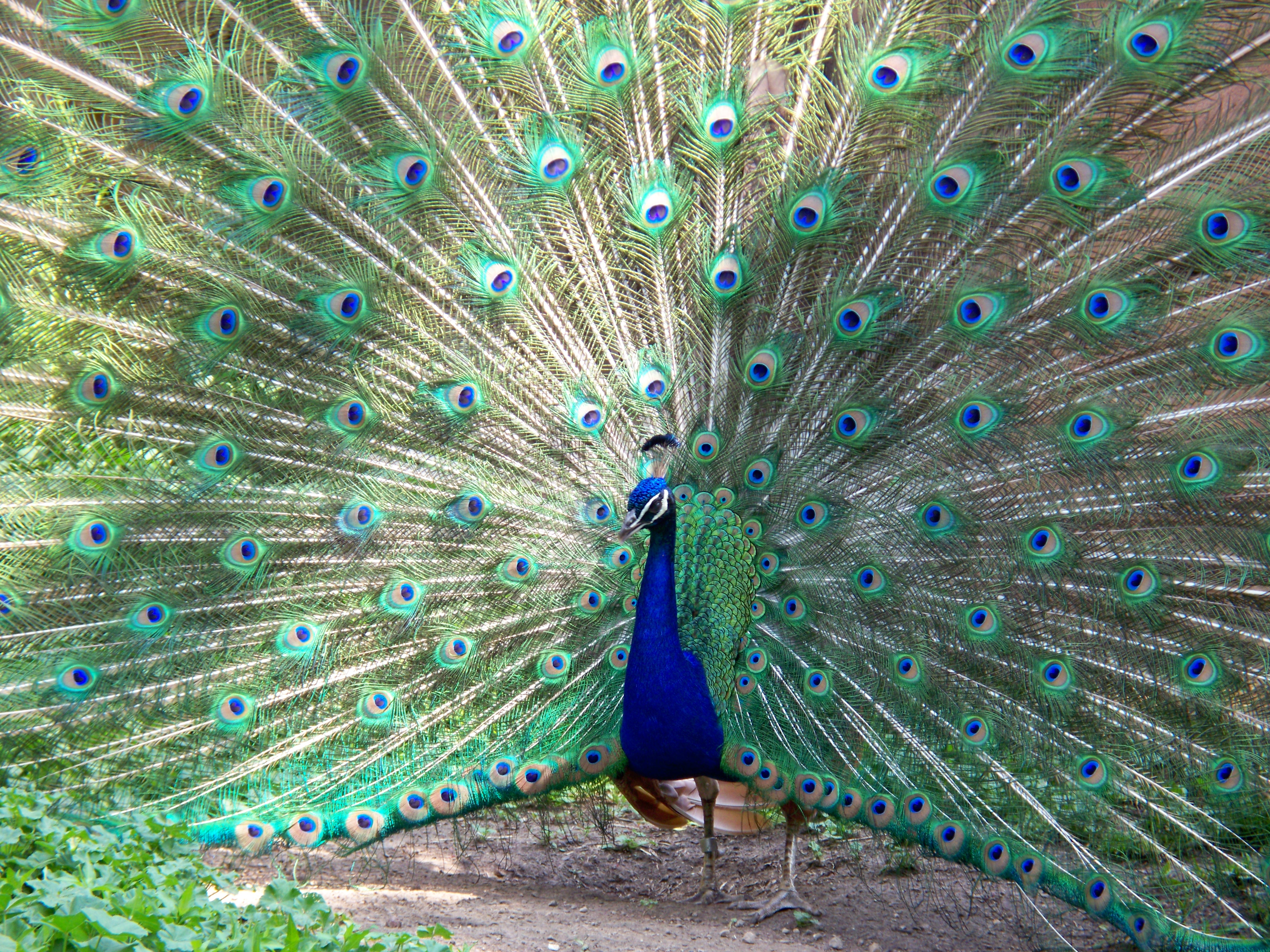
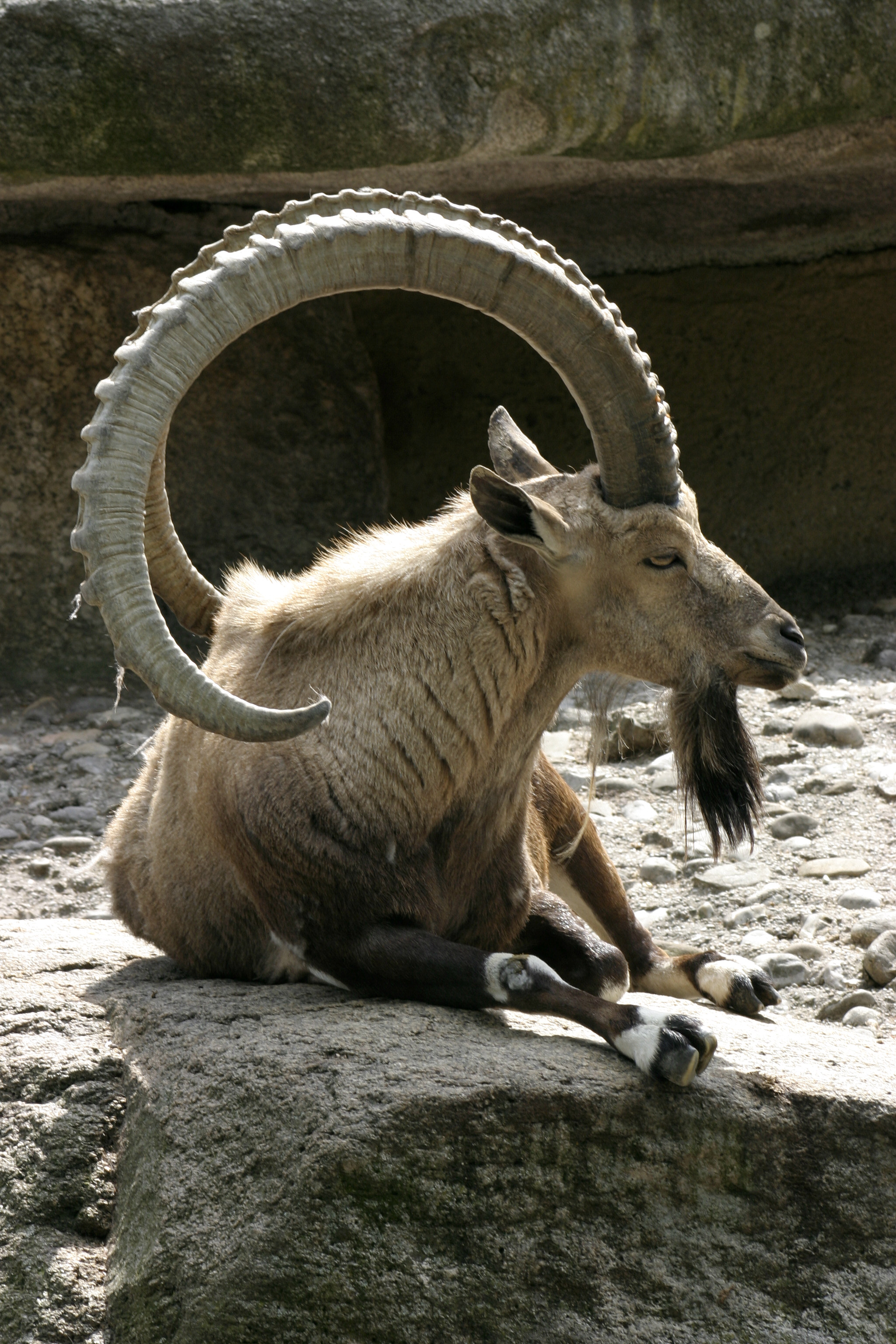
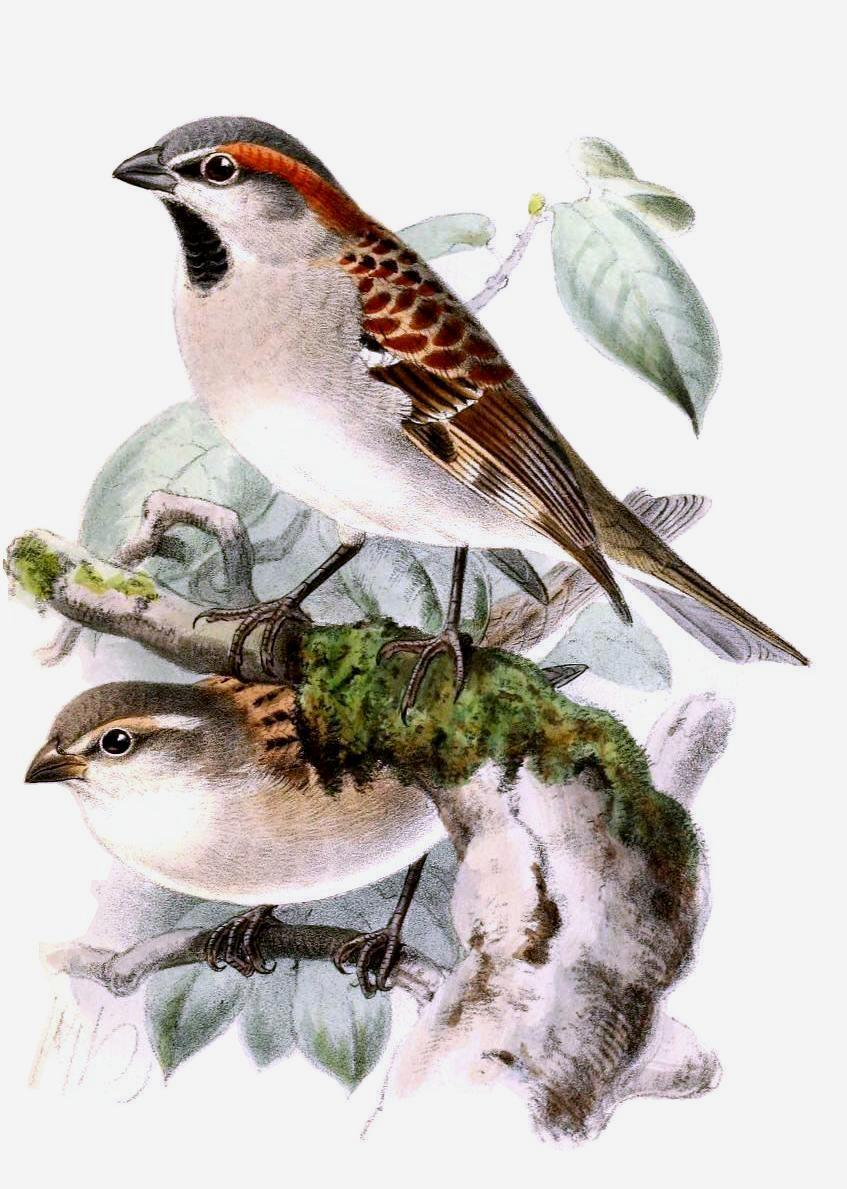
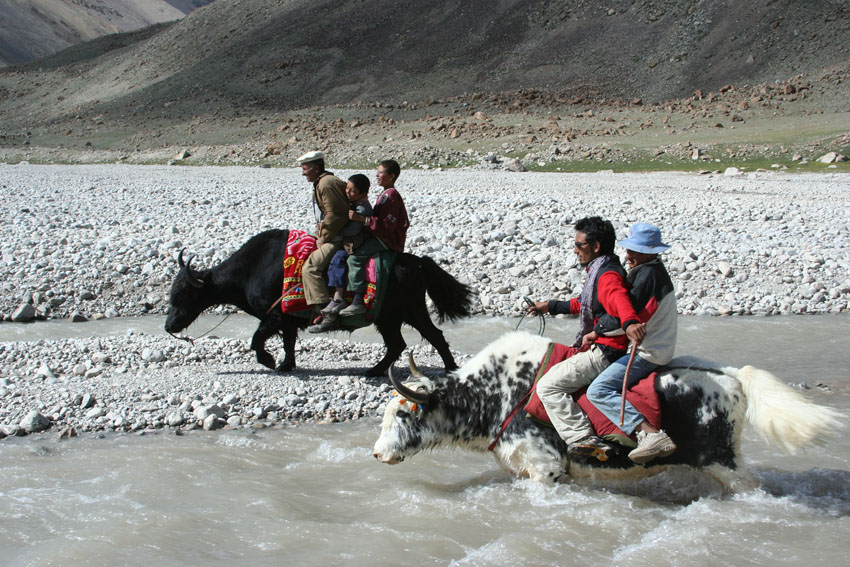
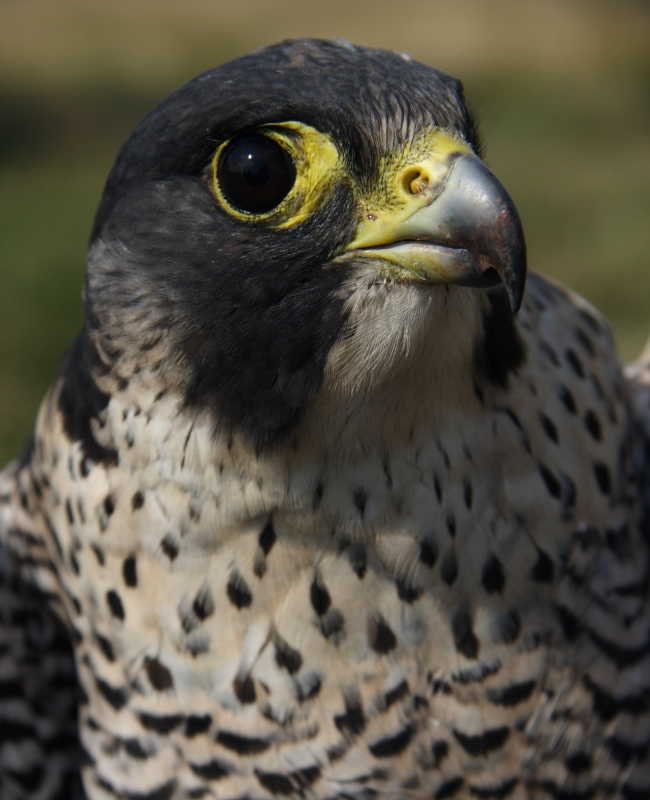
Country	National animal	Pictures
Pakistan	Markhor
Provinces, state and territories	Sub-national animals and birds of Pakistan
Islamabad Capital Territory	Rhesus macaque Rose-ringed parakeet
Balochistan	Dromedary camel MacQueen's bustard
Khyber Pakhtunkhwa	Kabul markhor White-crested kalij pheasant
The Punjab	Punjab urial Peafowl
Sindh	Sindh ibex Sind sparrow
Gilgit–Baltistan	Wild yak Shaheen falcon

=== Philippines ===
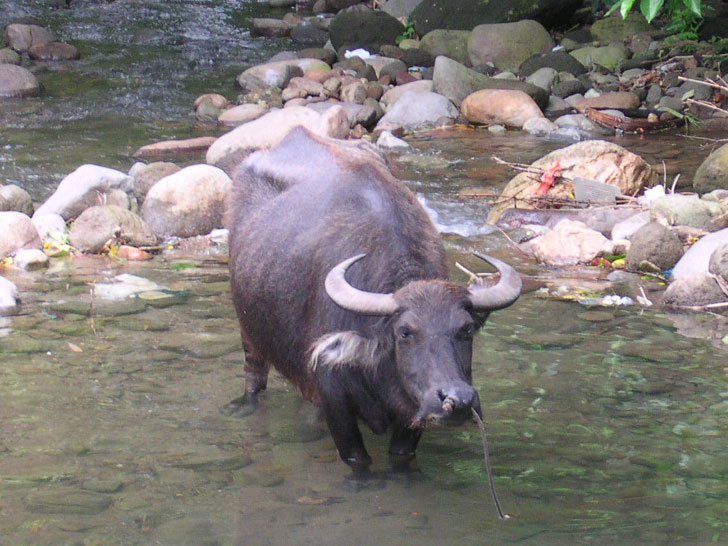
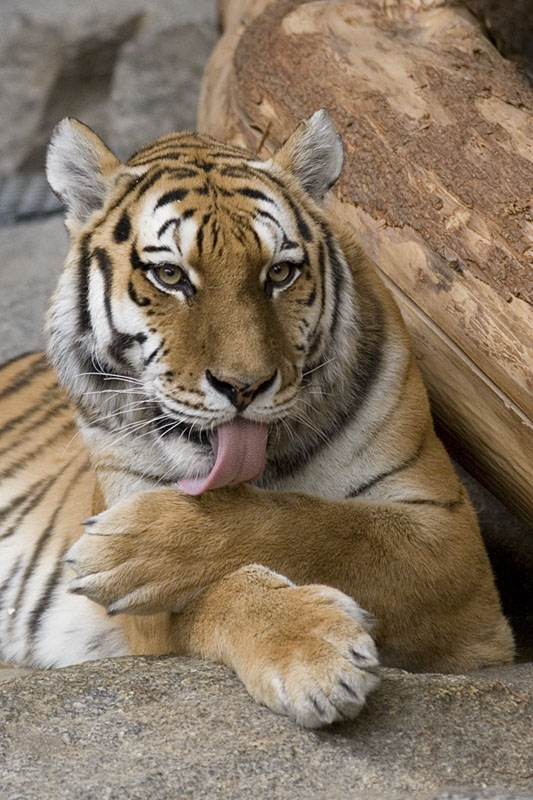
Country	National animal	Picture
Philippines	Carabao; Also the Philippine eagle, bangus
Province	Provincial animal
Cebu	Tiger
Bohol	Unicorn, red deer

=== Romania ===
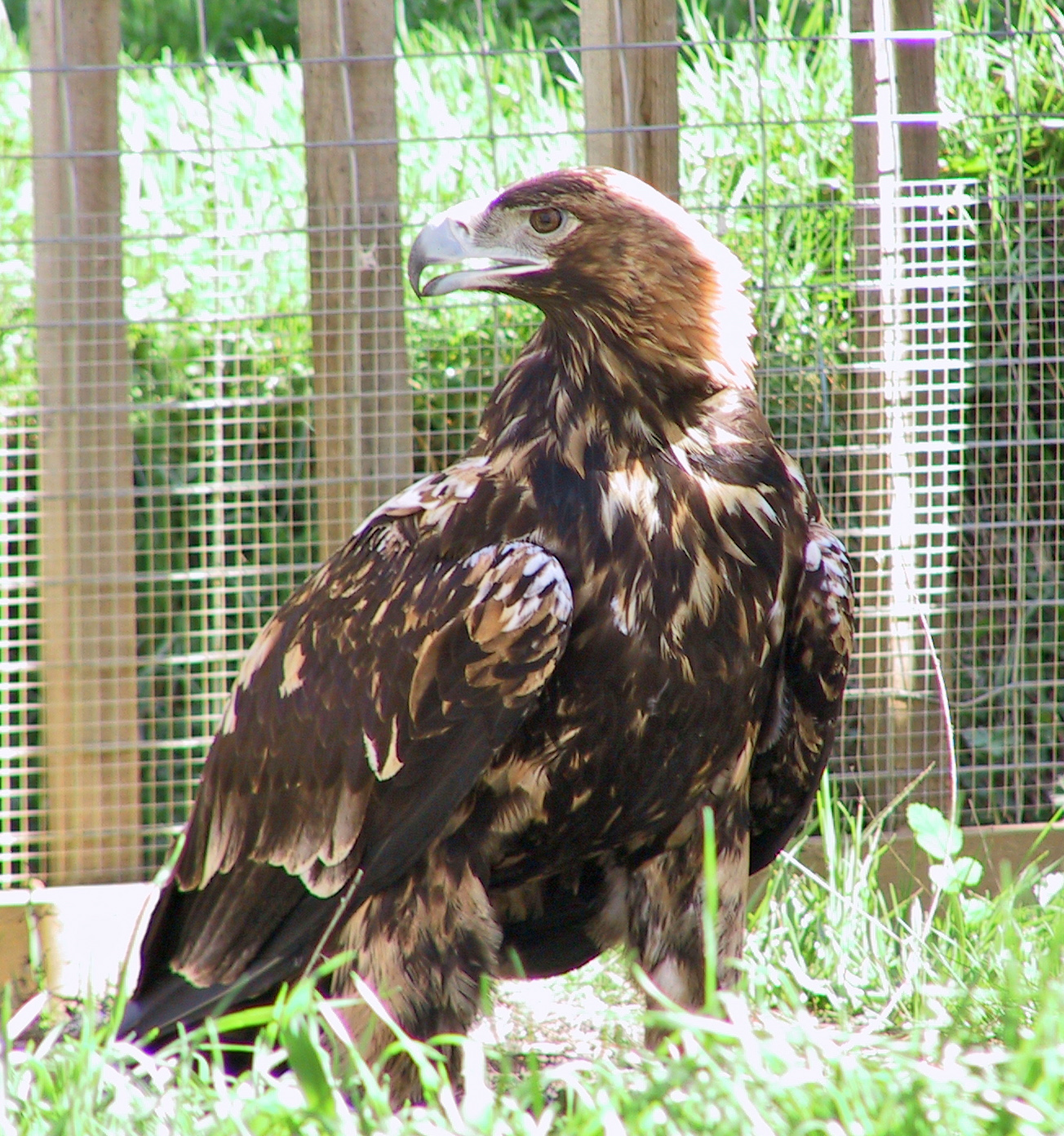
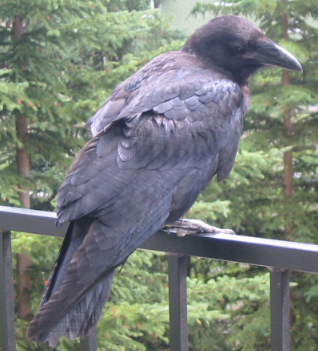
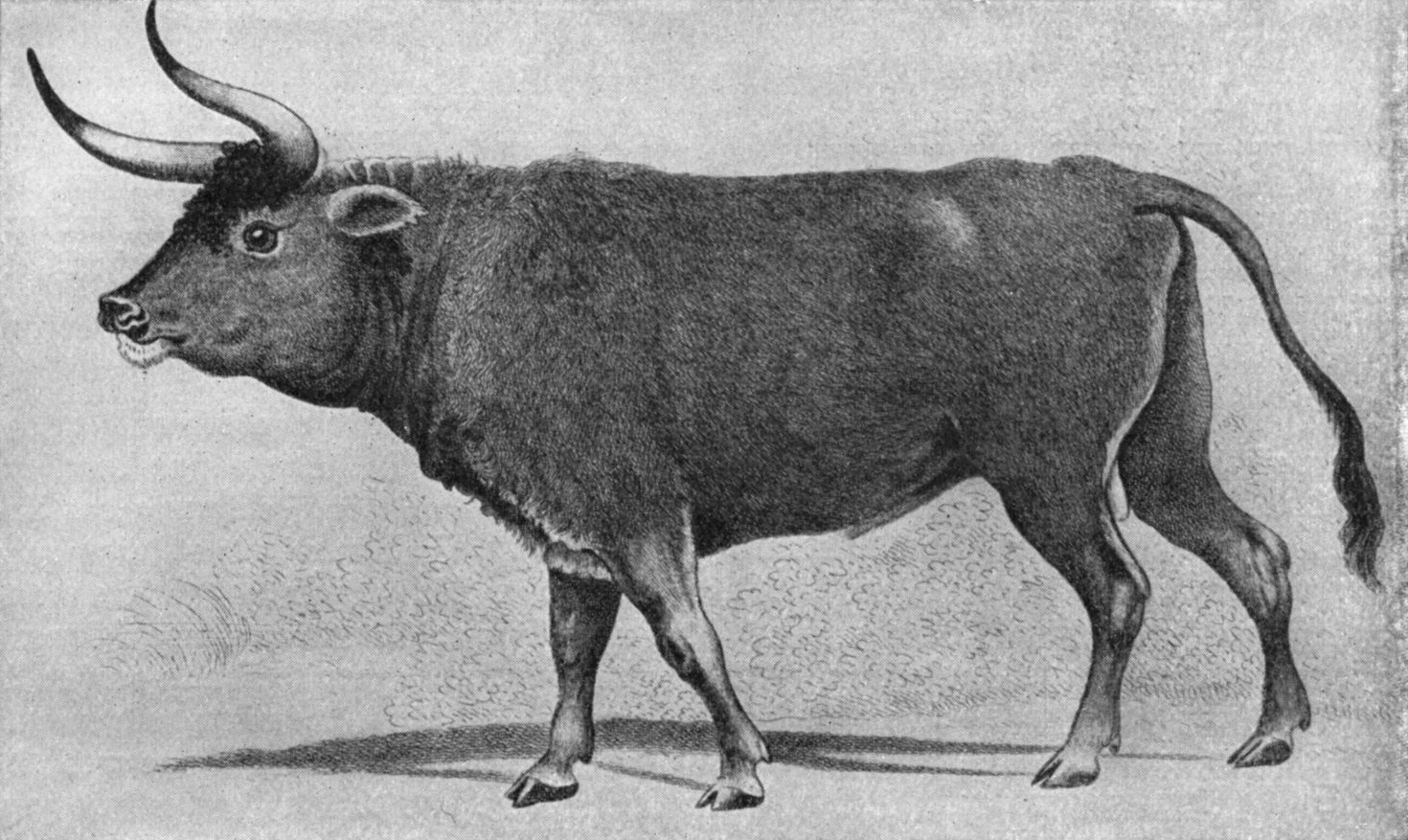
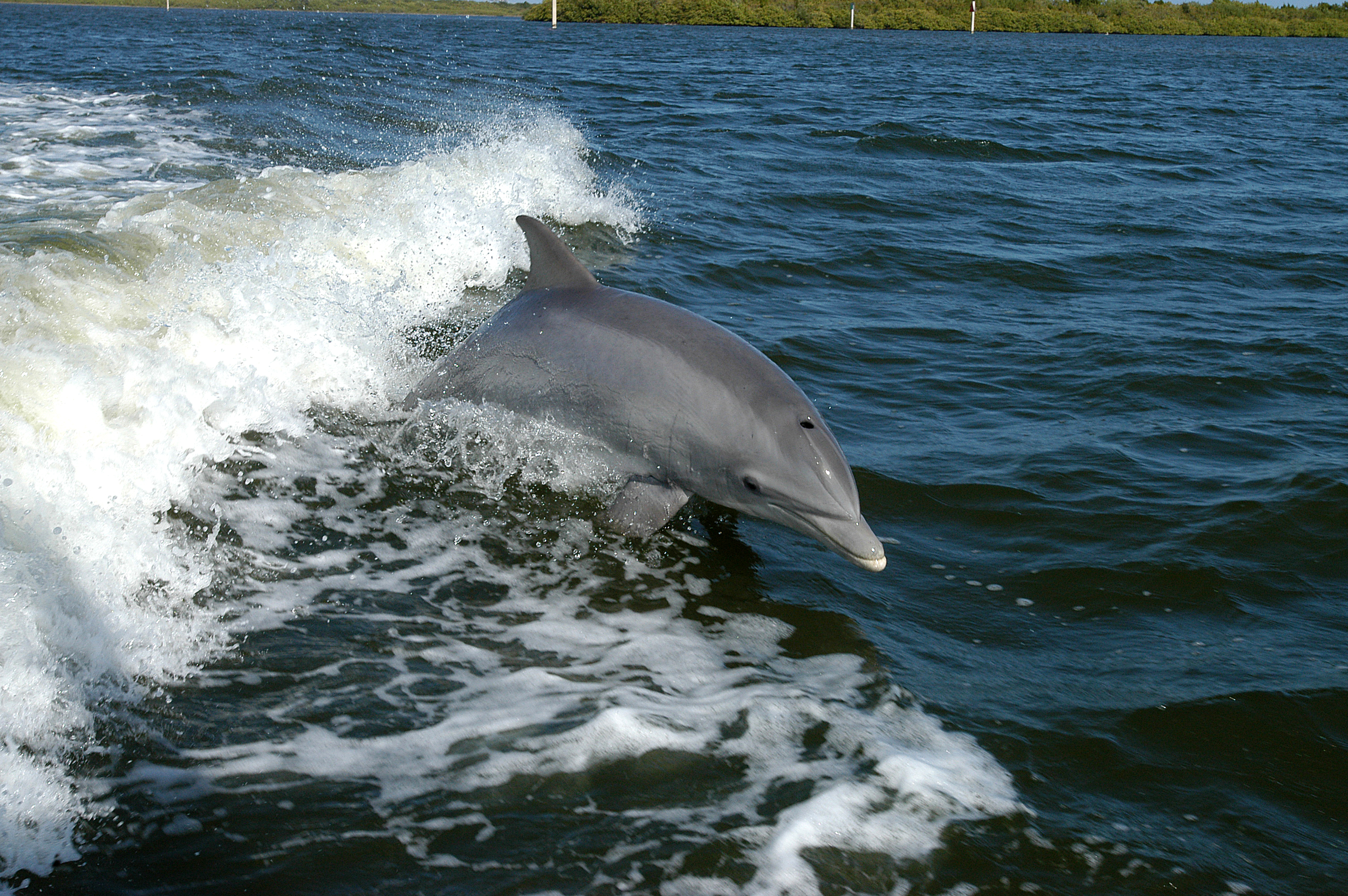
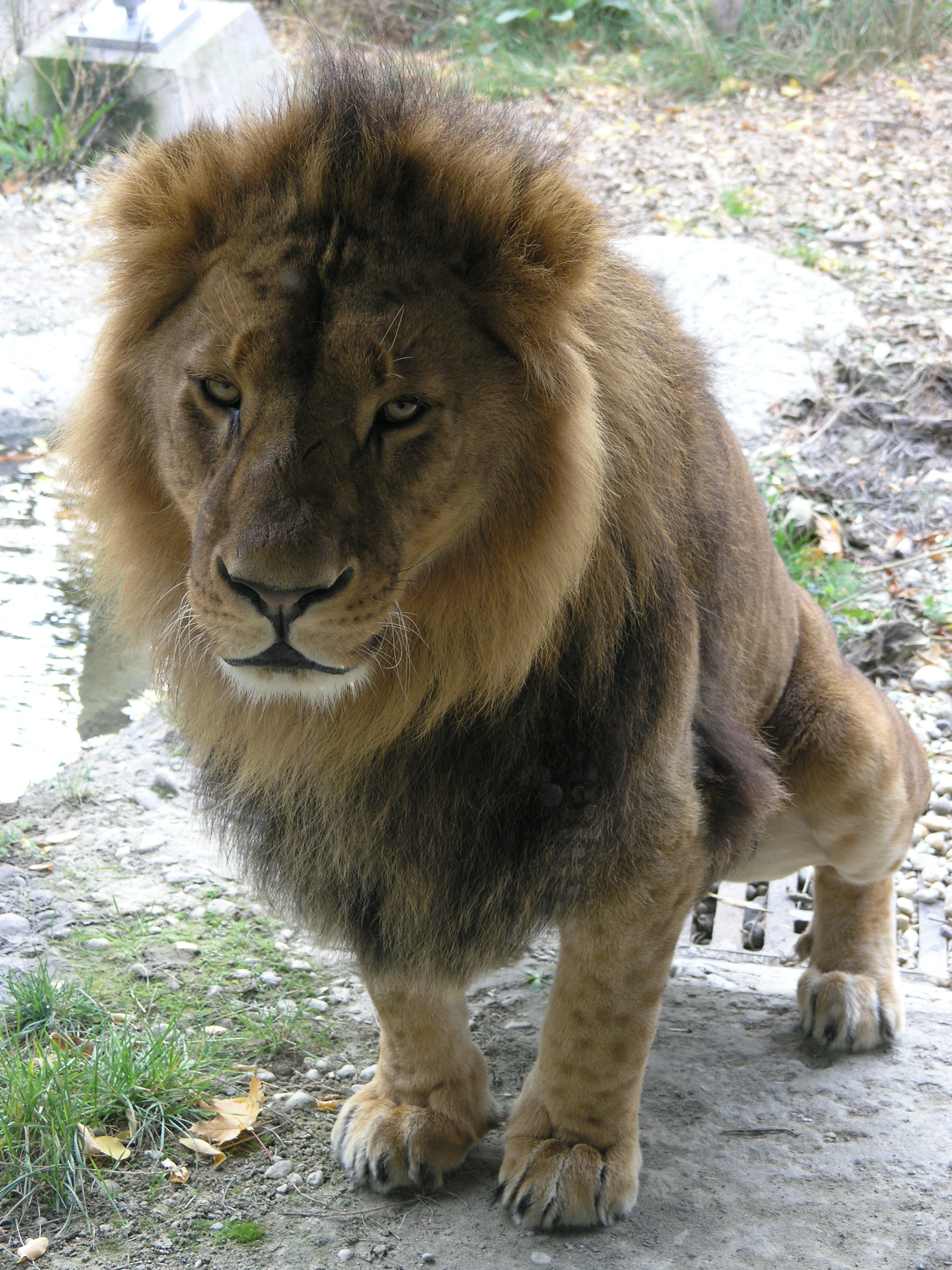
Historic region	National animal
Transylvania	Eagle
Muntenia	Raven
Moldova	Aurochs
Northern Dobruja	Dolphin
Banat	Lion

=== South Korea ===
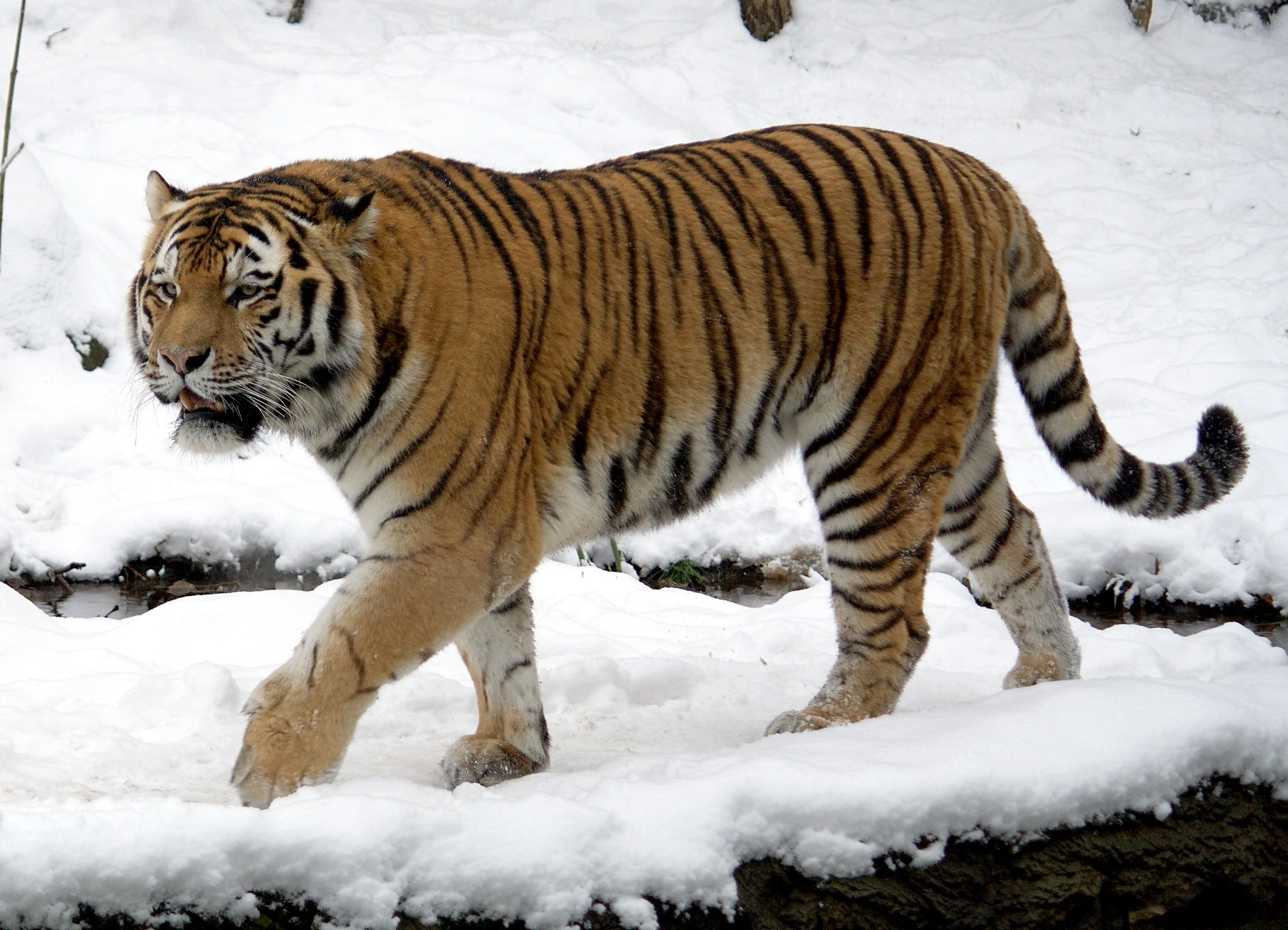
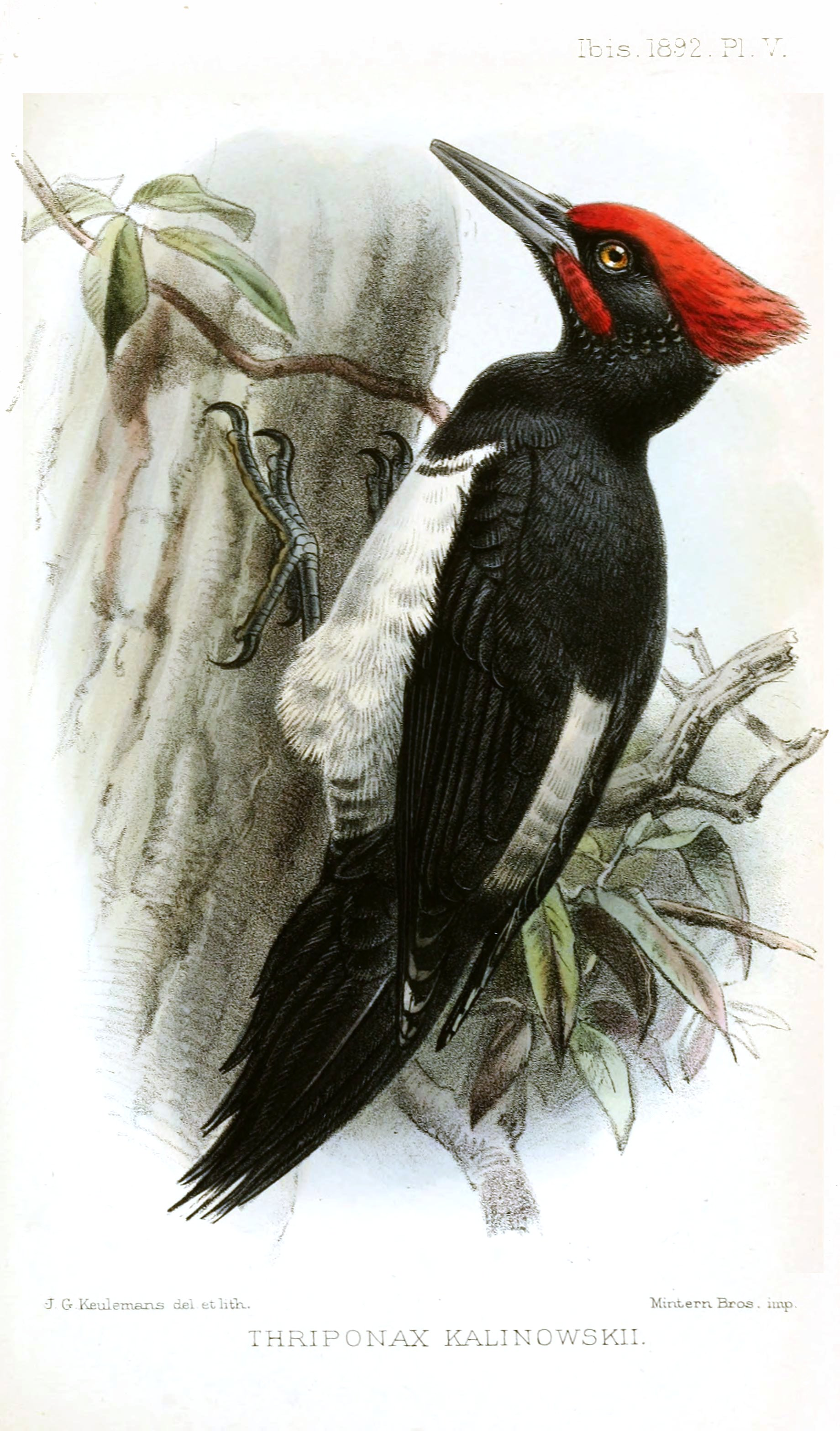
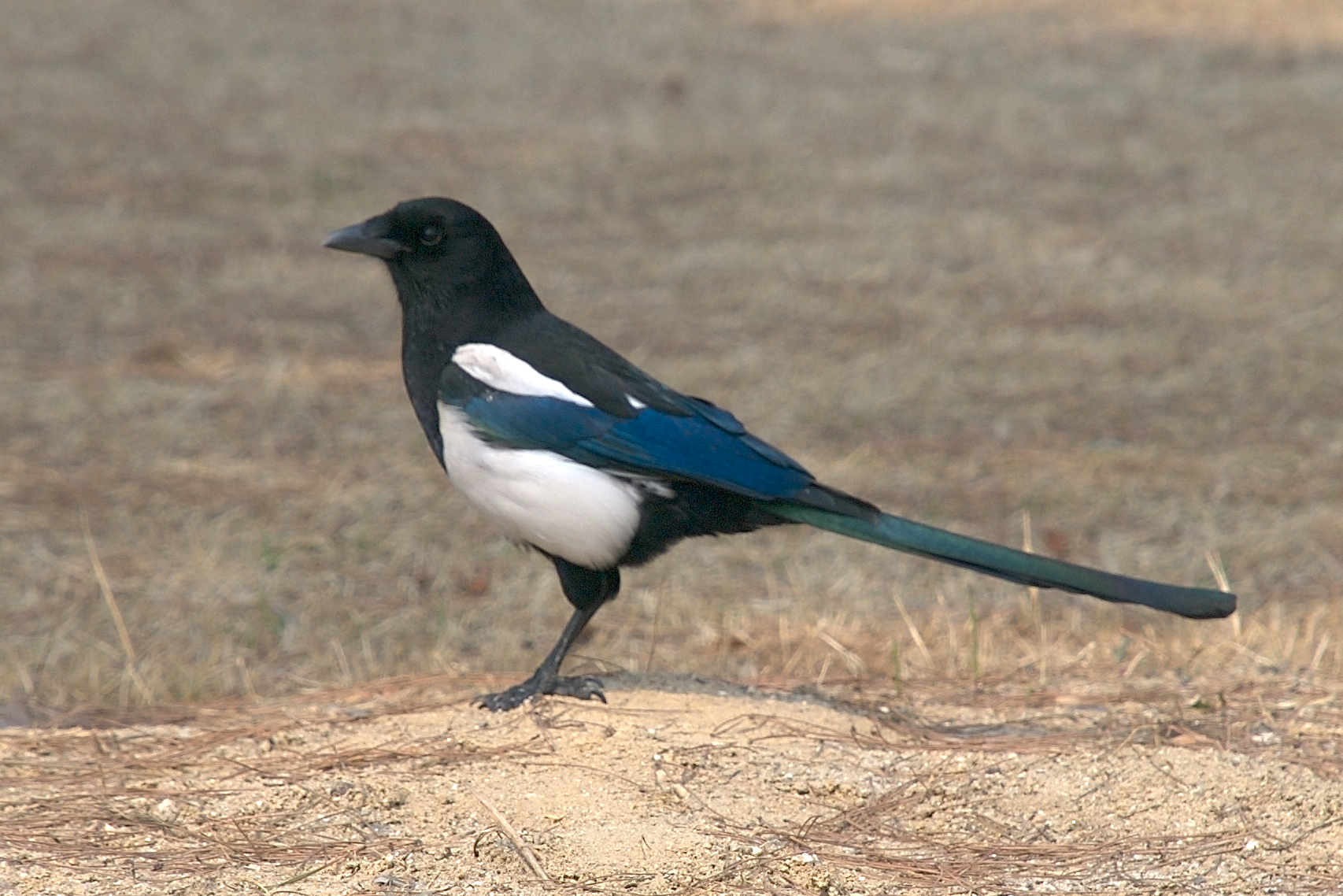
Country	National animal
South Korea	Siberian tiger
Province	Provincial animal
Jeju Province	Woodpecker
Seoul	Korean magpie

=== Spain ===
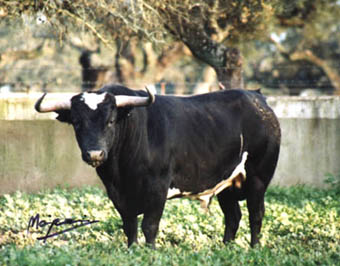
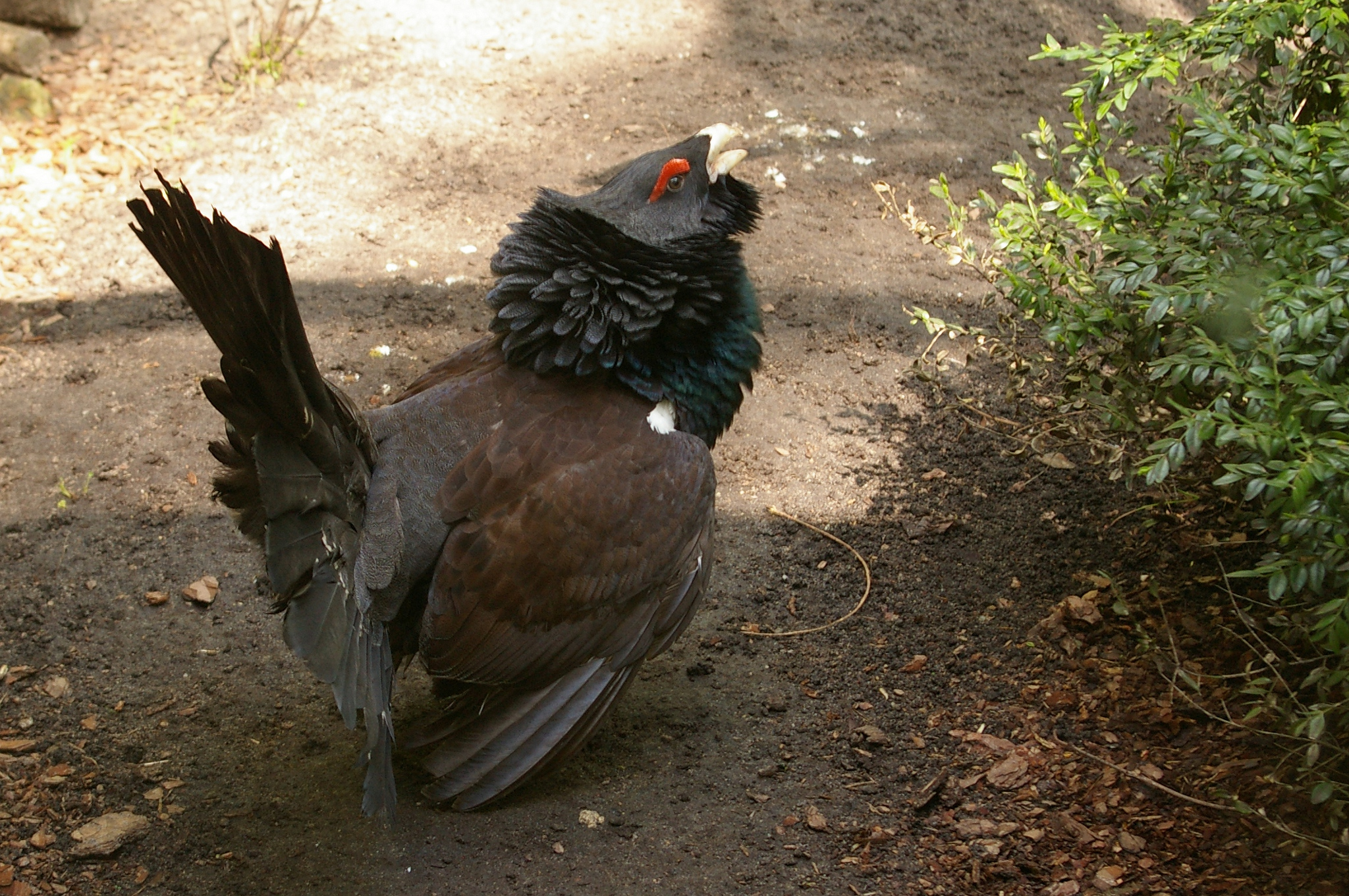
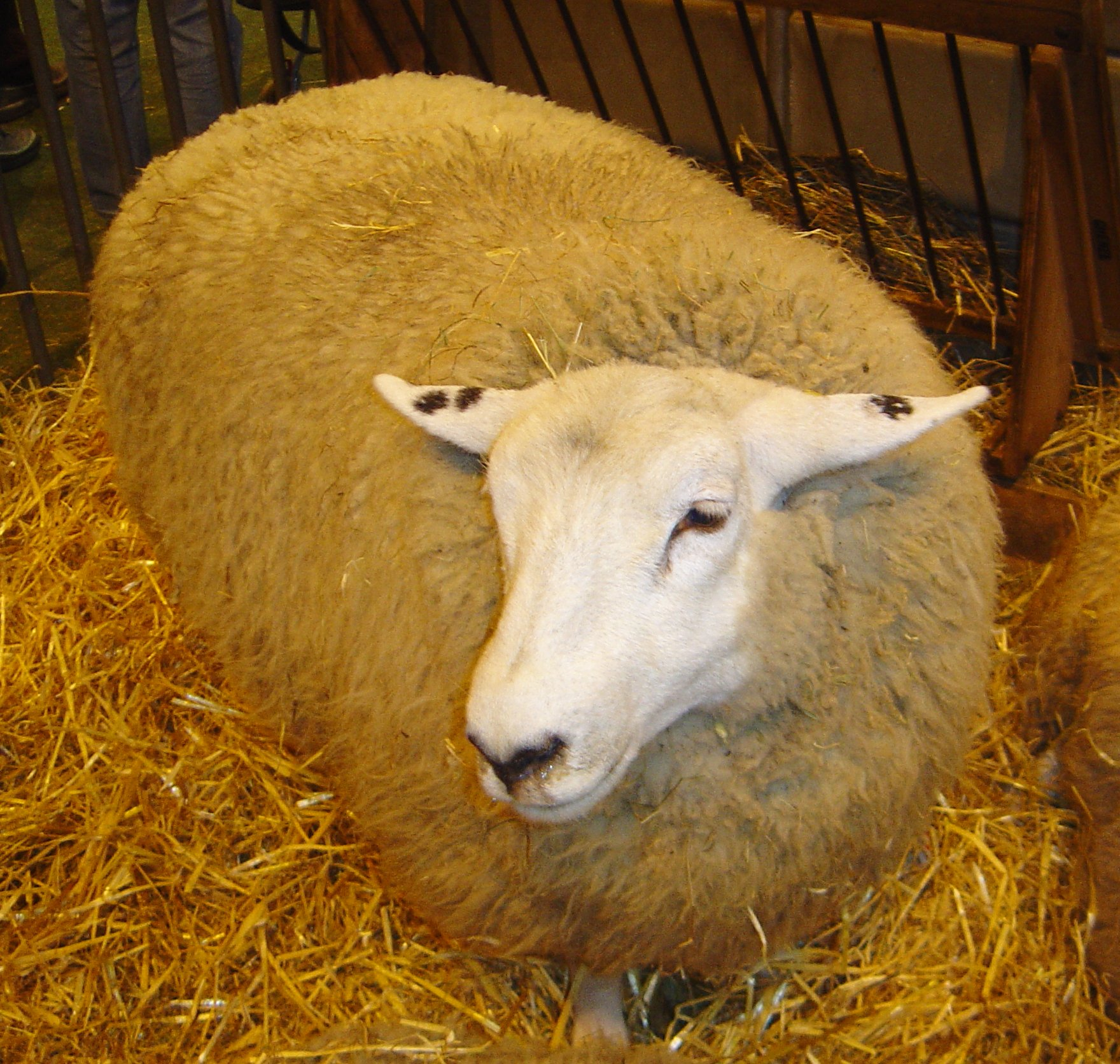
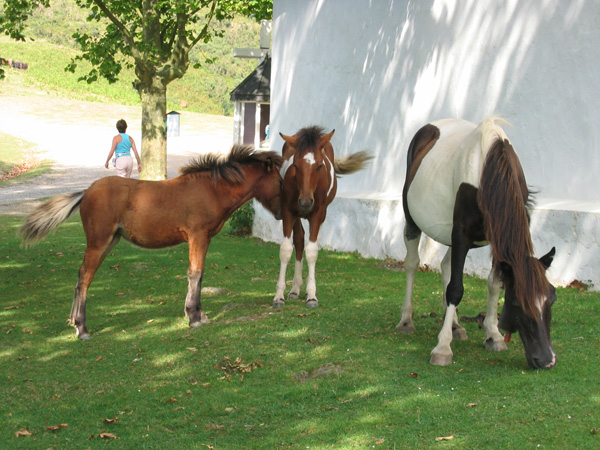
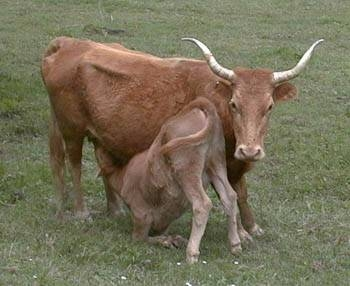
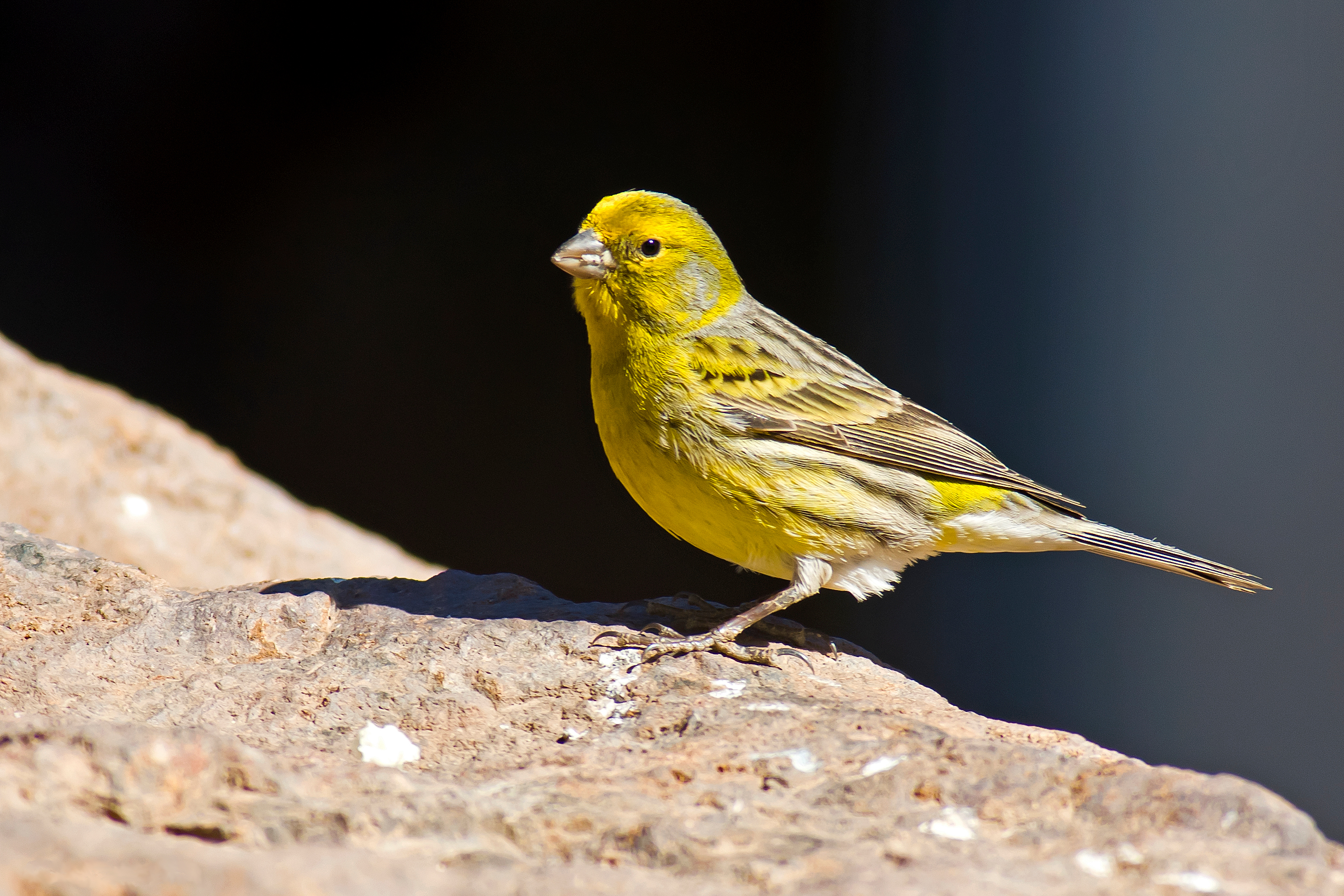
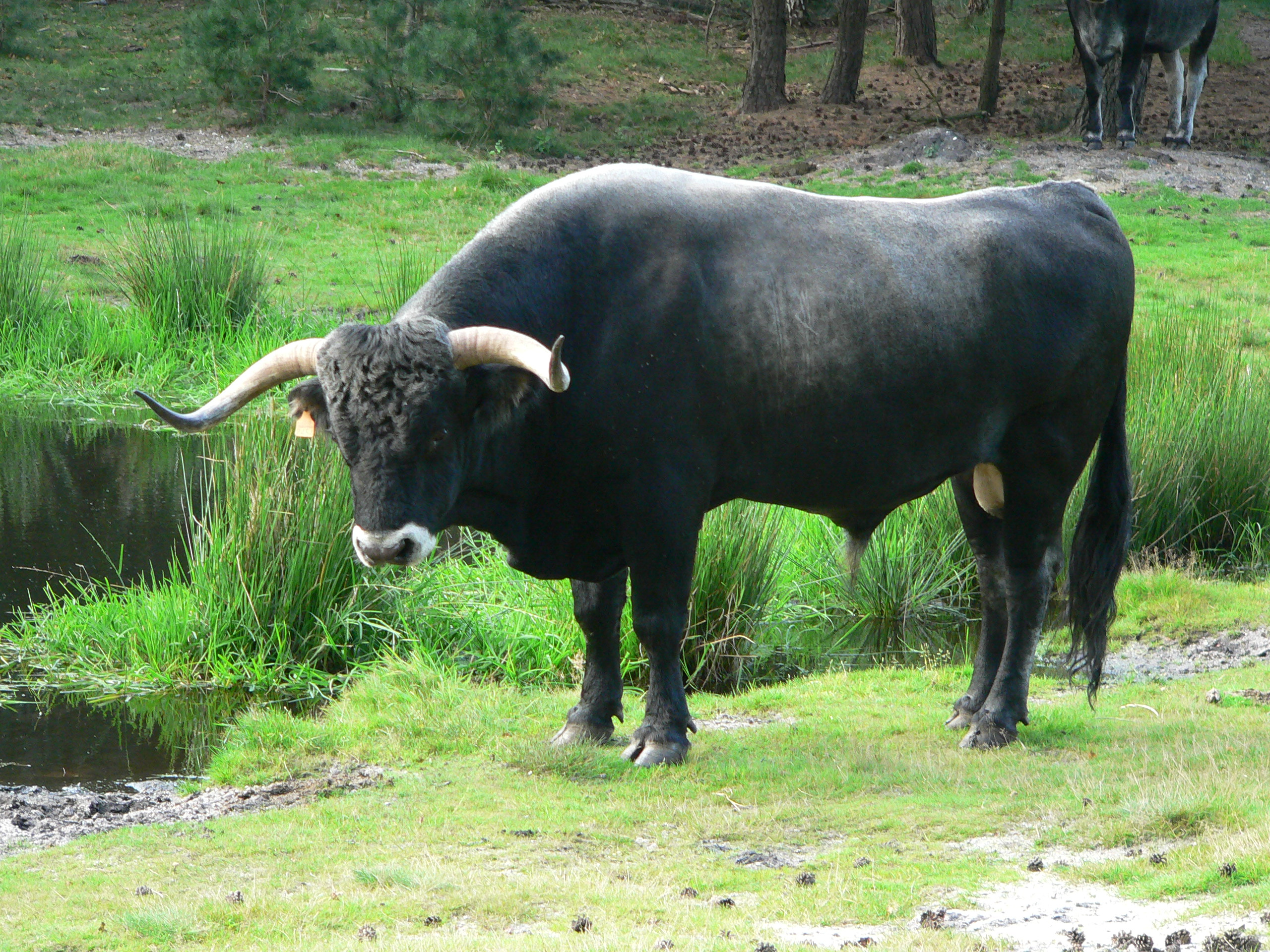
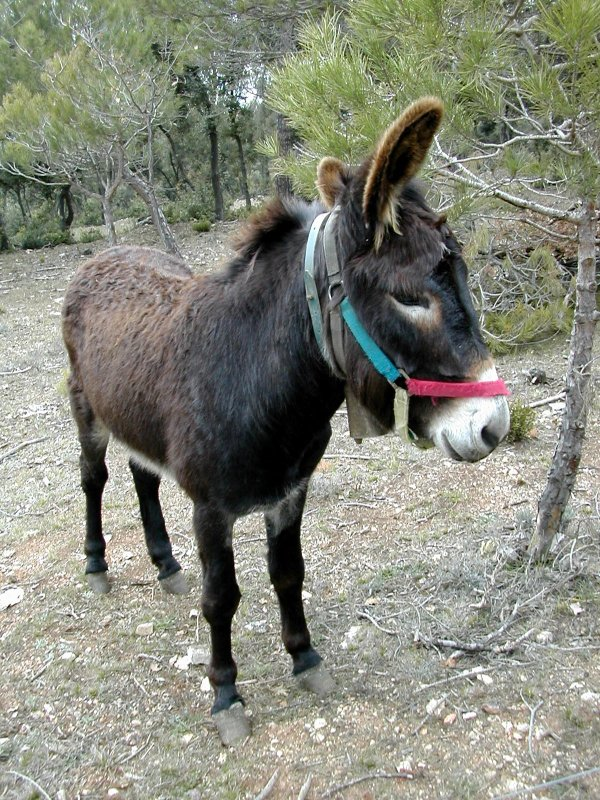
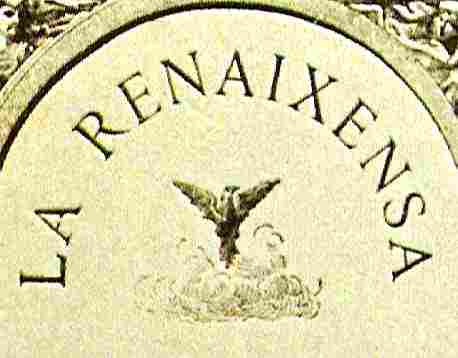
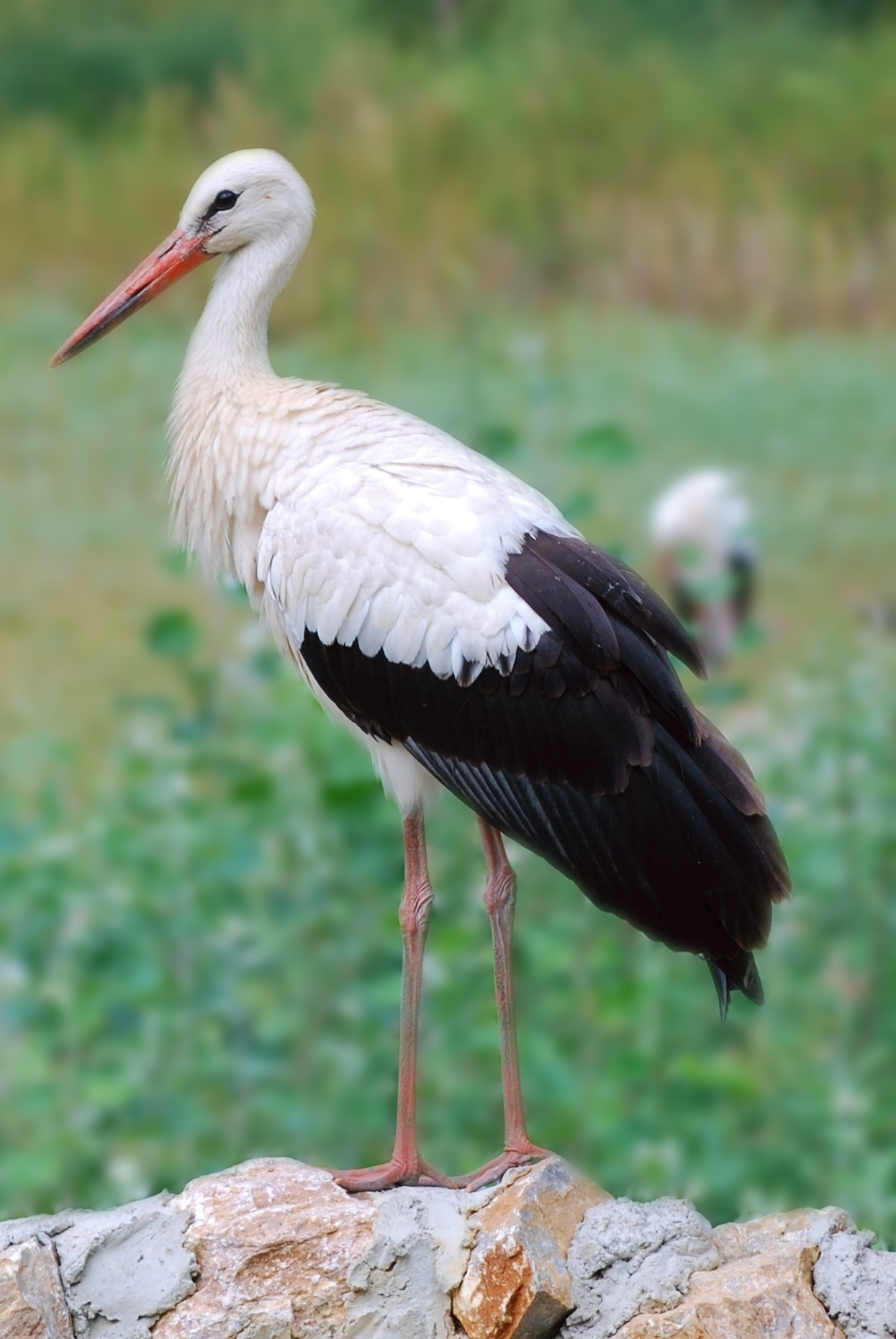
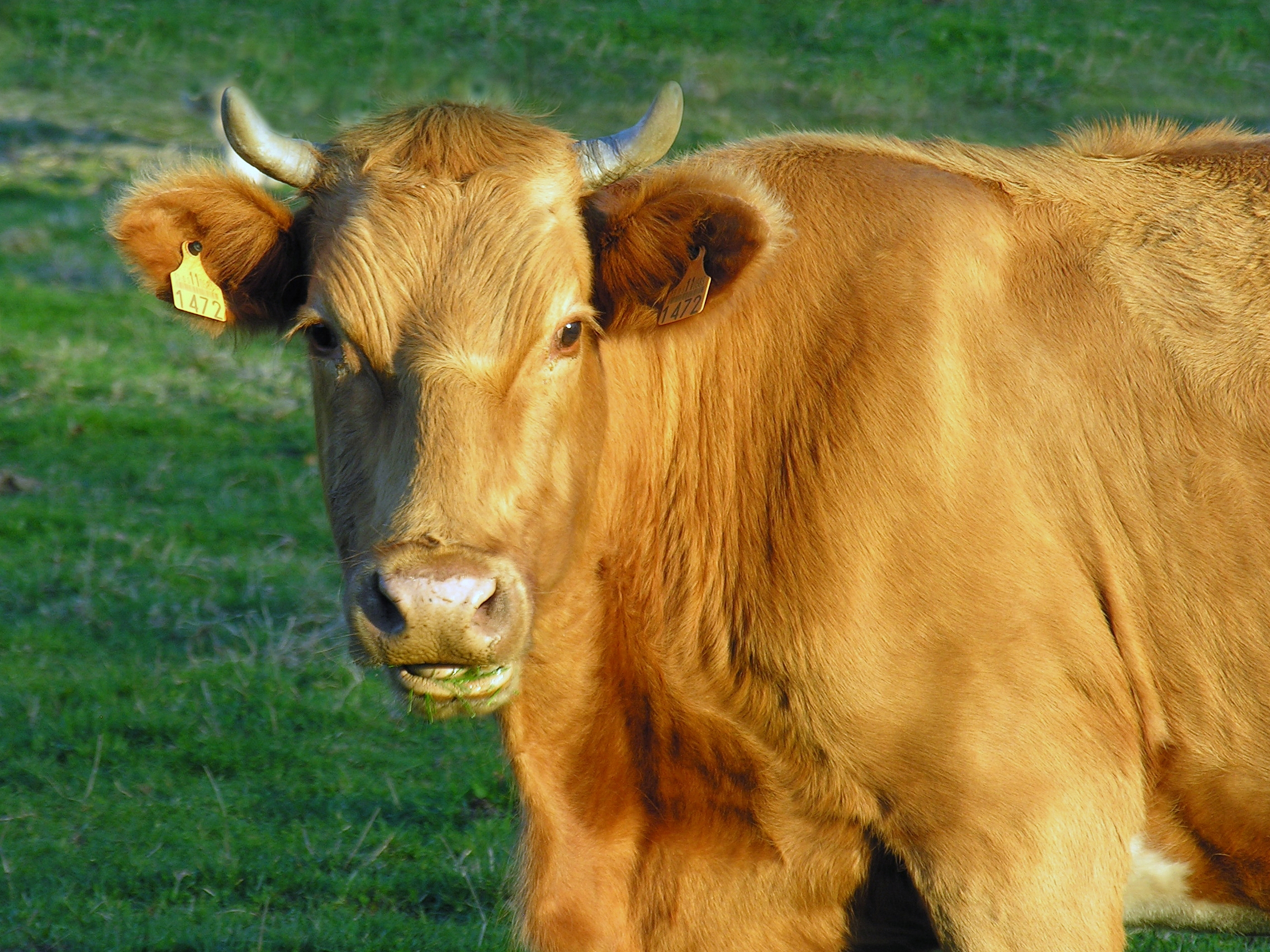
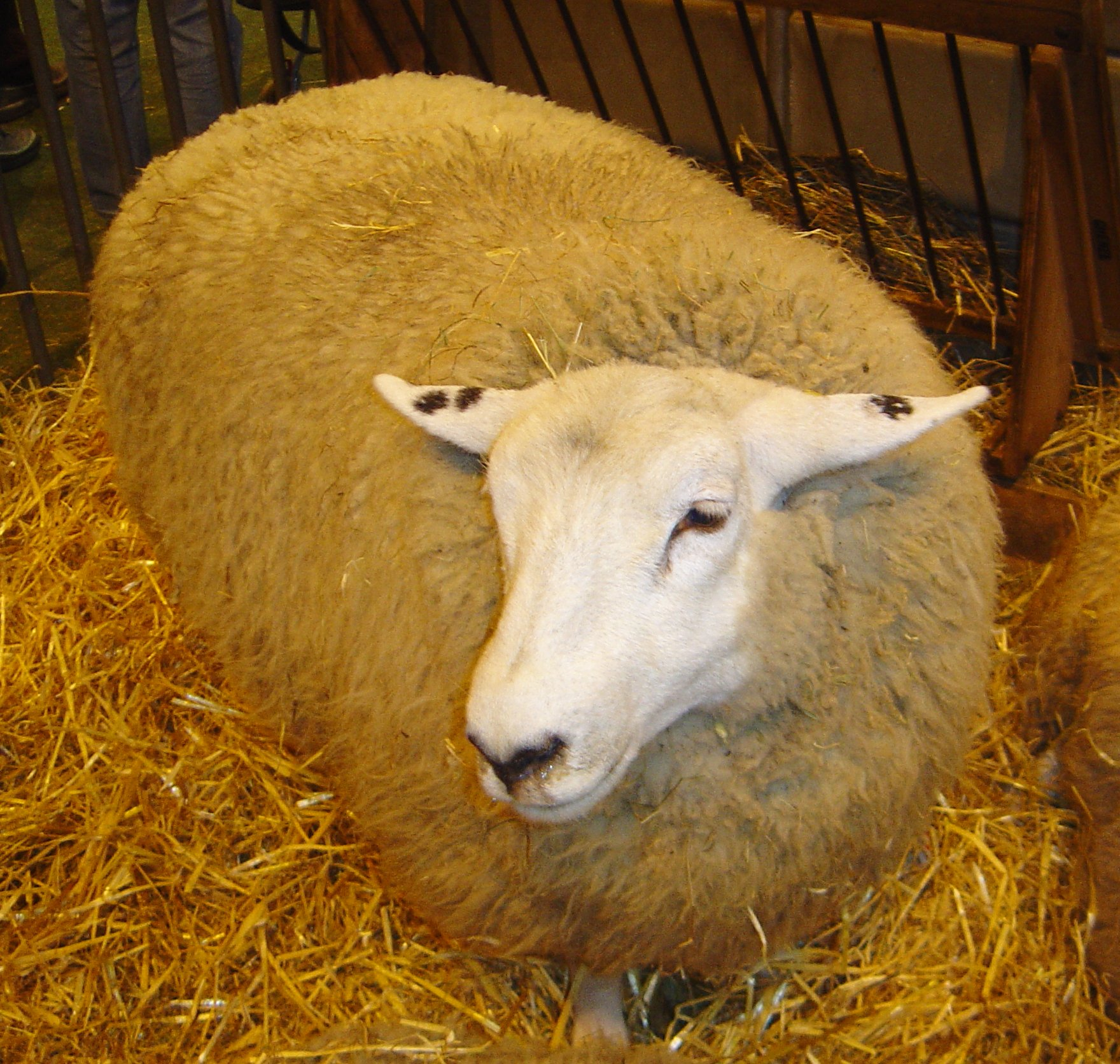
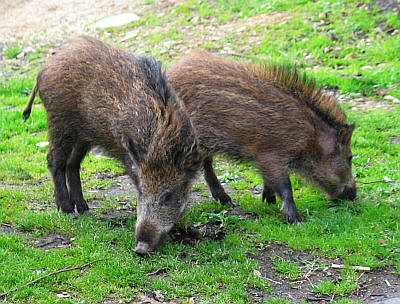
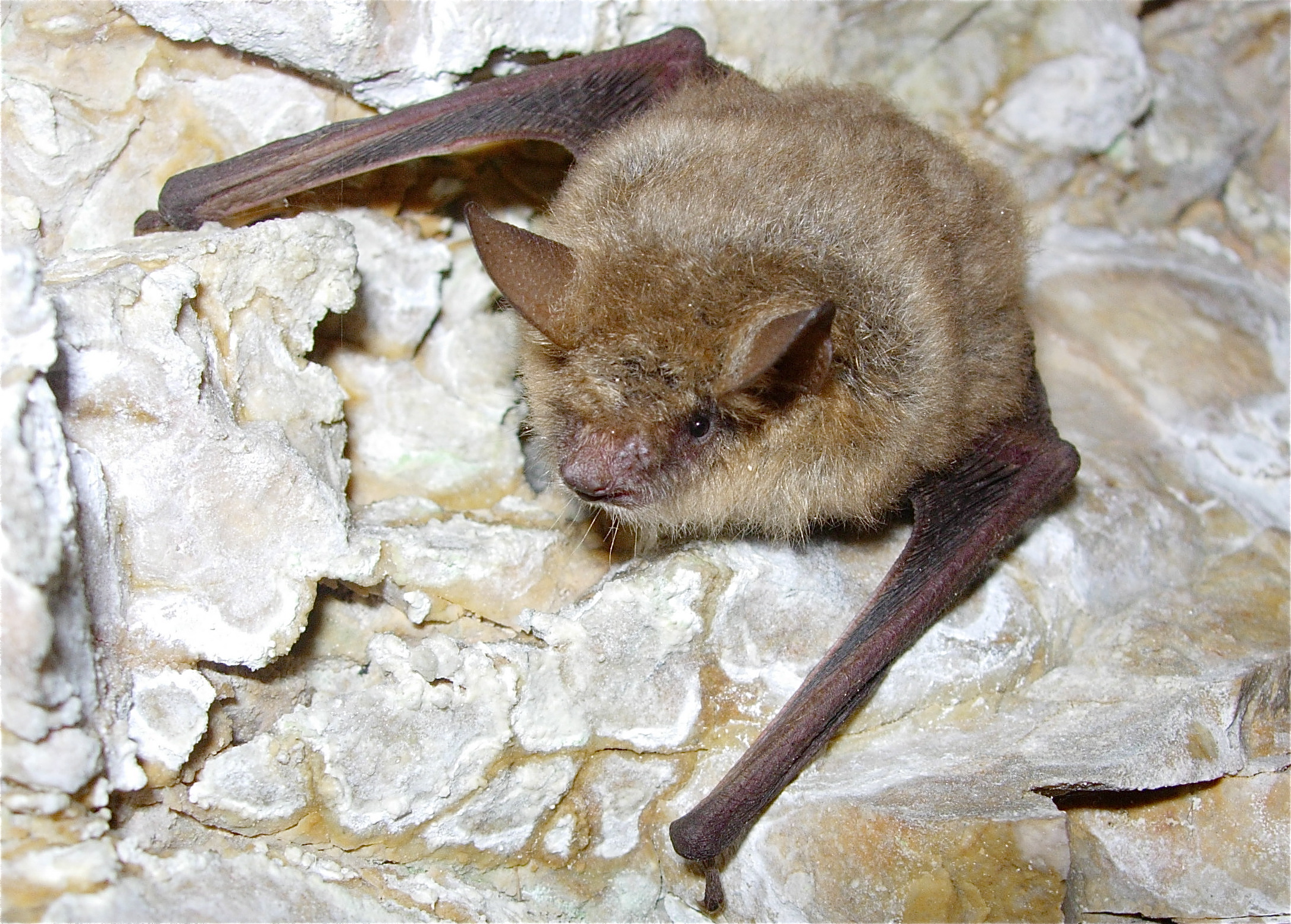
Country	National animal
Spain	Bull
Autonomous community	Community animal
Asturias	Capercaillie
Basque Country	Latxa sheep
Basque Country	Pottoka
Basque Country	Betizu cow
Canary Islands	Atlantic canary
Cantabria	Tudanca cow
Catalonia	Catalan donkey
Catalonia	Phoenix
Catalonia	Wyvern
Ceuta	Atlantic mackerel
Extremadura	White stork
Galicia	Blonde Galician cow
Navarre	Latxa sheep
Navarre	Boar
Valencian Community	Bat

=== Sweden ===
Province	Provincial animal	Picture
Blekinge	Stag beetle	
Bohuslän	Harbor seal	
Dalarna	Eagle-owl	
Dalsland	Raven	
Gotland	Hedgehog	
Gästrikland	Wood grouse	
Halland	Salmon	
Hälsingland	Lynx	
Härjedalen	Brown bear	
Jämtland	Moose	
Lapland	Arctic fox	
Medelpad	Mountain hare	
Norrbotten	Siberian jay	
Närke	Dormouse	
Skåne	Red deer	
Småland	Otter	
Södermanland	Osprey	
Uppland	White-tailed eagle	
Värmland	Wolf	
Västerbotten	Curlew	
Västergötland	Crane	
Västmanland	Roe deer	
Ångermanland	Beaver	
Öland	Nightingale	
Östergötland	Mute swan	

=== Taiwan ===
Special municipalities, counties, and cities	animal	Picture
Taipei	Taiwan blue magpie	
New Taipei City	Little egret	
Keelung	Black kite	
Keelung	black porgy	
Penghu	Oriental skylark	
Penghu	Longfin grouper	

=== United Kingdom ===
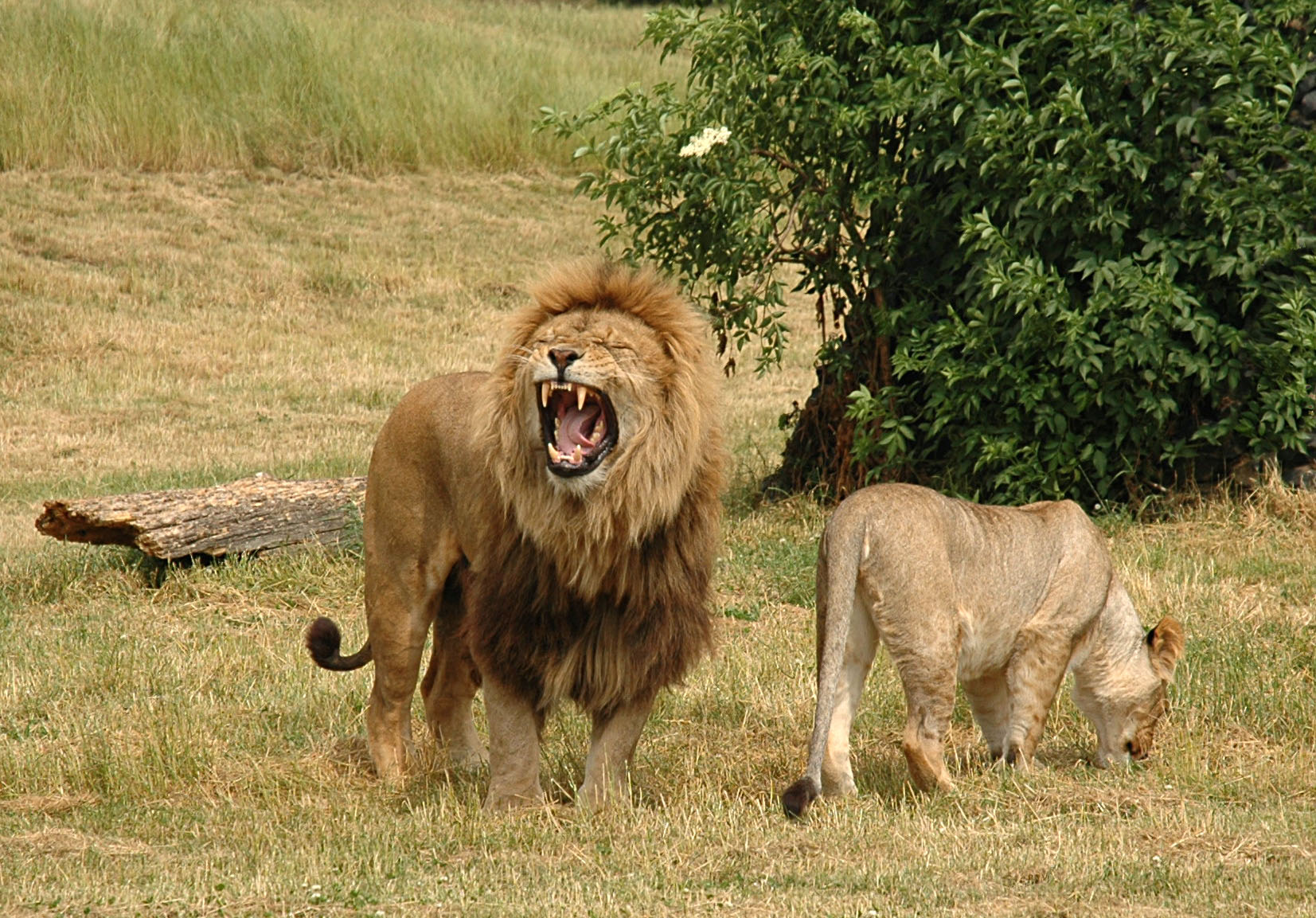
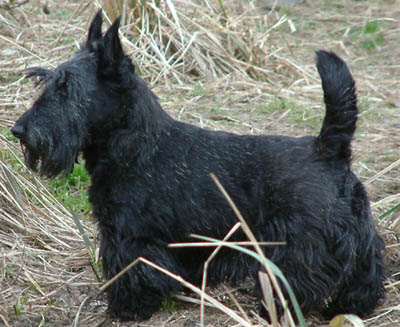
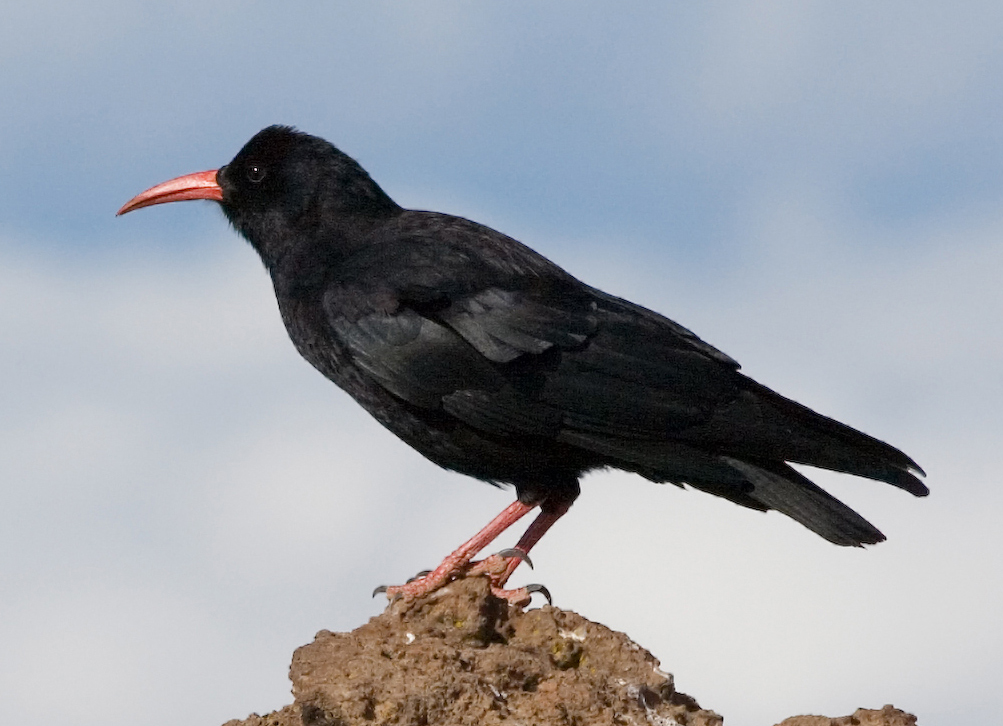
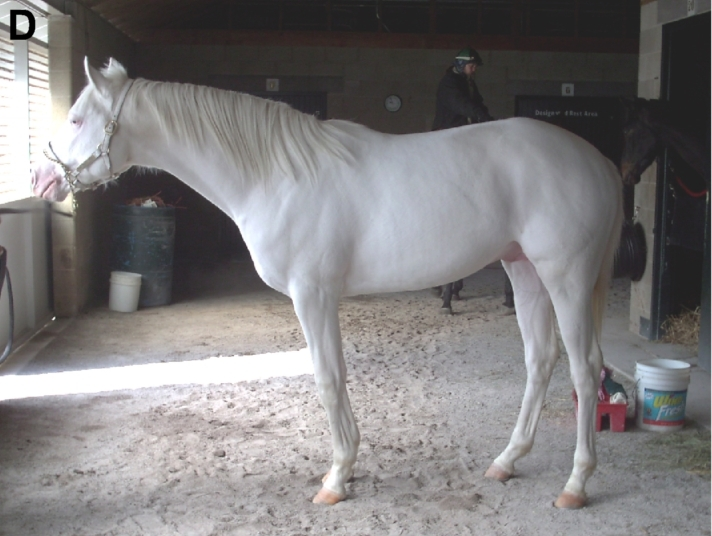
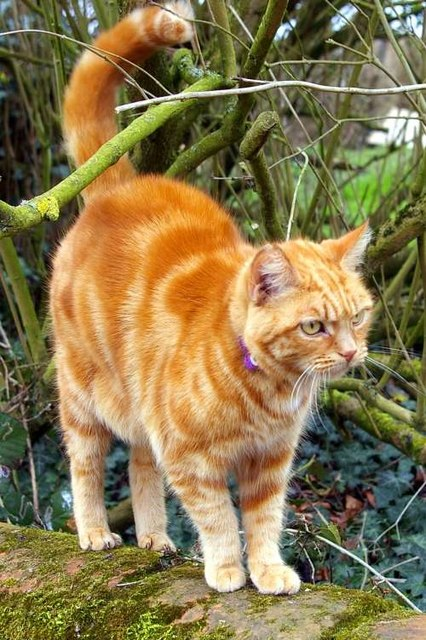
Subdivision	Animal	Picture
Home nations
England	Lion
Scotland	Unicorn
Scotland	Scottish Terrier
Wales	Red dragon
Counties
Cornwall	Cornish chough
Kent	White horse
Sussex	Martlet
Essex	Cat

Crown Dependencies
Dependecy		Animal Nickname	Picture
Jersey		Crapaud (toads)
Bailiwick of Guernsey	Guernsey	Les ânes (donkeys)
Bailiwick of Guernsey	Alderney	vaques (cows)
Bailiwick of Guernsey	Alderney	Lapins (rabbits)
Bailiwick of Guernsey	Sark	corbin (crows)

== See also ==
- Floral emblem
- List of national birds
- National emblem
