= Flora of Pakistan =

Native flora

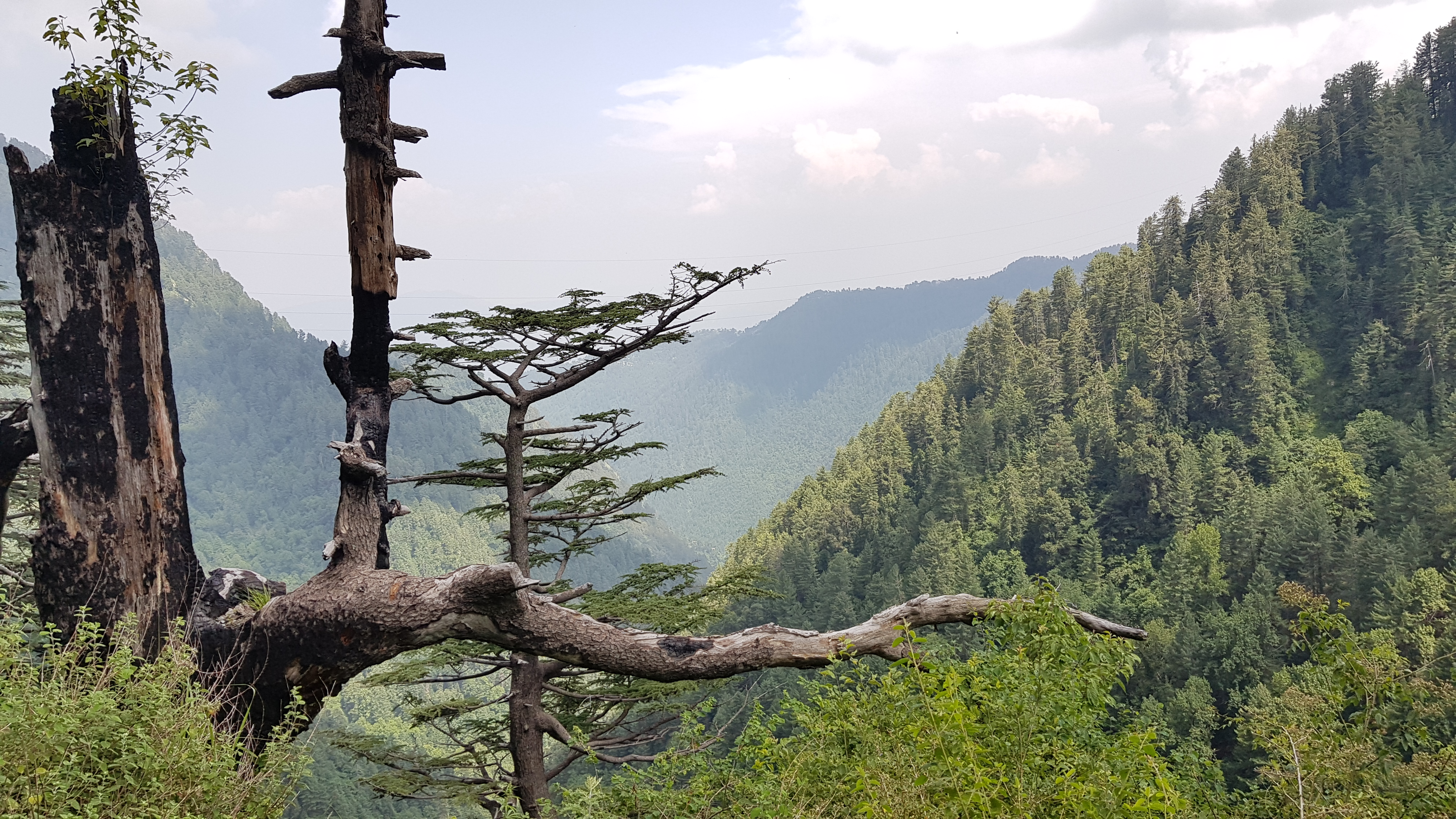
Deodar forests in Ayubia National Park

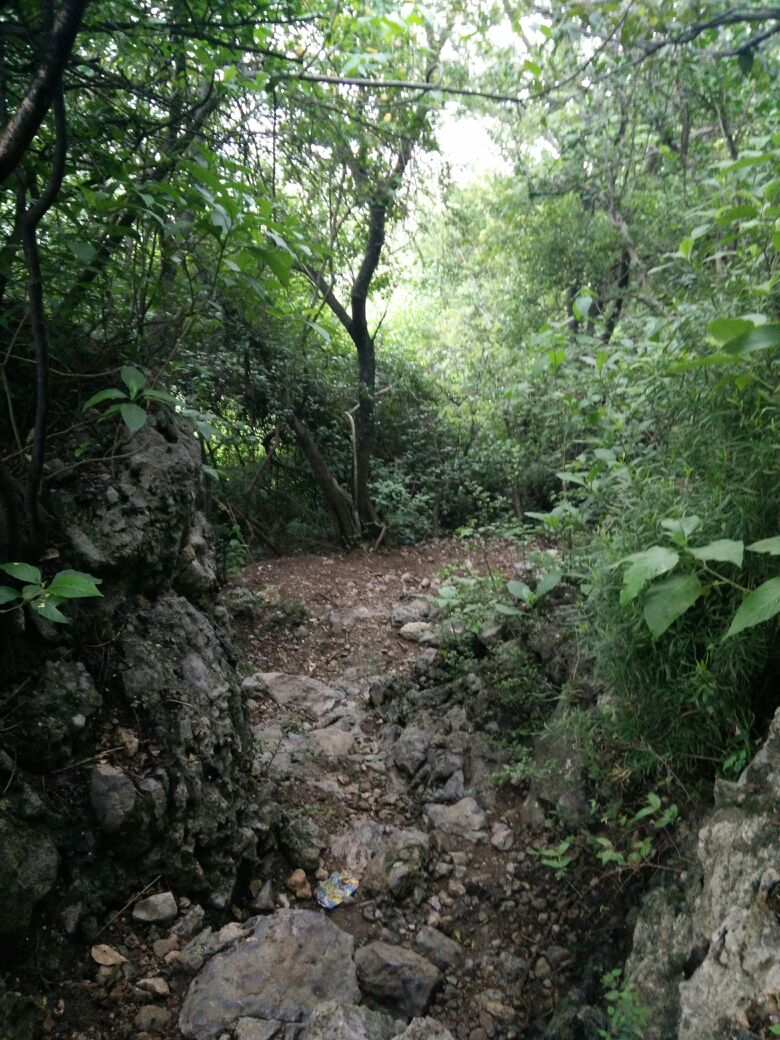
Subtropical moist broadleaf forests vegetation in Margalla Hills.

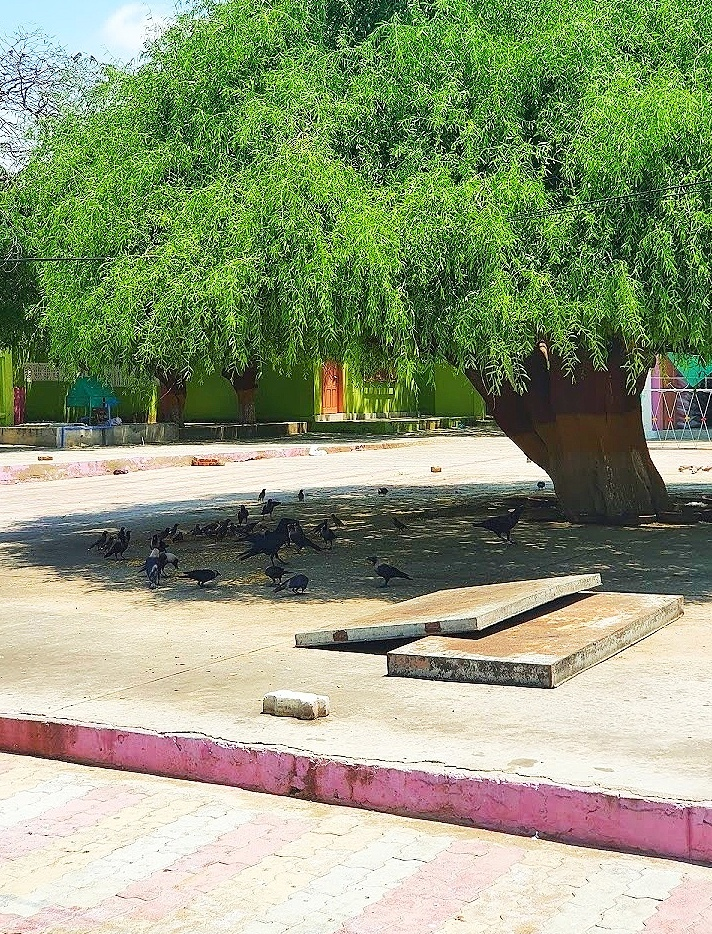
Neem tree at Sant Nenuram Ashram

Pakistan's native flora reflects its varied climatic zones, which range from arid and semi-arid to temperate and tropical.

For further details of habitats, see Ecoregions of Pakistan, Forestry in Pakistan and Wildlife of Pakistan.

== Distribution ==
=== Northern highlands and valleys ===
Pakistan has conifer forests in most of the northern and north-western highlands. These occur from 1,000 to 4,000 m altitudes. Swat, Upper Dir, Lower Dir, Malakand, Mansehra and Abbottabad districts of Khyber Pakhtunkhwa (formerly North-West Frontier Province) are the main areas covered with coniferous forests. Pindrow fir (Abies pindrow) and Morinda spruce (Picea smithiana) occupy the highest altitudes, deodar (Cedrus deodara) and blue pine (Pinus wallichiana), the intermediate heights, and chir pine (Pinus roxburghii), occupy the lower areas. Temperate broadleaf forests are here too consisting of Baloot (Quercus baloot), Bhanj oak (Quercus leucotrichophora), Prunus, Quercus semecarpifolia and other species. Alpine meadows consist of Orchids, Meconopsis, Rose, Delphinium, Gentiana and other flowers scattered in the valleys.

==== Ecoregions ====
- Pamir alpine desert and tundra
- Karakoram–West Tibetan Plateau alpine steppe
- Hindu Kush alpine meadow
- Northwestern Himalayan alpine shrub and meadows
- Western Himalayan subalpine conifer forests
- Western Himalayan broadleaf forests
- Himalayan subtropical pine forests

=== Eastern plains and deserts ===
In most of Punjab and Sindh, the Indus plains have many fluvial landforms that support various natural biomes including tropical and subtropical dry and moist broadleaf forestry as well as tropical and xeric shrublands (deserts of Thal in Punjab, Tharparkar in Sindh) and kair (Capparis aphylla) which provide firewood. The riparian woodlands grow in narrow belts along the banks of the Indus and its tributaries. The main tree species include sheesham (Dalbergia sissoo) and babul (Vachellia nilotica), while the dominant shrubs are reed beds and tamarisk (Tamarix dioica) bushes. The diverse Margalla hills ecoregion has rain-loving plants like sumbal (Bombax ceiba), cluster fig (Ficus racemosa), kamala (Mallotus philippensis) kachnar (Bauhinia variegata), amla (Phyllanthus emblica) and dhak (Butea monosperma). The forests of Bhimber, particularly in Deva Vatala National Park, have trees like mango (Mangifera indica) and neem (Azadirachta indica).

==== Ecoregions ====
- Aravalli West Thorn Scrub Forests
- Margalla Hills subtropical moist forests
- Indus Valley Desert
- Thar Desert

=== Wetlands and coastal regions ===
In the south of Sindh are Indus River Delta in west and Great Rann of Kutch in east. The largest saltwater wetland in Pakistan is the Indus River Delta. Unlike many other river deltas, it consists of clay soil and is very swampy. The Great Rann of Kutch below the Thar Desert is not as swampy and exhibits shrubland vegetation of rather dry thorny shrubs as well as marsh grasses of Apluda and Cenchrus. Other saltwater wetlands are located on the coast of Balochistan such as at Sonmiani and Jiwani. These and Indus River Delta support mangrove forestry, mainly of species Avicennia marina.

==== Ecoregions ====
- Indus River Delta–Arabian Sea mangroves
- Rann of Kutch

=== Western highlands, plains and deserts ===
The western areas of Pakistan in Balochistan and southern Khyber Pakhtunkhwa are relatively dry regions of the Palearctic. There are deodar, Pashtun juniper and chilgoza forests in places like northern Baluchistan and parts of Khyber Pakhtunkhwa like Ziarat, Kurram and Waziristan. Most of the other regions are quite dry consisting of deserts and scrubland. In Baluchistan, palm trees like the nannorrhops and date palm are present, other common trees include prunus brahuica, tamarix, pistacia, vachellia nilotica and others, well adapted to the dry conditions.

==== Ecoregions ====
- Balochistan xeric woodlands
- Kuh Rud and Eastern Iran montane woodlands
- Sulaiman Range alpine meadows
- Central Afghan Mountains xeric woodlands
- Registan–North Pakistan sandy desert
- South Iran Nubo–Sindian desert and semi-desert

== See also ==
- Ecoregions of Pakistan
- Wildlife of Pakistan
- Forestry in Pakistan
- Fauna of Pakistan
- Trees of Pakistan
- Wildflowers of Pakistan
- List of botanical gardens in Pakistan
