= Fauna of Pakistan =

Overview of fauna in Pakistan

Pakistan's native fauna reflect its varied climatic zones. The northern Pakistan, which includes northern Khyber Pakhtunkhwa and Gilgit Baltistan, has portions of two biodiversity hotspots, Mountains of Central Asia and Himalayas.

== Distribution ==
=== Northern highlands and plains ===
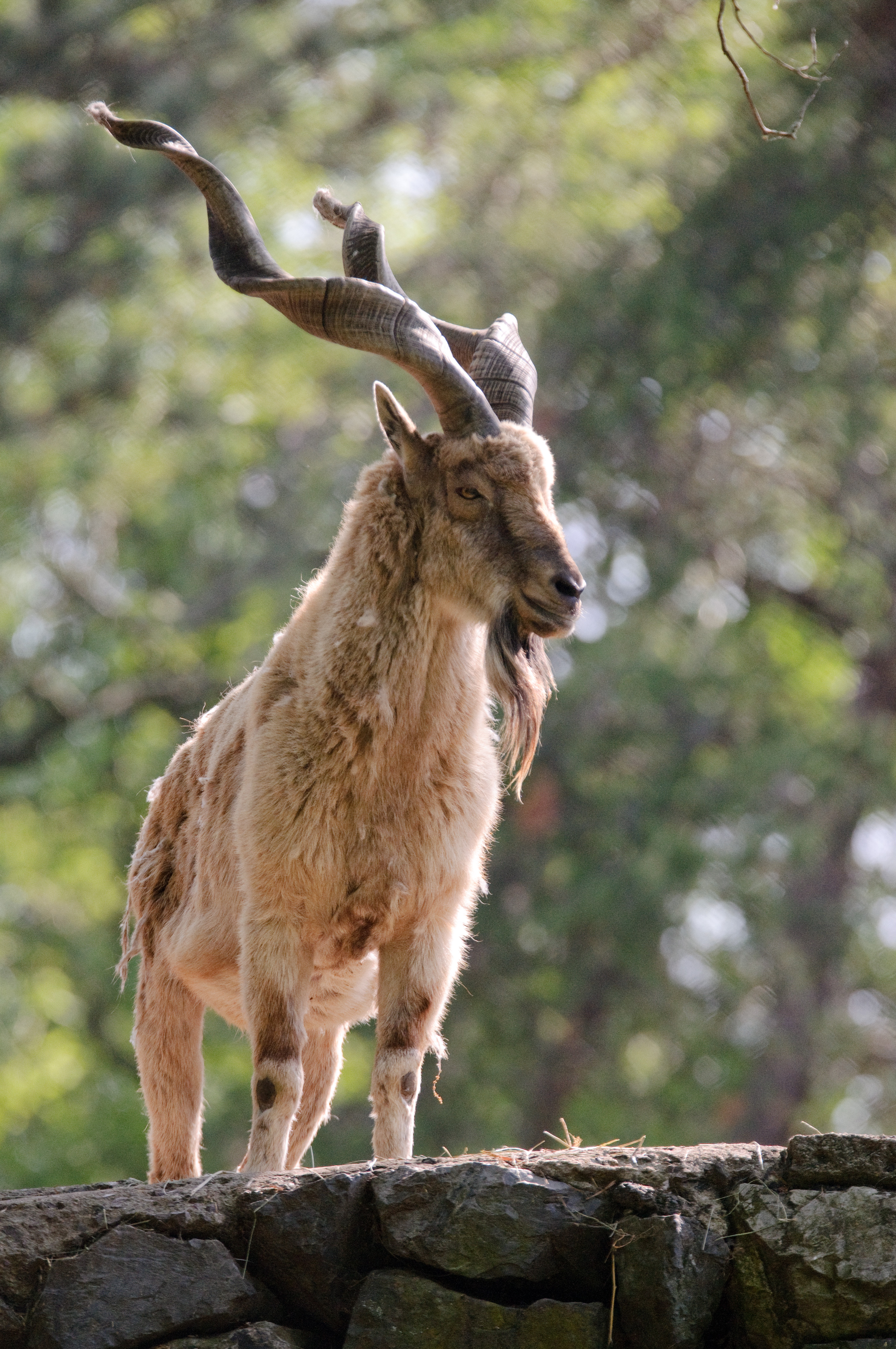
Markhor

The northern highlands include lower elevation areas of Potohar and Pakistan Administered Kashmir regions and higher elevation areas embracing the foothills of Himalayan, Karakorum, Pamir and Hindukush mountain ranges. Some of the wildlife species found on northern mountainous areas and Pothohar Plateau include the non-threatened mammal species of bharal, Eurasian lynx, Himalayan goral, Indian leopard, Marco Polo sheep, Kiang (in Khunjerab), marmot and yellow-throated marten and birds species of chukar partridge, Eurasian eagle-owl, Himalayan monal and Himalayan snowcock and amphibian species of Himalayan toad and Muree Hills frog. The threatened ones include Asiatic black bear, Himalayan brown bear, Indian wolf, Kashmir gray langur, Kashmir red deer (presence uncertain), markhor, rhesus macaque, Siberian ibex, smooth-coated otter and white-bellied musk deer, bird species of cheer pheasant, peregrine falcon, western tragopan and reptile species of mugger crocodile.

=== Indus plains and deserts of Sindh ===
River Indus and its numerous eastern tributaries of Chenab form many fluvial landforms that occupy most of Indus plains in Punjab and western Sindh. Some of the non-threatened mammal species of the Indus plains and the deserts of Sindh include the nilgai, chinkara, red fox and wild boar, bird species of Alexandrine parakeet, barn owl, black kite, myna, hoopoe, Indian peafowl, red-vented bulbul, rock pigeon, shelduck and shikra, reptile species of Indian cobra, Indian star tortoise, Sindh krait and yellow monitor and amphibian species of Indus Valley bullfrog and Indus Valley toad. Some of the threatened mammal species include the sambar deer, Indian hog deer, blackbuck, Punjab urial and Sindh ibex, bird species of white-backed vulture and reptile species of black pond turtle and gharial. Grey partridge is one of the few birds that can be found in the Cholistan desert. The Tharparkar desert supports a fair population of the chinkara. The Asiatic wild ass used to migrate from the Indian part of the Great Rann of Kutch to the part in Pakistan in search of food.

==== Extinct ====
The Asiatic lion used to occur in this region. In 1810, a lion was killed near Kot Diji. Others include the Indian wild ass, Indian elephant, Bengal tiger, Indian rhinoceros, Barasingha and Asiatic cheetah.

=== Western highlands, plains and deserts ===
Western region of Pakistan, most of which is enveloped in Balochistan province, has a complex geography. Some of the mammal species include the caracal, Balochistan leopard, Balochistan forest dormouse, Blanford's fox, goitered gazelle, Indian crested porcupine, long-eared hedgehog, markhor, ratel and striped hyena, bird species of bearded vulture, houbara bustard and merlin, reptile species of leopard gecko and saw-scaled viper and amphibian species of Balochistan toad.

=== Wetlands, coastal regions and marine life ===
Pakistan hosts a number of protected wetlands under the Ramsar Convention. The wetlands are a habitat for migratory birds such as Dalmatian pelicans and demoiselle crane as well as predatory species of osprey, common kingfisher, fishing cat and leopard cat near the coastline. Chashma and Taunsa Barrage Dolphin Sanctuary protects the threatened species of Indus river dolphins which live in freshwater. The coastline of Pakistan is 1,050 km long and consists of a variety of habitat types, supporting a wide range of animals, of which over 1000 are fish species in the reefs of its continental shelf. West coast of Great Rann of Kutch, east to the Indus River Delta and below Tharparkar desert, is one of the few places where greater flamingos come to breed. It is also a habitat for endangered species of lesser florican. The Indus River Delta provide nesting grounds for common snakehead, giant snakehead, Indus baril and many species of catfish like rita. The hilsa swims up from the Arabian Sea to spawn in freshwater. Species that are important to people as food, such as the golden mahseer and large freshwater shrimp (Macrobrachium species), are part of the abundant aquatic life. Along the shores of Astola and Ormara beaches of Balochistan and Hawk'e Bay and Sandspit beaches of Sindh are nesting sites for five endangered species of sea turtles: green sea, loggerhead, hawksbill, olive ridley and leatherback. Sea snakes such as yellow-bellied sea snake are also found in the pelagic zone of the sea. The wetlands of Pakistan are also a home to the endangered species of gharial and mugger crocodile who prefer freshwater habitat.

== Cultural significance ==
Title	Symbol	Picture
National animal	Markhor (Capra falconeri)	
State animal	Snow leopard (Uncia uncia)	
National bird	Chukar partridge (Alectoris chukar)	
State bird	Shaheen falcon or Shaheen (Falco peregrinus peregrinator)	
National aquatic animal	Indus dolphin or Bhulan (Platanista minor)	
National butterfly	Indian purple emperor (Mimathyma ambica)	
National fish	Mahseer (Tor putitora)	
National reptile	Mugger crocodile (Crocodylus palustris)	
National amphibian	Indus Valley toad (Bufo stomaticus)	

== Taxonomic classification ==
- Molluscs of Pakistan
  - Non-marine molluscs
  - Marine molluscs
- Arthropods of Pakistan
  - Ants of Pakistan
  - Odonates of Pakistan
  - Moths of Pakistan
  - Butterflies of Pakistan
  - Spiders of Pakistan
  - Crustaceans of Pakistan
- Chordates of Pakistan
  - Fishes of Pakistan
  - Amphibians of Pakistan
  - Reptiles of Pakistan
  - Birds of Pakistan
  - Mammals of Pakistan

== See also ==
- Ecoregions of Pakistan
- Forestry in Pakistan
- Wildlife of Pakistan
- Flora of Pakistan
