= East Afghan montane conifer forests =

Ecoregion on the Afghanistan-Pakistan border

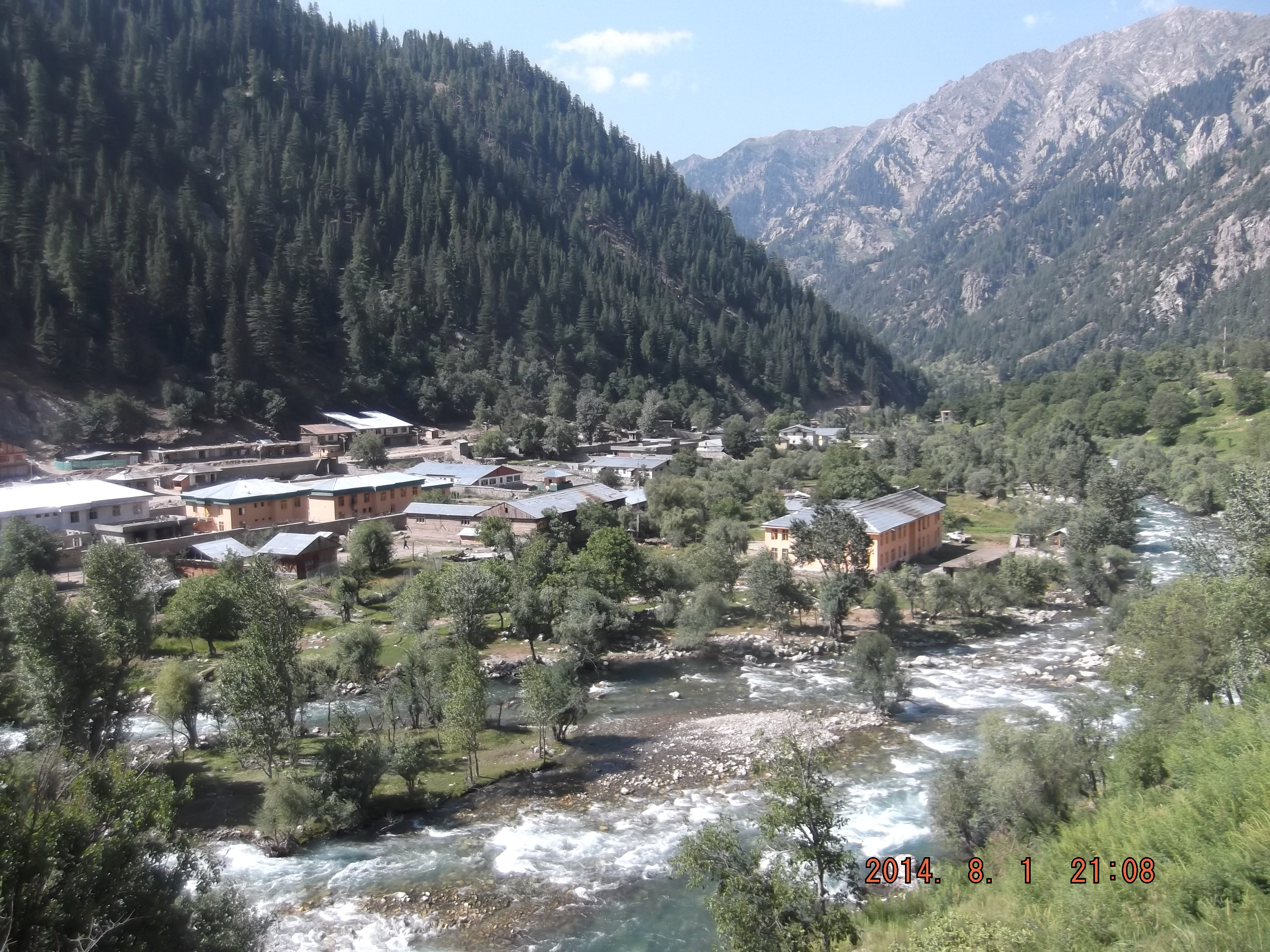
- Town of Parun, Nuristan Province, Afghanistan

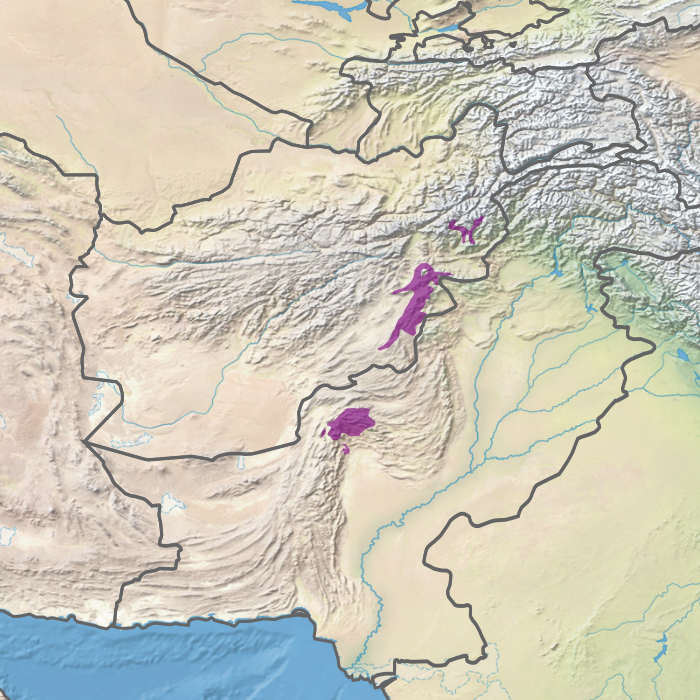
- Ecoregion territory (in purple)

Ecology
- Realm: Palearctic
- Biome: Temperate coniferous forest
- Borders: Baluchistan xeric woodlands; Central Afghan Mountains xeric woodlands; Hindu Kush alpine meadow; Sulaiman Range alpine meadows

Geography
- Area: 20,128 km^{2} (7,771 mi^{2})
- Countries: Afghanistan; Pakistan
- Coordinates: 33.25°N 69.25°E

Conservation
- Protected: 8.98%

The East Afghan montane conifer forests ecoregion (WWF ID: PA0506) covers a series of unconnected conifer forests along the border between Afghanistan and Pakistan, at elevations of 2,000 metres (6,600 ft) to 3,400 metres (11,200 ft) above sea level. The ecoregion supports the near-threatened Markhor (Capra falconeri chiltanensis), known as the Screw-horned goat, the national animal of Pakistan. The forests of the ecoregion have been heavily thinned for timber.

== Location and description ==
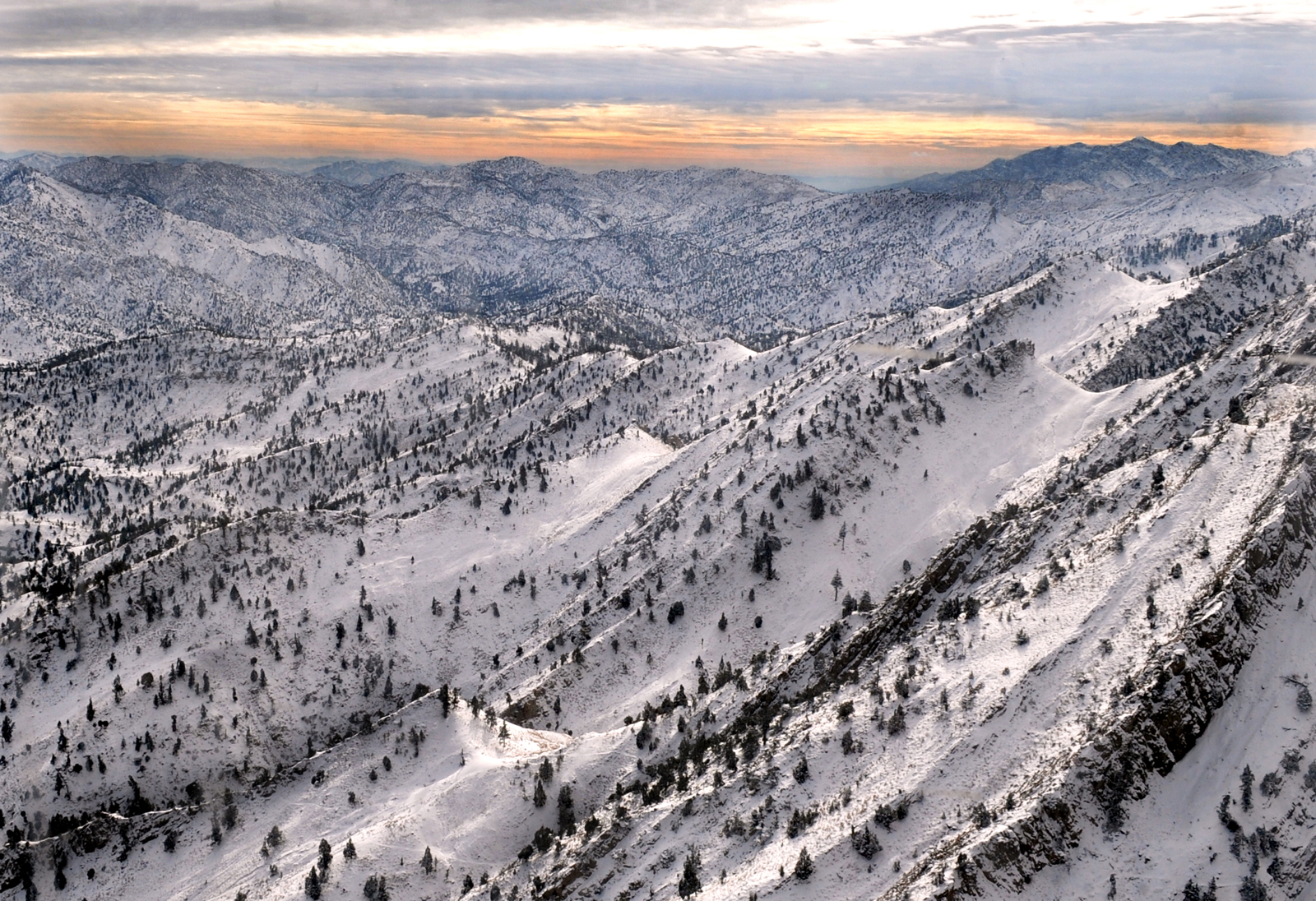
Sunset over mountains of this region during winter in Paktia Province

The northernmost sector is the smallest, lying on the southern edge of the Hindu Kush mountains, in Nuristan Province about 60 km north of Jalalabad. This subregion is bounded on the north and south by the Hindu Kush alpine meadow ecoregion, and on the west and east by the drier Baluchistan xeric woodlands. The middle sector is centered in Paktia Province, south of Kabul. It covers the mountains east of the Gardez valley. The southern sector of the ecological range is in the mountains above Quetta and Kuchlak in Pakistan.

The soil in the northern area is gravel and organic matter over a clay substrate. In the south, the bedrock is limestone.

== Climate ==
The climate of the ecoregion is Humid continental climate, warm summer (Köppen climate classification (Dfb)). This climate is characterized by large seasonal temperature differentials and a warm summer (at least four months averaging over 10 °C (50 °F), but no month averaging over 22 °C (72 °F). Average precipitation in the ecoregion is 200-400 mm/year.

== Flora and fauna ==
Only about 40% of the ecoregion is covered in vegetation, generally shrubs, herbaceous cover, and open forest. The forest type is mostly determined by altitude zones. From 2,100-2,500 meters elevation the forest is drier, with Chilgoza pine (Pinus gerardiana), holly oak (Quercus baloot), species of the beech family (Fagaceae), and cedar (Cedrus). Understory at this stage features Indigofera gerardiana (a legume) and Danewort (Sambucus ebulus).

From 2,500-3,100 meters, the rains from the monsoon are picked up and more deciduous trees are found among the conifers. This forest may become dense, and includes Morinda spruce (Picea smithiana), Bhutan pine (Pinus wallichiana), Quercus semecarpifolia, and Himalayan cedar (Cedrus deodara). Above 3,100 meters the forest transitions to more juniper (Juniperus seravschanica).

The lakes of the northern sectors support a wide variety of migratory and breeding birds, including various species of rails (pochards, coots), marsh hens, black-necked grebe, and others.

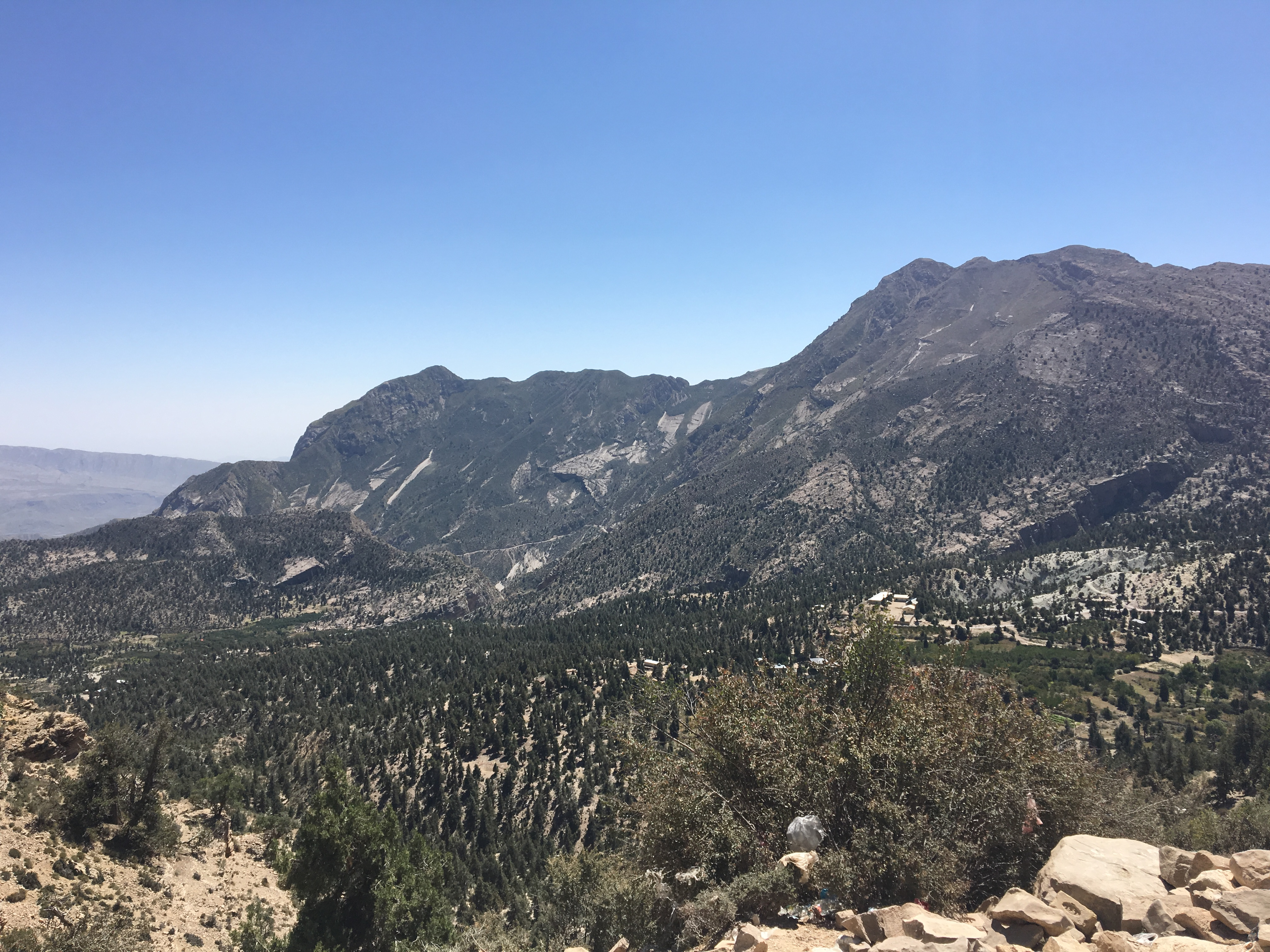
Ziarat Valley, Balochistan, Pakistan, in southern sector

== Protected areas ==
About 9% of the ecoregion is officially protected. These protected areas include:

- Hazarganji-Chiltan National Park
- Ziarat Juniper Forest
- Sasnamana Wildlife Sanctuary
- Zawarkhan Game Reserve
- Gogi Game Reserve
- Wam Game Reserve
- Nuristan National Park

The park in Nuristan Province, the northernmost sector of the ecoregion, was declared a National Park of Afghanistan in July 2020. At the time, plans for facilities and support for tourism had not yet been announced.

== See also ==
- Environmental issues in Afghanistan
