= List of ecoregions in Pakistan =

Pakistan has a wide variety of landscapes, having Riparian forest along the Indus, dry mountain ranges along the border with Afghanistan (like Safed Koh and Hindu Kush) and the Thar Desert shared with India. Much of the land is dry but there are humid areas especially along the lower Himalayas. This also gives Pakistan a high variety of ecoregions, both Palearctic and Indomalayan. Pakistan encompasses two Biodiversity hotspots: the Mountains of Central Asia and Himalayas.

This is a list of ecoregions of Pakistan.

Picture	Realm	Biome	Ecoregion	Region
Margalla hills National park	Indomalayan	Tropical and subtropical moist broadleaf forest	Margalla hills	Siwalik hills, West Himalaya (Islamabad Capital Territory)
Patriata, Murree	Indomalayan	Tropical and subtropical coniferous forests	Himalayan subtropical pine forests	West Himalaya (Azad Kashmir, north Punjab, north Khyber Pakhtunkhwa)
Ayubia National Park	Indomalayan	Temperate broadleaf and mixed forests	Western Himalayan broadleaf forests	West Himalaya (Azad Kashmir, north Punjab, north Khyber Pakhtunkhwa)
Kumrat Valley	Indomalayan	Temperate coniferous forests	Western Himalayan subalpine conifer forests	West Himalaya (Azad Kashmir, north Punjab, south Gilgit-Baltistan, north Khyber Pakhtunkhwa)
Lal Suhanra National Park	Indomalayan	Deserts and xeric shrublands	Aravalli West Thorn Scrub Forests	Along the Indus throughout central Punjab, Sindh and eastern Balochistan
Noorpur Thal	Indomalayan	Deserts and xeric shrublands	Indus Valley desert	Punjab (between Chenab and Indus rivers)
Cholistan Desert	Indomalayan	Deserts and xeric shrublands	Thar Desert	East Sindh and south-east Punjab
Rann of Kutch from above	Indomalayan	Flooded grasslands and savannas	Rann of Kutch seasonal salt marsh	East of coastal range of Sindh
Mangroves in Keti Bandar	Indomalayan	Mangrove	Indus River Delta-Arabian Sea mangroves	Coastal range of Sindh
Ziarat Juniper Forest	Palearctic	Temperate coniferous forests	East Afghan montane conifer forests	Hindu Kush and Sulaiman ranges (north Balochistan, FATA, west Punjab and south Khyber Pakhtunkhwa)
Khunjerab Pass	Palearctic	Montane grasslands and shrublands	Pamir alpine desert and tundra	Northern tip of Hunza District. (north Gilgit-Baltistan)
Deosai National Park	Palearctic	Montane grasslands and shrublands	Karakoram-West Tibetan Plateau alpine steppe	Karakoram, Pamir and North Himalaya (Gilgit–Baltistan)
Shounter, Neelum	Palearctic	Montane grasslands and shrublands	Northwestern Himalayan alpine shrub and meadows	West Himalaya (Azad Kashmir, north Punjab, south Gilgit-Baltistan, north Khyber Pakhtunkhwa)
Ovir Arkari, Chitral	Palearctic	Montane grasslands and shrublands	Hindu Kush alpine meadow	Along the border with Afghanistan in Chitral District.
Parachinar, Kurram	Palearctic	Montane grasslands and shrublands	Sulaiman Range alpine meadows	Parts of Northwestern Balochistan and West Khyber Pakhtunkhwa.
	Palearctic	Montane grasslands and shrublands	Kuh Rud and Eastern Iran montane woodlands	West Balochistan
Sheikh Badin	Palearctic	Deserts and xeric shrublands	Baluchistan xeric woodlands	Xeric areas of Balochistan, Khyber Pakhtunkhwa and north-western Punjab
Nushki	Palearctic	Deserts and xeric shrublands	Registan-North Pakistan sandy desert	Sandy deserts of north-west Balochistan
Makran Coastal Highway	Palearctic	Deserts and xeric shrublands	South Iran Nubo–Sindian desert and semi-desert	Southwest Balochistan
	Palearctic	Deserts and xeric shrublands	Central Afghan Mountains xeric woodlands	Northern Musakhel District and surrounding areas (Far North-West Balochistan)
