= Wildlife of Pakistan =

The wildlife of Pakistan comprises a diverse flora and fauna across a wide range of habitats, from sea level to high-elevation areas in the mountains, including 195 mammal species, 668 bird species, and more than 5,000 species of invertebrates. This diverse composition of the country's fauna is associated with its location in the transitional zone between two major biogeographic realms: the Palearctic and the Indomalayan realm. The northern regions of Pakistan, which include Khyber Pakhtunkhwa, Azad Kashmir, North Punjab and Gilgit-Baltistan, encompass portions of two biodiversity hotspots: the Mountains of Central Asia and the Himalayas.

== Habitats ==
=== Northern highlands and plains ===
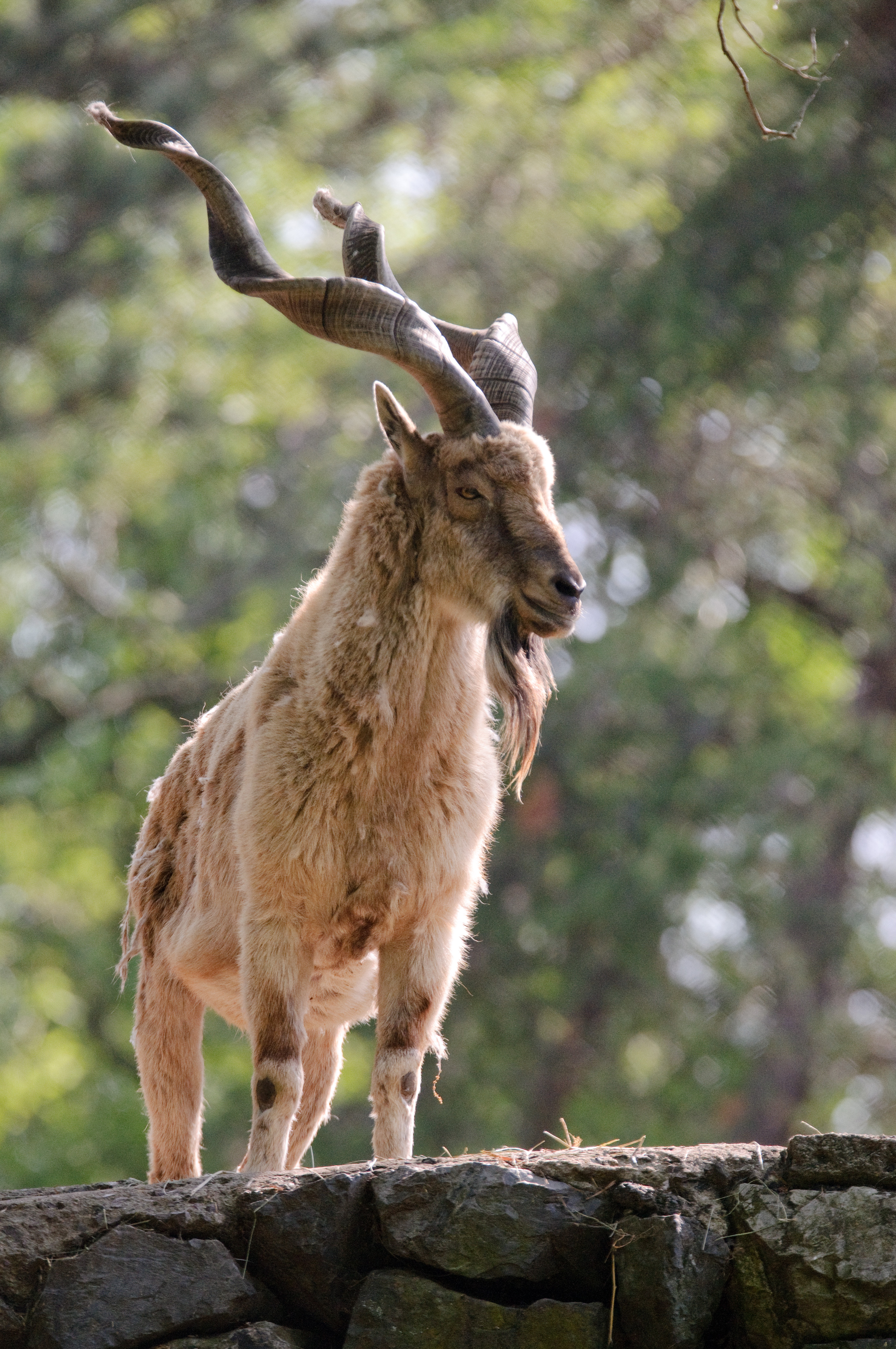
Markhor is the national animal of Pakistan

The northern highlands include lower elevation areas of Potohar and Pakistan administered Jammu and Kashmir regions and higher elevation areas embracing the foothills of Himalayan, Karakorum, Pamir and Hindu Kush mountain ranges. These areas provide an excellent habitat for wildlife in the form of alpine grazing lands, sub-alpine scrub and temperate forests.

Some of the wildlife species found in northern mountainous areas and Pothohar Plateau include the bharal, Eurasian lynx, Himalayan goral, Marco Polo sheep, kiang, marmot and yellow-throated marten and birds species of chukar partridge, Eurasian eagle-owl, Himalayan monal and Himalayan snowcock and amphibian species of Himalayan toad and Muree Hills frog.

Threatened species include the snow leopard, Himalayan brown bear, Indian wolf, rhesus macaque, markhor, Siberian ibex and white-bellied musk deer. Bird species present are cheer pheasant, peregrine falcon, Himalayan monal and western tragopan.

=== Indus plains and deserts of Sindh ===
The Indus River and its numerous eastern tributaries of Chenab, Ravi, Sutlej, Jhelum, Beas are spread across most of Punjab. The plain of the Indus continues towards and occupies most of western Sindh. The plains have many fluvial landforms (including bars, flood plains, levees, meanders and oxbows) that support various natural biomes including tropical and subtropical dry and moist broadleaf forestry as well as tropical and xeric shrublands (deserts of Thal and Cholistan in Punjab, Nara and Thar in Sindh). The banks and stream beds of the river system also support riparian woodlands that exhibit the tree species of kikar, mulberry and sheesham. Such geographical landforms accompanied by an excellent system of monsoon climate provides an excellent ground for diversity of flora and fauna species. However, the plains are equally appealing to humans for agricultural goals and development of civilization.

Some of the non-threatened mammal species includes the nilgai, chinkara,red fox, golden jackal and wild boar, bird species of Alexandrine parakeet, barn owl, black kite, myna, hoopoe, Indian peafowl, Indian leopard, red-vented bulbul, rock pigeon, shelduck and shikra, reptile species of Indian cobra, Indian star tortoise, Sindh krait and yellow monitor and amphibian species of Indus Valley bullfrog and Indus Valley toad. Some of the threatened mammal species include the sambar deer, blackbuck (in captivity; extinct in wild), Indian hog deer, northern red muntjac, Indian pangolin, Punjab urial and Sindh ibex, bird species of white-backed vulture and reptile species of black pond turtle and gharial. Grey partridge is one of the few birds that can be found in the Cholistan desert.

Mugger crocodiles inhabit the Deh Akro-II Desert Wetland Complex, Nara Desert Wildlife Sanctuary, Chotiari Reservoir and Haleji Lake.

=== Western highlands, plains and deserts ===
The western region of Pakistan, most of which is enveloped in Balochistan province, has a complex geography. In mountainous highlands, habitat varies from conifer forests of deodar in Waziristan and juniper in Ziarat. Numerous mountain ranges surround the huge lowland plains of Balochistani Plateau, through which a rather intricate meshwork of seasonal rivers and salt pans is spread. Deserts are also present, showing xeric shrubland vegetation in the region. Date palms and ephedra are common flora varieties in the desert.

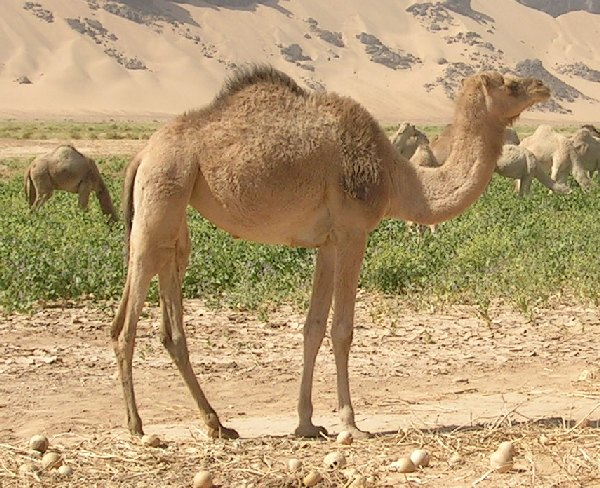
The dromedary Camel

The Balochistan leopard has been described from this region. Some of the mammal species include the caracal, Balochistan dormouse, Blanford's fox, dromedary camel, goitered gazelle, Indian crested porcupine, long-eared hedgehog, markhor, ratel, and striped hyena, bird species of bearded vulture, houbara bustard and merlin, reptile species of leopard gecko and saw-scaled viper and amphibian species of Balochistan toad. The Pallas's cat lives in the rocky slopes.

=== Wetlands, coastal regions and marine life ===
There are a number of protected wetlands (under Ramsar Convention) in Pakistan. These include Tanda Dam and Thanedar Wala in Khyber Pakhtunkhwa, Chashma Barrage, Taunsa Barrage and Uchhali Complex in Punjab, Haleji Lake, Hub Dam and Kinjhar Lake in Sindh, Miani Hor in Balochistan. The wetlands are a habitat for migratory birds such as Dalmatian pelicans and demoiselle crane as well as predatory species of osprey, common kingfisher, fishing cat and leopard cat near the coast line. Chashma and Taunsa Barrage Dolphin Sanctuary protects the threatened Indus river dolphins which live in freshwater.

The east half of the coast of Pakistan is located in the south of Sindh province, which features the Indus River Delta and the coast of the Great Rann of Kutch. The largest saltwater wetland in Pakistan is the Indus River Delta. Unlike many other river deltas, it consists of clay soil and is very swampy. The west coast of the Great Rann of Kutch, east to the Indus River Delta and below the Tharparkar desert, is one of the few places where greater flamingos come to breed. It is also a habitat for endangered species of lesser florican. Unlike the Indus River Delta, this part of the coast is not as swampy and exhibits shrubland vegetation of rather dry thorny shrubs as well as marsh grasses of Apluda and Cenchrus.

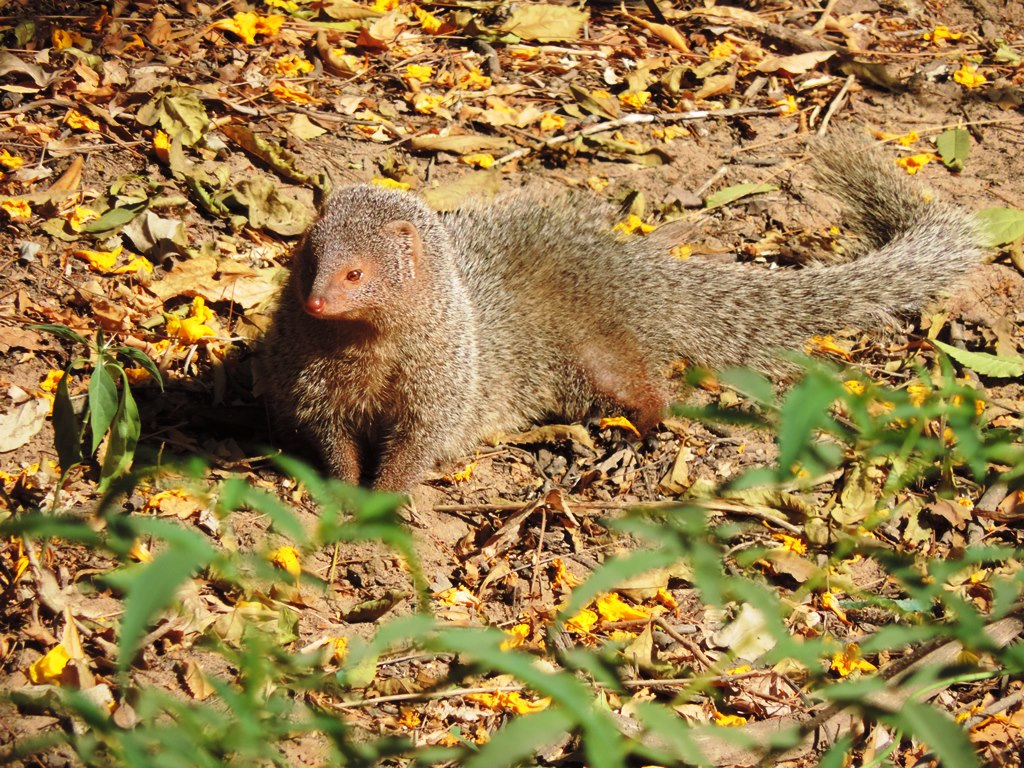
Indian grey mongoose

The vegetation of the Indus River Delta is mainly represented by various mangrove species and bamboo species. The Indus River Delta-Arabian Sea mangroves is a focused ecoregion of WWF. Nearly 95% of the mangroves located in the Indus River Delta are of the species Avicennia marina. Very small patches of Ceriops roxburghiana and Aegiceras corniculatum are found. These provide nesting grounds for common snakehead, giant snakehead, Indus baril and many species of catfish like rita. The hilsa swims up from the Arabian Sea to spawn in freshwater. Species that are important to people as food, such as the golden mahseer and large freshwater shrimp (Macrobrachium species), are part of the abundant aquatic life.

The west half of the Pakistan coast is in the south of Balochistan province. It is also called the Makran coast and exhibits protected sites such as Astola Island and Hingol National Park. The three major mangrove plantations of Balochistan coast are Miani Hor, Kalmat Khor and Gwatar Bay. Miani Hor is a swampy lagoon on the coast in the Lasbela district where the climate is very arid. The sources of fresh water for Miani Hor are the seasonal river of Porali. The nearest river to the other lagoon, Kalmat Khor, is the Basol River. Gawatar, the third site, is an open bay with a mouth almost as wide as its length. Its freshwater source is the Dasht River, the largest seasonal river of Baluchistan. All three bays support mainly A. marina species of mangrove. Pakistan also plans to rehabilitate mangrove-degraded areas at Sonmiani and Jiwani in Balochistan.

Along the shores of Astola and Ormara beaches of Balochistan and Hawke's Bay and Sandspit beaches of Sindh are nesting sites for five endangered species of sea turtles: green sea, loggerhead, hawksbill, olive ridley and leatherback. Sea snakes such as yellow-bellied sea snake are also found in the pelagic zone of the sea. The wetlands of Pakistan are also a home to the mugger crocodile who prefer freshwater habitat.

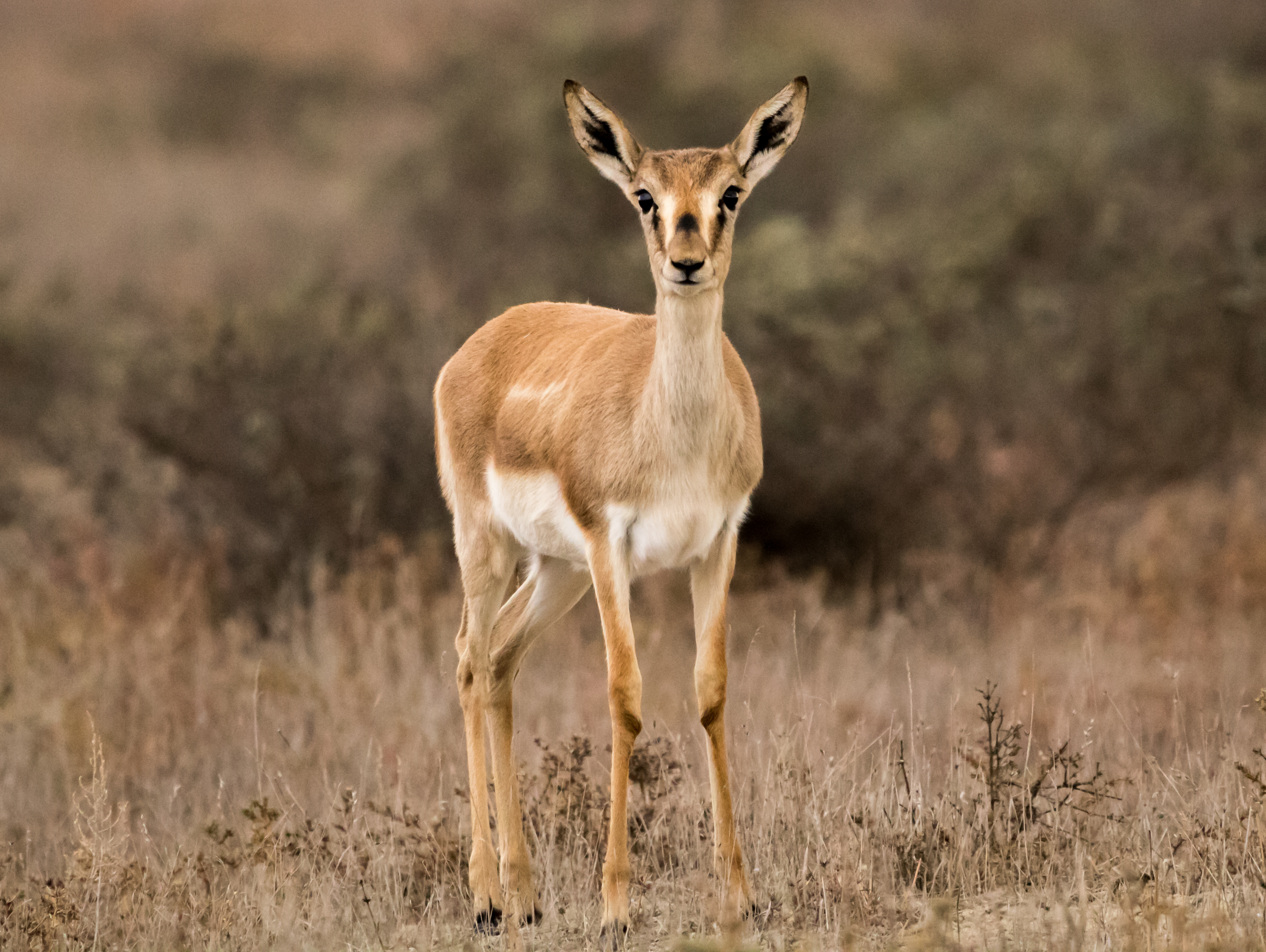
Goitered gazelle

== Extinct ==
Regionally extinct species in Pakistan include:

- Indian rhinoceros (since the 17th century)
- Asian elephant
- Asiatic lion
- Asiatic cheetah
- Bengal tiger
- Barasingha
- Indian wild ass
- Kashmir stag (possibly extinct).

== Regional departments ==
- Balochistan Forests & Wildlife Department
- Climate Change, Forestry, Environment & Wildlife Department, Khyber Pakhtunkhwa
- Forest, Wildlife & Environment Department, Gilgit-Baltistan
- Forestry, Wildlife and Fisheries department, Punjab
- Sindh Wildlife Department

== See also ==
- List of mammals of Pakistan
- List of reptiles of South Asia
- Wildflowers of Pakistan
- Invertebrates of Pakistan
  - Non-marine molluscs of Pakistan
  - Butterflies of Pakistan
  - Spiders of Pakistan
- Vertebrates of Pakistan
  - Fishes of Pakistan
  - Amphibians of Pakistan
  - Reptiles of Pakistan
  - Birds of Pakistan (Birds of Islamabad)
  - Mammals of Pakistan
