= Ministry of Environment (Pakistan) =

Defunct Ministry of the Government of Pakistan

The Ministry of Environment (MoE) was a federal ministry of the Government of Pakistan that was primarily responsible for the planning, coordination, promotion, protection and oversight of policy implementation of government-sanctioned environmental and forestry programmes in the country. Its activities included conservation, survey of fauna, flora, forestry, wildlife (including Wildflowers); environment protection, prevention of pollution, afforestation, and land degradation mitigation. The MoE was also responsible for establishing and administering the National Parks of Pakistan.

The ministerial department or MoE was administrated by the Environment Minister of Pakistan who was a member of the cabinet of the Prime Minister of Pakistan.

The MoE had also contained the separate and autonomous government department— Pakistan Environmental Protection Agency (Pakistan EPA). The EPA is a leading department of the MoE, usually tasked to handle the air pollution, radioactive waste management, promotion of civilian usage of environmental isotopes, while it also has the responsible to implementing and enforcing the Pakistan Environmental Protection Act in the country.

Pakistan Environmental Protection Agency was an attached department of the Ministry of Environment and responsible to implement the Pakistan Environmental Protection Act, 1997 in the country. An Act to provide for the protection, conservation, rehabilitation and improvement of environment, for the prevention and control of pollution, and promotion of sustainable development. Pakistan Environmental Protection Agency also provides all kind of technical assistance to the Ministry of Environment for formulation of environment policy and programmes.

== Former departments ==
- Environmental Protection Agency for Azad Kashmir
- EPA for Punjab Province
- EPA for Sindh Province
- EPA for Khyber-Pakhtunkhwa Province
- EPA for Balochistan Province
- EPA for Gilgit-Baltistan

== See also ==
- Pakistan Environmental Protection Agency
