= Ziarat Valley =

Valley in Pakistan

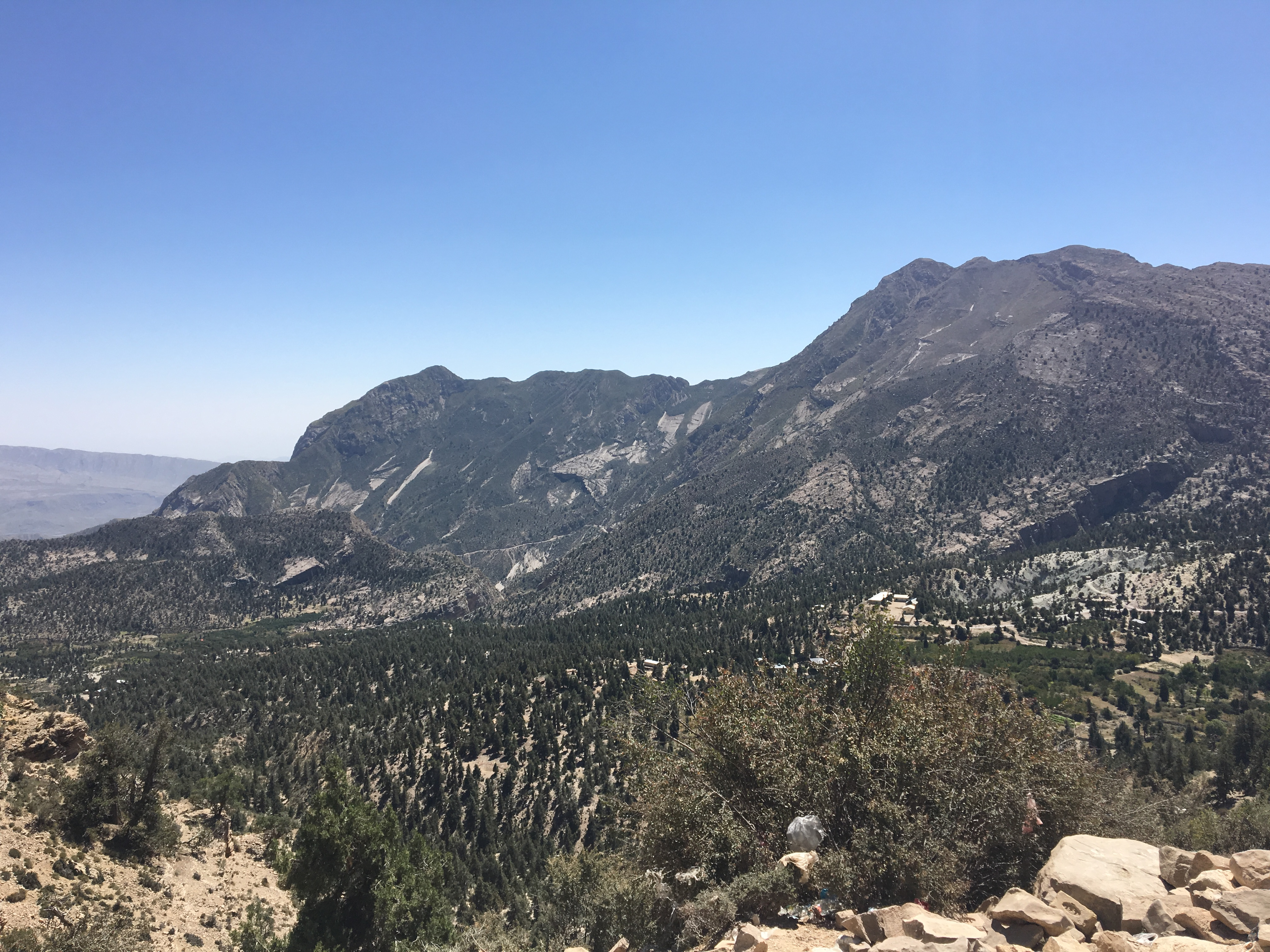
Ziarat Valley

The Ziarat Valley (Urdu: وا دى زىارت; Balochi: وادی زیارت; Pashto: د زیارت دره; Dari: دره زیارت) is a valley in Ziarat District, in Balochistan province, Pakistan. The area of the Ziarat village is about 10 km^{2}. A large forest of juniper trees, part of the East Afghan montane conifer forests, covers much of the valley, although it is threatened due to overuse and climate change.
