= Juniperus seravschanica =

Scientific classification
- Kingdom: Plantae
- Clade: Tracheophytes
- Clade: Gymnospermae
- Division: Pinophyta
- Class: Pinopsida
- Order: Cupressales
- Family: Cupressaceae
- Genus: Juniperus
- Section: Juniperus sect. Sabina
- Species: J. seravschanica

Binomial name
- Juniperus seravschanica Kom.
- Distribution of Juniperus excelsa complex

Synonyms
- Juniperus polycarpos var. seravschanica (Kom.) Kitam.; Juniperus macropoda Boiss.

Species of conifer

Juniperus seravschanica is a species of juniper. Common names include Pashtun juniper (Pashto: اوبښته ōbəx̌ta, "[a species] which sucks water"; Pashto: پښتني صنوبر).

It ranges from southernmost Kazakhstan through Kyrgyzstan, Tajikistan, eastern Uzbekistan and Turkmenistan, to northern and eastern Afghanistan, northern Pakistan, and Kashmir. Outlying populations are found in the mountains of southeastern Iran – near Kuhbanan, Rabor, and on Kuh-e Khabr in the Hazaran range – and the Hajar Mountains of Oman.

Juniperus seravschanica is sometimes classified as a subspecies of J. polycarpos or J. excelsa.

== Distribution ==
Juniperus seravschanica occurs in the higher-elevation forests in Kazakhstan, Kyrgyzstan, Tajikistan and Uzbekistan, which the World Wildlife Fund calls the Gissaro-Alai open woodlands. In this general region Juniperus turkestanica, J. semiglobosa, maples (Acer spp.), almonds (Prunus amygdalus), and roses (Rosa spp.) also occur (although not necessarily in the same habitats). In eastern Afghanistan it also occurs in upper-montane woodlands of J. seravschanica which occur at elevations between 3,100 and 3,300 metres (10,200 and 10,800 feet), in the territory the WWF has delineated as East Afghan montane conifer forests, and in the open xeric woodlands at elevations of 1,500–2,000 m (4,900–6,600 ft), further south in the Baluchistan xeric woodlands of southern Afghanistan and Pakistan's Balochistan Province.

A substantial but dwindling forest of J. seravschanica is found in Ziarat District and Kalat District of Pakistan, as well as Zarghun Ghar Zarghoon Mountains near Quetta and Harboi including some are found in Koh-i-Takatu and Koh-i-Murdaar adjacent to Quetta in northern and central Balochistan, and surrounding parts of southeastern Afghanistan. The largest compact block is the Ziarat Juniper Forest in Ziarat and surroundings on an approximate range of about 700,000 acres (2,800 square kilometres).

The southernmost population of J. seravschanica is in the Hajar Mountains of Oman, where the junipers grow in the highest portions of the central range. The junipers form open woodlands at elevations of 2,100–3,000 m (6,900–9,800 ft), sometimes co-dominant with Olea europaea.

== Conservation ==
Overgrazing by camels, goats and feral donkeys has impeded regeneration of woodlands at altitudes below 2,400 m in Oman.
