= Nara Desert Wildlife Sanctuary =

Sanctuary in Sindh, Pakistan

- پناهگاه حیات وحش صحرای نارا
- Location: Mirpur Khas District, Sindh, Pakistan
- Area: 6,300 km^{2} (2,400 sq mi)

Nara Desert Wildlife Sanctuary is located in Mirpurkhas District, Sindh, Pakistan.

The Nara desert provides refuge to much wildlife in the Sindh province. The Nara Canal area, a chain of some 200 freshwater, brackish and saline lakes and marshes stretching for about 150 km along either side of the Nara Canal from Sorah in the north to Sanghar in the south, is known to be of great importance for wintering waterfowl and other wildlife.

The largest population of the endangered Mugger crocodile in Pakistan is found here.

== Biodiversity ==
There are mammals such as the Indian long-eared hedgehog, caracal, Indian desert cat, Indian grey mongoose, common jackal, Indian jackal, striped hyena, bengal fox, honey badger, Indian pangolin, chinkara, Central Asian boar, Indian hare, Northern palm squirrel, Indian crested porcupine and Indian desert jird.
