= Harboi =

Mountain range in Balochistan, Pakistan

Coordinates: 29°3′0″N 66°44′00″E

Harboi (Balochi and Brahvi: ہڑبوئ) is a mountain range located in the Kalat District of Balochistan, Pakistan. It is located at 29°3'0N 66°43'0 E and is 9,000 feet high, and unlike most of the mountains in the area, which are black and barren, the Harboi contains juniper trees and picturesque scenery. The local people living in these areas are not provided with the basic necessities of life. So, they exploit the forest resources for fuel, shelter and uses as firewood for daily use; timber for construction of hutment and hedges around agricultural fields by the local communities is resulting in change in the environment and endangering the rare species of wildlife.
