= Balochistan xeric woodlands =

Ecoregion in Pakistan and Afghanistan

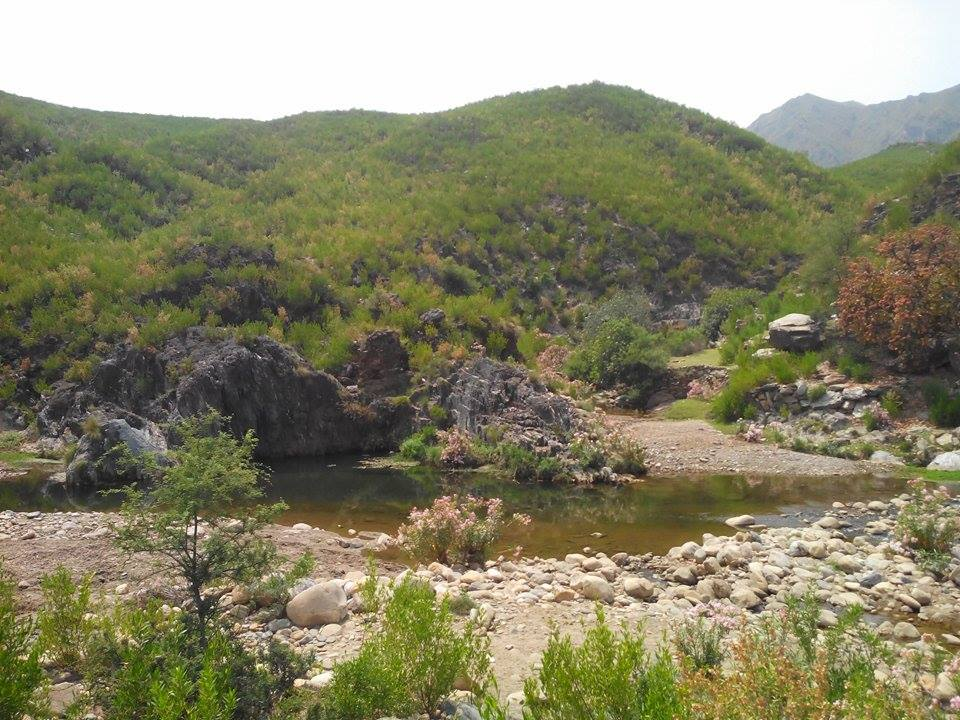
- Near Charsadda, Pakistan

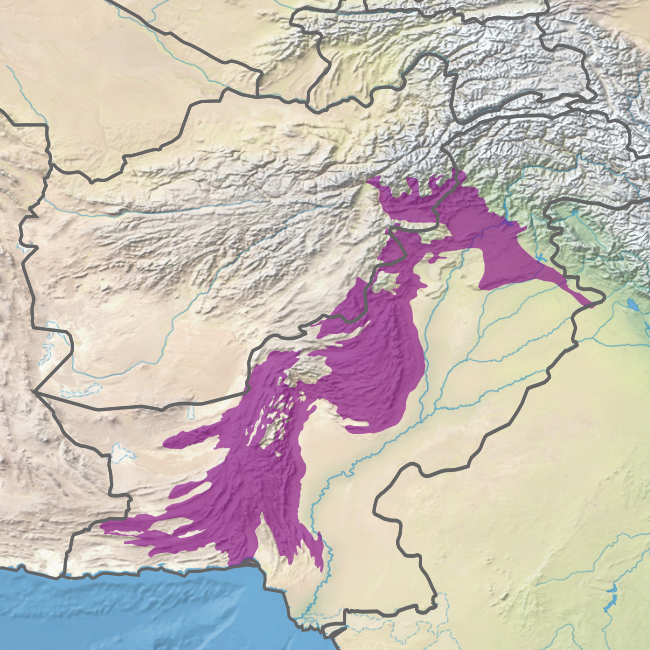
- Ecoregion territory (in purple)

Ecology
- Realm: Palearctic
- Biome: Deserts and xeric shrublands
- Borders: List: Central Afghan Mountains xeric woodlands; East Afghan montane conifer forests; Himalayan subtropical pine forests; Northwestern thorn scrub forests; Registan–North Pakistan sandy desert; South Iran Nubo-Sindian desert and semi-desert; Sulaiman Range alpine meadows; Western Himalayan subalpine conifer forests; Margalla hills

Geography
- Area: 289,391 km^{2} (111,734 mi^{2})
- Countries: Pakistan; Afghanistan; India; Iran
- Coordinates: 32.75°N 70.25°E

Conservation
- Protected: 3.3%

The Balochistan xeric woodlands ecoregion (WWF ID: PA1307) covers the middle elevations of a series of mountain ranges of western Pakistan and northeastern Afghanistan, reaching 1,200 kilometres (750 mi) from the Arabian Sea in the south to the Hindu Kush Mountains and the Himalayas in the north. The characteristic vegetation is xeric (dry) woodlands of shrubs and herbaceous cover. The region has rich biodiversity but relatively few endemic species.

== Location and description ==
In the south, the ecoregion rises from the coastal ranges into the Makran Range and Kirthar Mountains. It proceeds north through the arid desert of Pakistan's Balochistan Province along the western border of Pakistan, including the Zarghun Ghar Range, Sulaiman Range and Spīn Ghar Mountains into Khyber Pakhtunkhwa Province. Eventually it reaches the base of the Hindu Kush and Himalayas. These mountain ranges are periodically cut by passes and valleys, including the Bolan Pass near Quetta and the Khyber Pass above the Valley of Peshawar. Elevations range from sea level to a high of 4,575 metres (15,010 ft).

Along the south-western side of the ecoregion are the very dry South Iran Nubo-Sindian desert and semi-desert and Registan–North Pakistan sandy desert ecoregions of eastern Iran. Further north in Afghanistan is the Central Afghan Mountains xeric woodlands ecoregion (xeric being 'dry'). Along the east side is the Northwestern thorn scrub forests. In the middle of the ecoregion, along the tops of the highest ridges are isolated patches of two wetter ecoregions – the East Afghan montane conifer forests and Sulaiman Range alpine meadows.

The soils contain gypsum and are classified as pedocals (high in calcium carbonate and low in organic matter). In the north of the region the soils on the ridges are limestone, clay, gravel and stone.

== Climate ==
The climate of the ecoregion is Hot semi-arid (Köppen climate classification (BSh)). This climate is characteristic of steppes, with hot summers and cool or mild winters, and minimal precipitation. The coldest month averages above 0 °C (32 °F). Precipitation averages 150 mm/year. Hot winds from the north occur in summer, raising dust storms in the south with velocities up to 110 mph.

== Flora and fauna ==
67% of the territory is bare or sparse vegetation. 9% is shrubland, 8% is herbaceous vegetation, and 9% is cultivated cropland. Below 1,500 meters, the vegetation is steppe in character. From 1,500 to 2,000 meters is found montane open forest of pistachio trees (Pistacia atlantica), wild almond (Prunus), and barberry (Berberis). Lower brush includes honeysuckle bush (Lonicera), sagebrush (Artemisia spp.), and Pashtun juniper (Juniperus seravschanica). In the lower regions are stands of Persian mesquite (Prosopis cineraria), Shisham (Dalbergia sissoo), Babul (Vachellia nilotica) At higher altitudes there is a transitional zone of sclerophyll trees (woody brush with hard leaves). At still higher elevations are the isolated alpine meadows of other ecoregions.

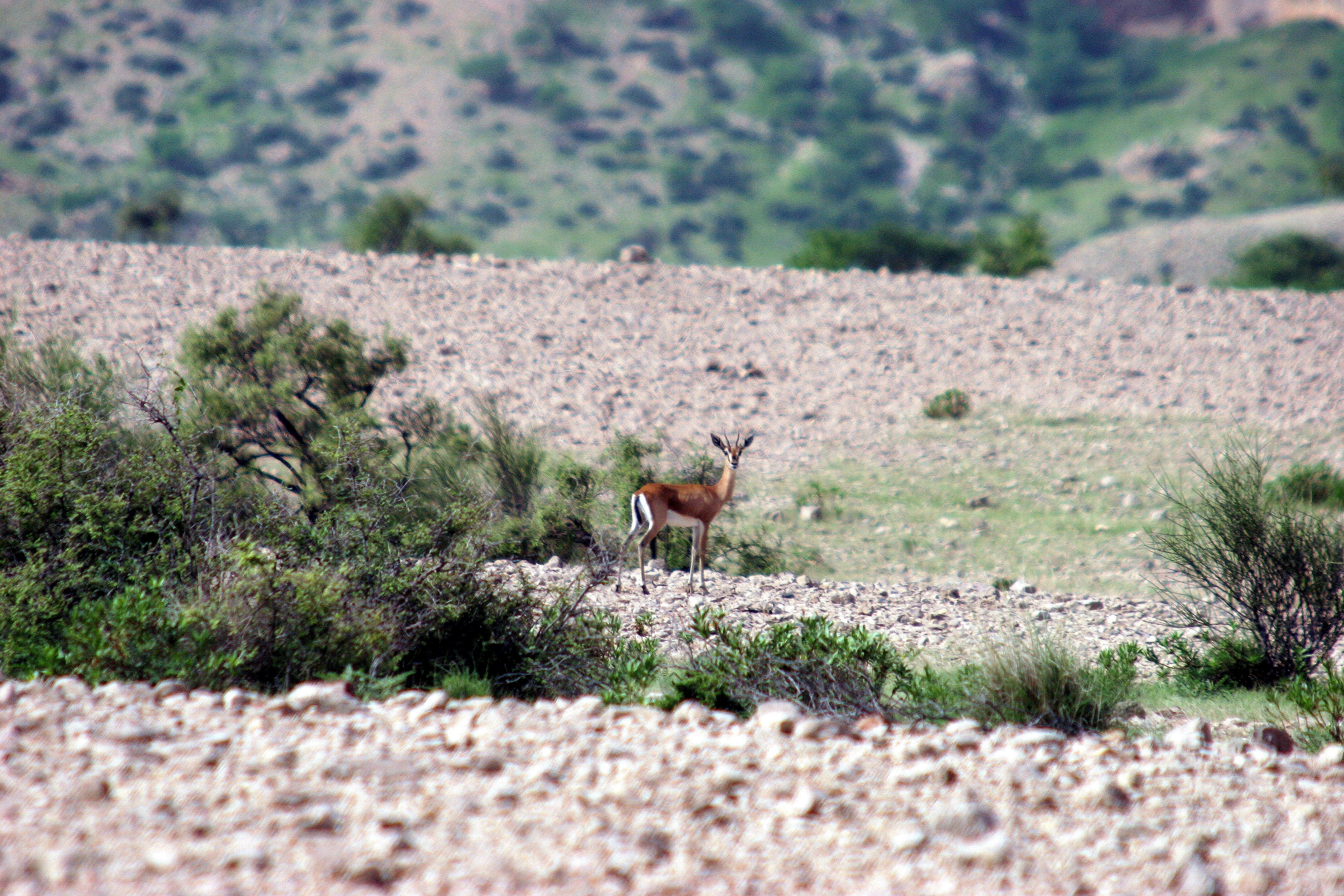
Chinkara in the Kirthar National Park

While the ecoregion does not support a large number of endemic species, it has a rich biodiversity due to the varied terrain, altitude, and landscape aspect. Over 300 species of bird have been recorded, the majority of which are migratory. Some of the animals here include the chinkara, markhor, Sindh ibex, Persian leopard, Indian wolf, urial and striped hyena.

== Protected areas ==
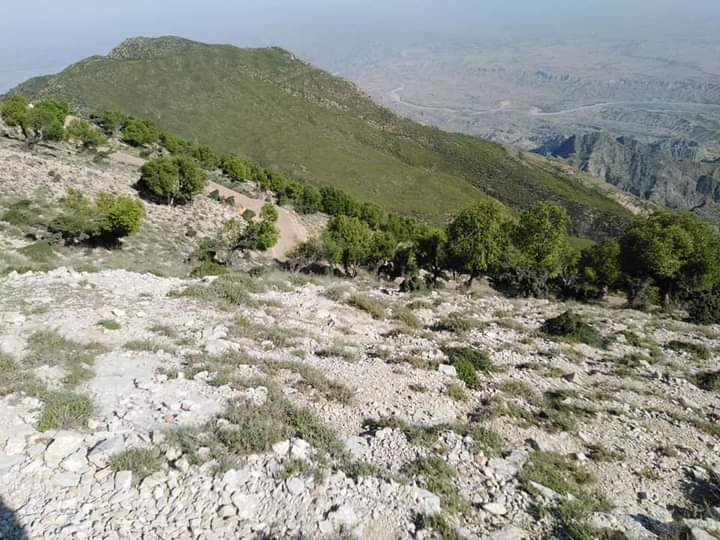
Shrublands of Sheikh Badin.

About 3.3% of the ecoregion is officially protected. These protected areas include:

- Chinji National Park
- Dhrun National Park
- Kirthar National Park
- Nuristan National Park
- Sheikh Badin National Park
- Bajwat Wildlife Sanctuary
- Borraka Wildlife Sanctuary
- Chorani Wildlife Sanctuary
- Chumbi Surla Wildlife Sanctuary
- Dureji Wildlife Sanctuary
- Ghondak Dhono Wildlife Sanctuary
- Khabbeke Lake Wildlife Sanctuary
- Koh-e-Geish Wildlife Sanctuary
- Kolwah Kap Wildlife Sanctuary
- Mahal Kohistan Wildlife Sanctuary
- Manglot Wildlife Sanctuary
- Maslakh Wildlife Sanctuary
- Ras Koh Wildlife Sanctuary
- Raghai Rakhshan Wildlife Sanctuary
- Rasool Barrage Wildlife Sanctuary
- Shashan Wildlife Sanctuary
- Ziarat Juniper Wildlife Sanctuary
