= Registan–North Pakistan sandy desert =

Ecoregion in Afghanistan, Iran, and Pakistan

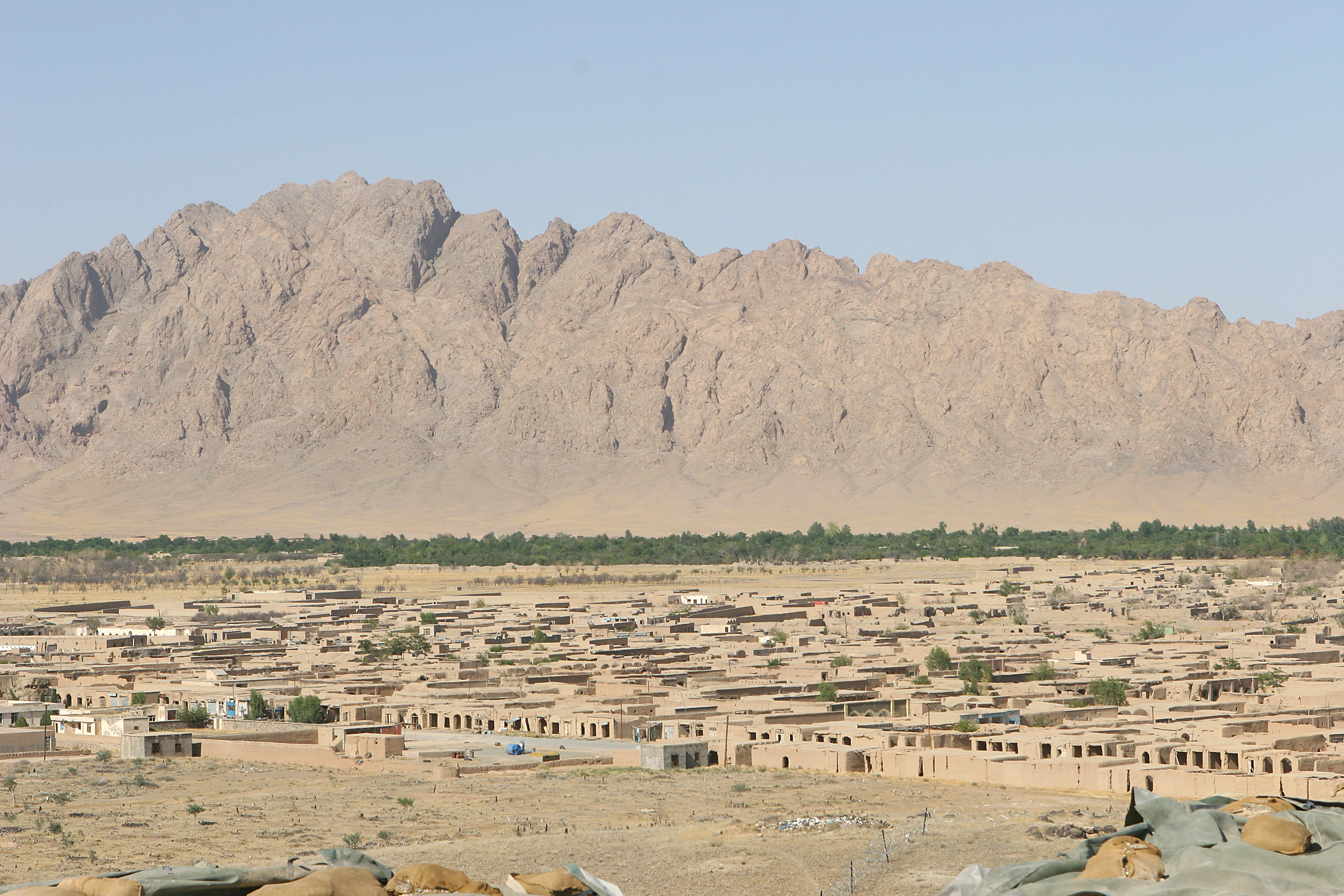
- Nawzad, Afghanistan

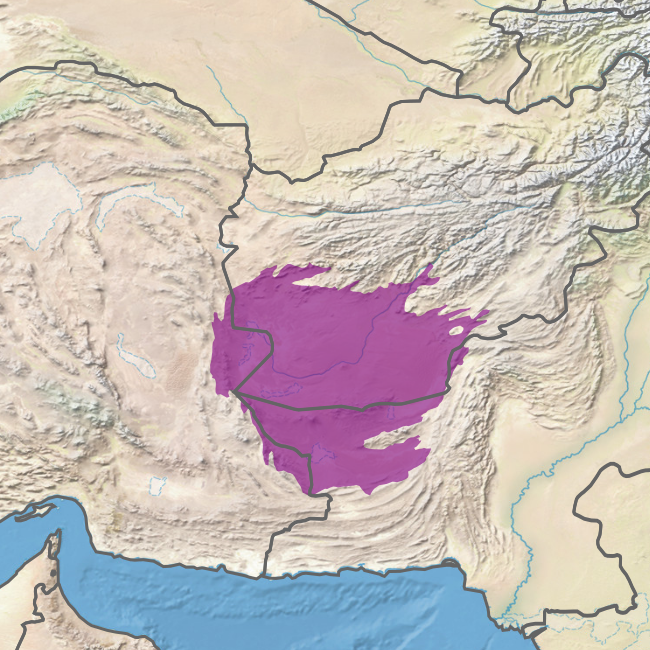
- Ecoregion territory (in purple)

Ecology
- Realm: Palearctic
- Biome: Deserts and xeric shrublands
- Borders: Baluchistan xeric woodlands; Central Afghan Mountains xeric woodlands; Central Persian desert basins, Kuh Rud and Eastern Iran montane woodlands

Geography
- Area: 277,916 km^{2} (107,304 mi^{2})
- Countries: Afghanistan; Iran, Pakistan
- Coordinates: 39.25°N 63.25°E

Conservation
- Protected: 1.44%

The Registan–North Pakistan sandy desert ecoregion (WWF ID: PA1326) covers the dry Sistan Basin of southern Afghanistan and portions of eastern Iran and southwest Pakistan. The Registan Desert is the eastern portion of the Sistan Basin. The region is almost entirely dry sandy desert, with some irrigated cropland along the rivers. There are some seasonal wetlands at the western terminus of the Helmand River into Hamun Lake. The region support five endemic species of reptiles.

== Location and description ==
The ecoregion basin is about 500 km (310 mi) across, surrounded by mountains. The Helmand River flows through the desert from the northeast (at Kandahar) to the southwest, where it empties into the endorheic (no outlet to the sea) Hamun Lake. The lowest point of the basin is the Godzareh Depression, at 466 metres (1,529 ft). The mean elevation of the ecoregion is 878 metres (2,881 ft), and the highest point is 2,760 metres (9,060 ft). There are three distinct deserts in the basin - the Dasht-e Margo, the Registan Desert, and the Dasht-e Khash.

To the north are the Central Mountain ranges of Afghanistan, which are themselves the western extensions of the Hindu Kush Mountains. To the east are the Sulaiman Mountains of Pakistan, to the south the Central Makran Range in Pakistan, and to the west the Central Persian desert basins region. Across the middle run the granite Chagai Hills along the Afghan-Pakistan border.

== Climate ==
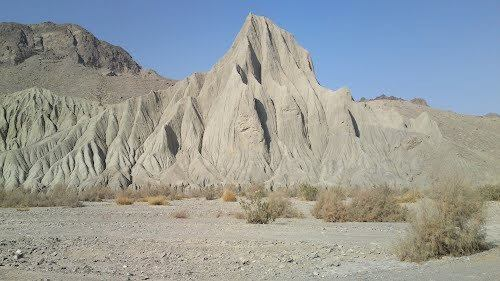
Nushki District, Pakistan.

The climate of the ecoregion is Cold desert climate (Köppen climate classification (BWk)). This climate features hot desert conditions in the summer, but cooler than hot deserts. Winters are cold and dry. At least one month averages below 0 °C (32 °F).

== Flora and fauna ==
The basin is one of the driest regions on earth; 95% of the territory is bare or sparse vegetation. 4% of the land is cultivated, being irrigated on fertile land along the main rivers - the Helmand River, the Farah River, and the Khash River.

Species richness is fairly high for a desert, with 391 species of vertebrates including mammals like the goitered gazelle and sand cat. But the only endemic species are a small number of reptiles: the Afghan toadhead agama (Phrynocephalus clarkorum), Missone's gecko (Rhinogekko misonnei), the Point-snouted racerunner (Eremias acutirostris) (a lizard), and the Dark head dwarf-racer (Eirenis mcmahoni).

== Protected areas ==
Less than 2% of the ecoregion is officially protected. These protected areas include:

- Hamun Lake
- Ras Koh Wildlife Sanctuary
