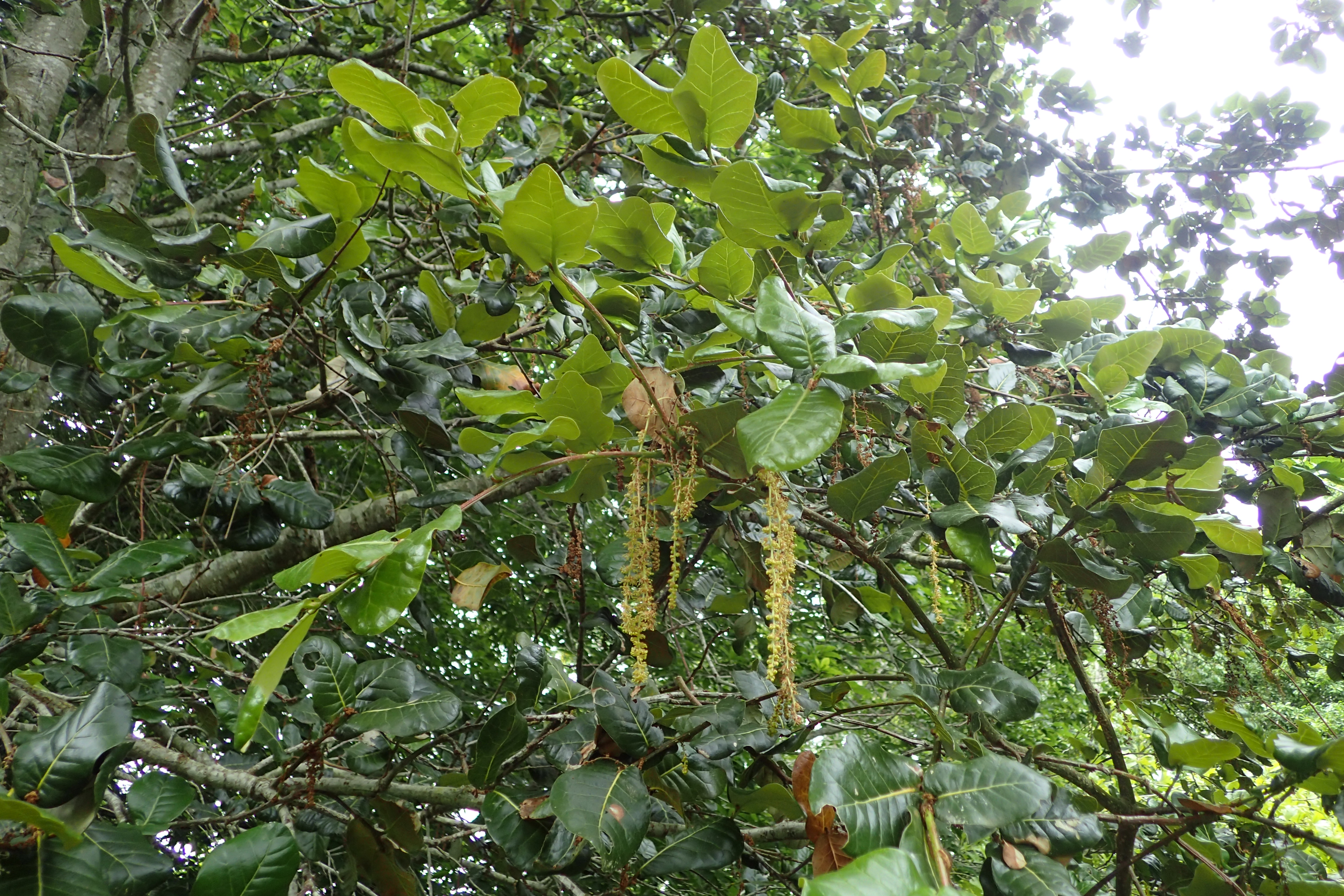

Conservation status
- Least Concern (IUCN 3.1)

Scientific classification
- Kingdom: Plantae
- Clade: Embryophytes
- Clade: Tracheophytes
- Clade: Spermatophytes
- Clade: Angiosperms
- Clade: Eudicots
- Clade: Rosids
- Order: Fagales
- Family: Fagaceae
- Genus: Quercus
- Subgenus: Quercus subg. Cerris
- Section: Quercus sect. Ilex
- Species: Q. semecarpifolia

Binomial name
- Quercus semecarpifolia Sm.

Synonyms
- Quercus cassura Buch.-Ham. ex D.Don; Quercus obtusifolia D.Don

= Quercus semecarpifolia =

Species of oak tree

Quercus semecarpifolia is an Asian species of oak. It is native to the Himalayas and nearby mountains, from eastern Afghanistan through Pakistan, northern India, Nepal, Tibet, and Myanmar to northern Thailand, where it is referred to as kharsu. It is classified in subgenus Cerris, section Ilex.

Quercus semecarpifolia is an evergreen tree up to 30 metres (98 feet) tall. The leaves are up to 12 centimetres (4 3/4 inches) long, with a few teeth along the sides but rounded at the tip. It has been grown in middle Europe, Western Germany, winter-hardiness zone 7, withstanding -14 °C, without any damages. It gives a good, showy bush to small tree with lush green leaves. The epithet semecarpifolia refers to a resemblance between the leaves of this species and those of Semecarpus anacardium.

In its native range, it serves as a keystone species, exhibiting up to 80% dominance at elevations between 2700 and 3300 meters. In areas where less degradation has occurred, Q. semecarpifolia reduces light at the forest floor, encouraging the growth of shade tolerant herbaceous species. Local people make use of kharsu more frequently than other native oaks for food, animal fodder, fuel, and timber. Its leaves are also known to support Antheraea proylei silk worms, goats, and prevent slug infestations.

== Fossil record ==
Fossils of Quercus semecarpifolia have been described from the fossil flora of Kızılcahamam district in Turkey, which is of early Pliocene age.
