= Sulaiman Range alpine meadows =

Ecoregion in Afghanistan and Pakistan

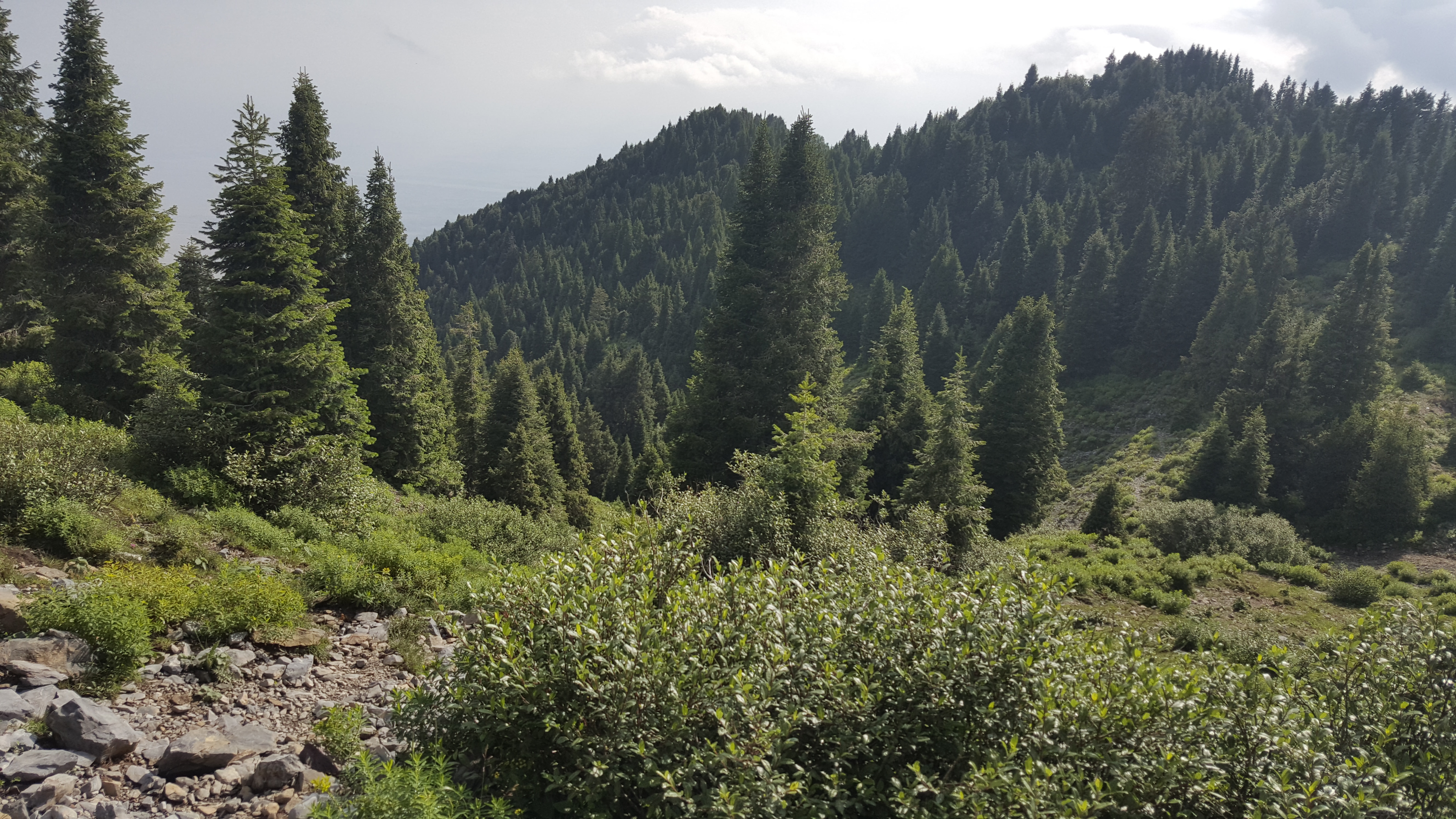
- Parachinar, Pakistan in Spīn Ghar Mountains

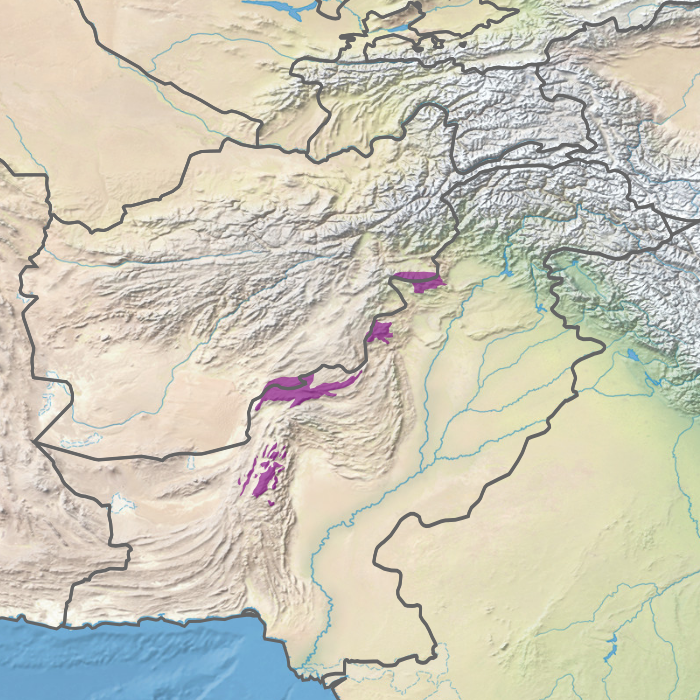
- Ecoregion territory (in purple)

Ecology
- Realm: Palearctic
- Biome: Montane grasslands and shrublands

Geography
- Area: 23,924 km^{2} (9,237 mi^{2})
- Country: Pakistan, Afghanistan
- Coordinates: 32.75°N 69.75°E

The Sulaiman Range alpine meadows ecoregion (WWF ID: PA1018) covers a series of higher altitude mountain ranges along the crest of the Sulaiman Mountains, a southerly extension of the Hindu Kush Mountains along the Afghanistan-Pakistan border. The area is relatively undeveloped, with about a third of the terrain either forested or in 'alpine steppe' shrub or herbaceous cover.

== Location and description ==
The ecoregion territory is mountainous, at an average elevation of 2,210 metres (7,250 ft). It is surrounded by the lower-elevation Baluchistan xeric woodlands ecoregion. There are four main sectors, from north to south:

- Spīn Ghar Range, on the south side of the Khyber Pass west of Peshawar.
- Waziristan, a mountainous area on the border with Afghanistan, roughly between the Kurram River in the north and the Gomal River in the south.
- Toba Kakar, a southern offshoot of the Sulaiman Mountains in the northwest of Balochistan Province.
- Kalat District regional mountainous, another offshoot of the Sulaiman Mountains located south of Quetta, above the town of Kalat

== Climate ==
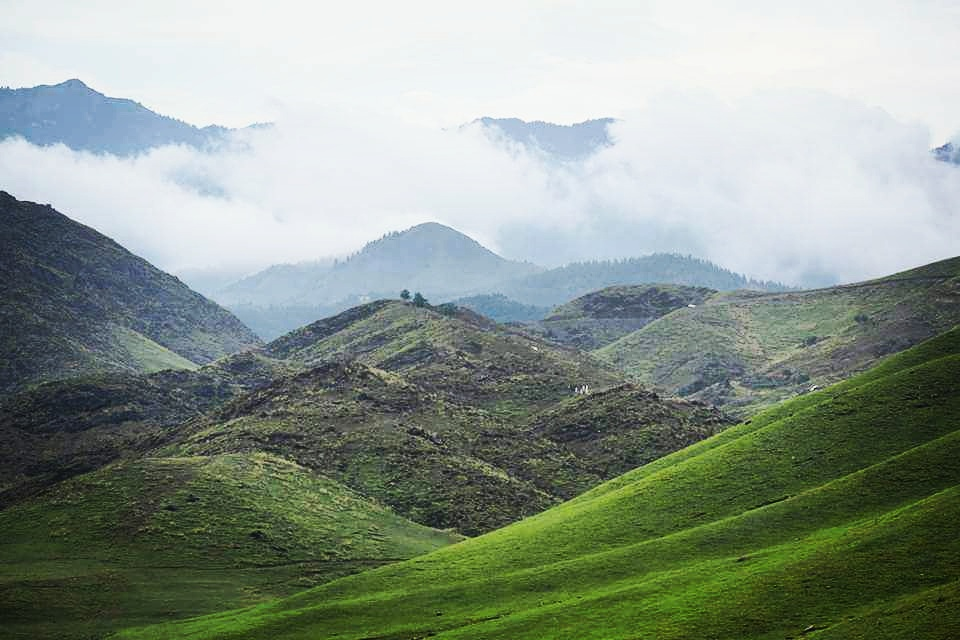
Hill meadows in South Waziristan.

The climate of the ecoregion is Humid continental climate, warm summer (Köppen climate classification (Dwb)), with a dry winter. This climate is characterized by large seasonal temperature differentials and a warm summer (at least four months averaging over 10 °C (50 °F), but no month averaging over 22 °C (72 °F), and cold winters having monthly precipitation less than one-tenth of the wettest summer month. Precipitation averages less than 225 mm/year.

== Flora and fauna ==
Because the ecoregion is arid and the ground often gravel or scree, 68% of the terrain is bare ground or sparse vegetation. 15% is shrubs or herbaceous cover, 12% is open forest, and 5% is closed forest. Much of the cover is scattered tufts of bunch grasses and plants of genus Onobrychis and Acantholimon (prickly thrift). The forest cover is mostly in gullies, or in the wetter slopes of the northern sections. Trees in these elevations are of Mediterranean character, including genus Fagaceae, Nerium (oleander trees or shrubs), Picea smithiana and Afghan ash trees (Fraxinus xanthoxyloides).

There are 50 mammal species recorded in the ecoregion, and 150 bird species. Four of them are endemic to the region, and many are of conservation interest as vulnerable or endangered species for which this habitat is important because of the relative isolation and low density of human habitation. Mammals include:

- Markhor, endemic subspecies
- Chiltan ibex, endemic
- Urial, endemic subspecies
- Chinkara
- Persian leopard
- Balochistan forest dormouse, endemic

== Protected areas ==
Less than 1% of the ecoregion is officially protected.
