= Indus Valley Desert =

Ecoregion of Pakistan

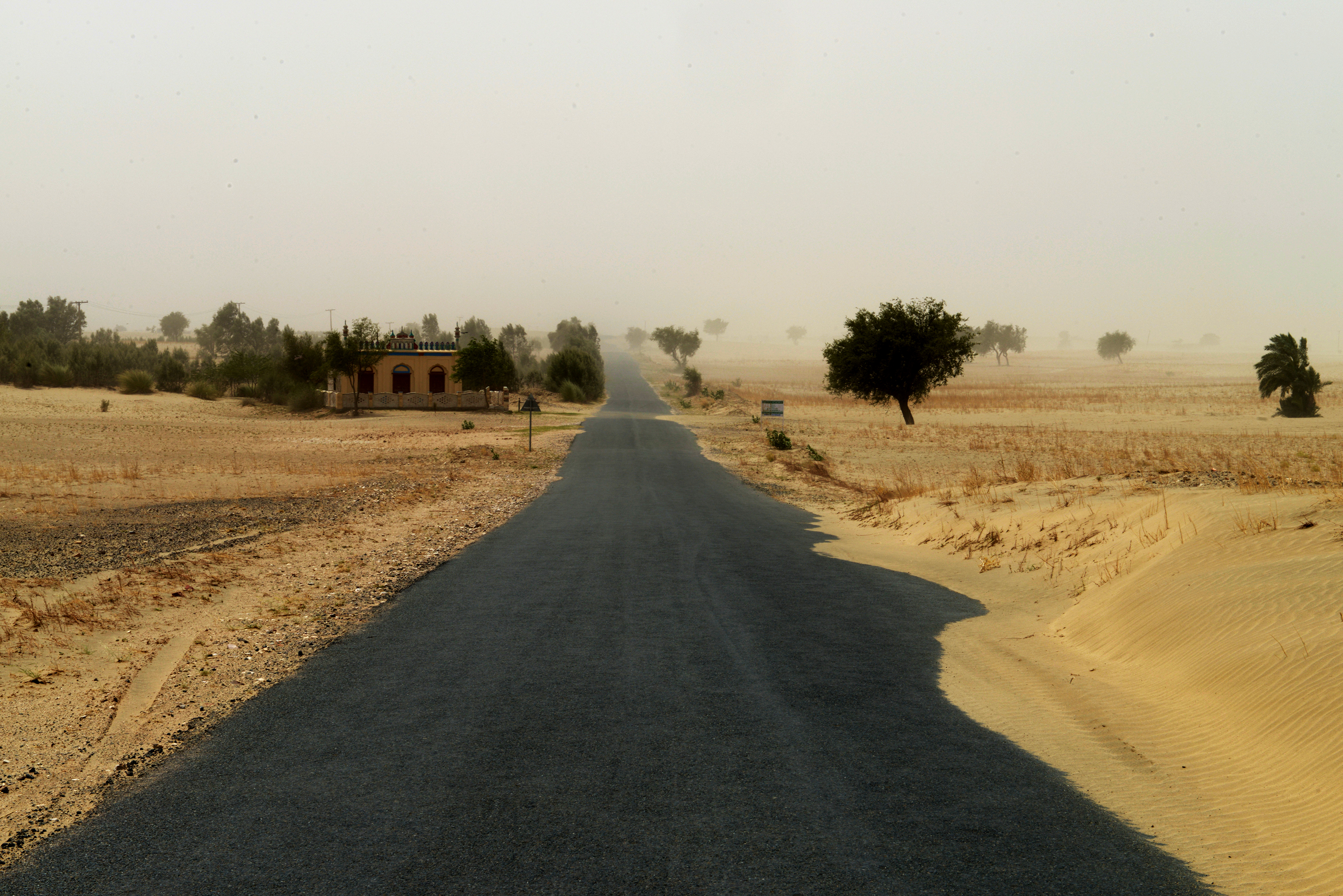

- Location within Pakistan

Naming
- Native name: صحرا وادی اندس (Urdu)

Geography
- Country: Pakistan
- State: Punjab
- Coordinates: 31°15′N 71°40′E
- Interactive map of Indus Valley Desert

The Indus Valley Desert is an almost uninhabited desert ecoregion of central Pakistan.

== Location and description ==
The Indus Valley desert covers an area of 19,501 square kilometers (7,529 sq mi) in northwestern Punjab Province between the Chenab and Indus rivers. The Indus Valley Desert is drier and less hospitable than the northwestern thorn scrub forests that surround it with temperatures ranging from freezing in winter to extremely hot (more than 45 °C (113 °F)) in summer with only 400–600 mm (20–20 in) of rainfall per year.

== Biodiversity ==
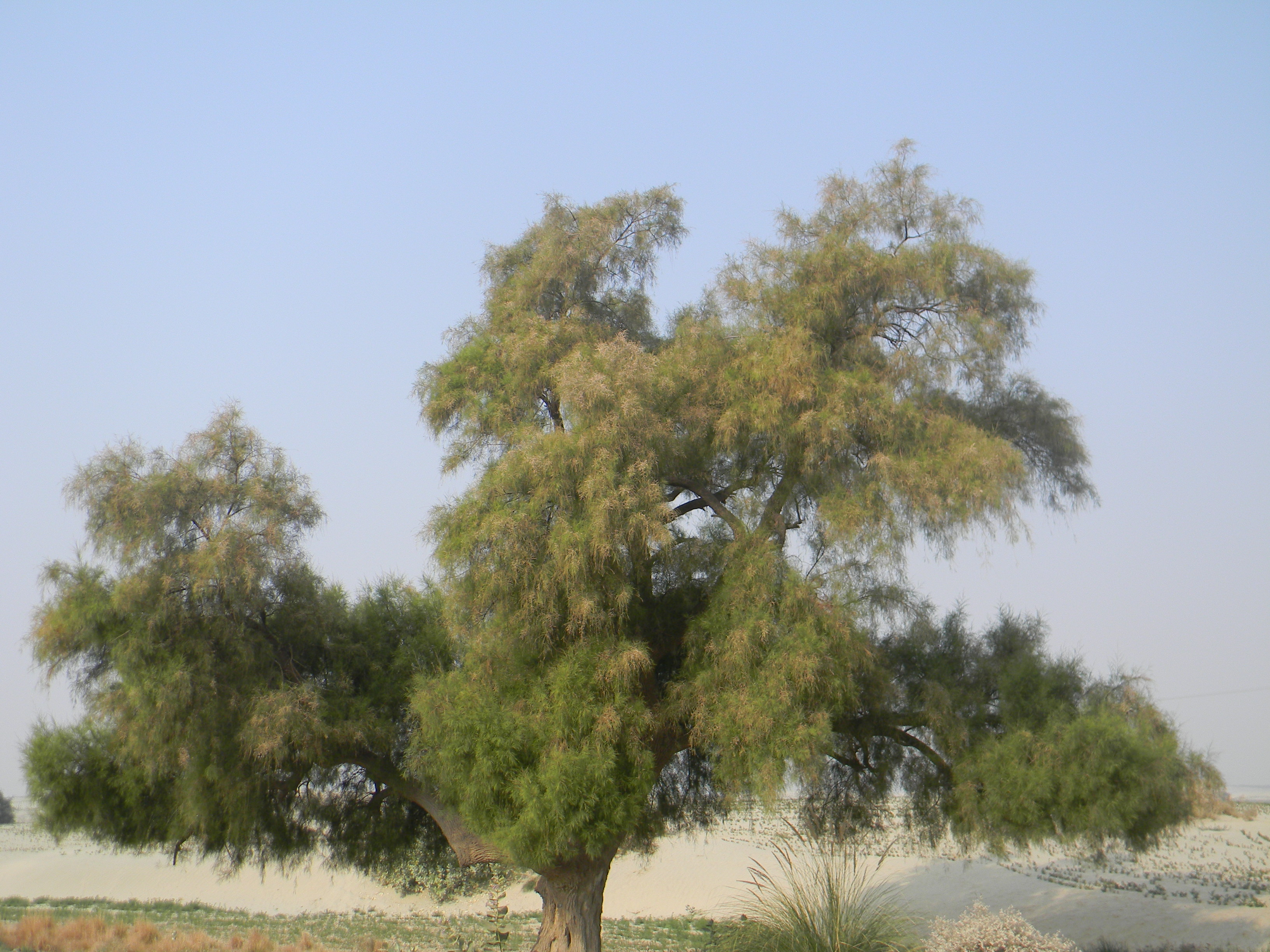
Tamarix aphylla in the desert.

=== Flora ===
The desert vegetation is quite varied due to the variety of temperatures with Khejri and Tamarix shrubs being the characteristic species.

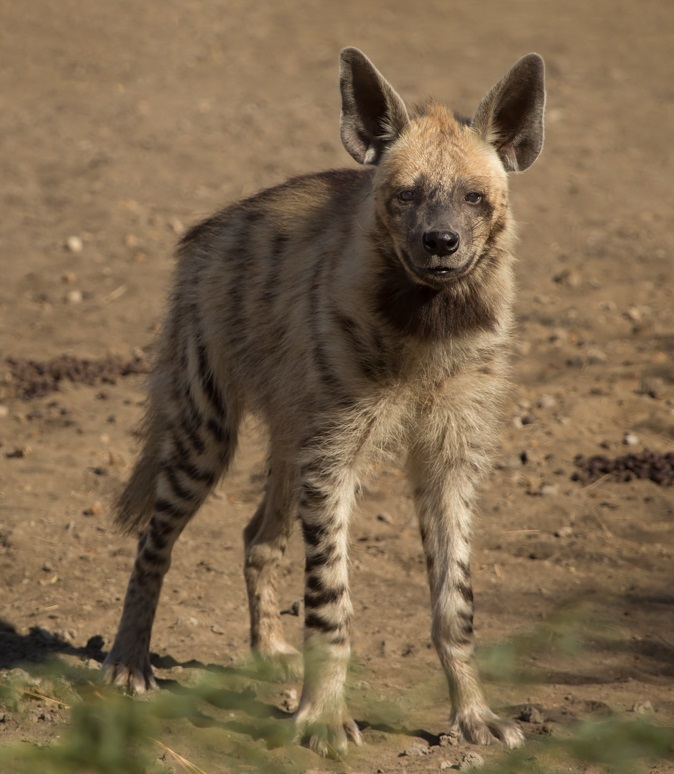
Adult Striped hyena.

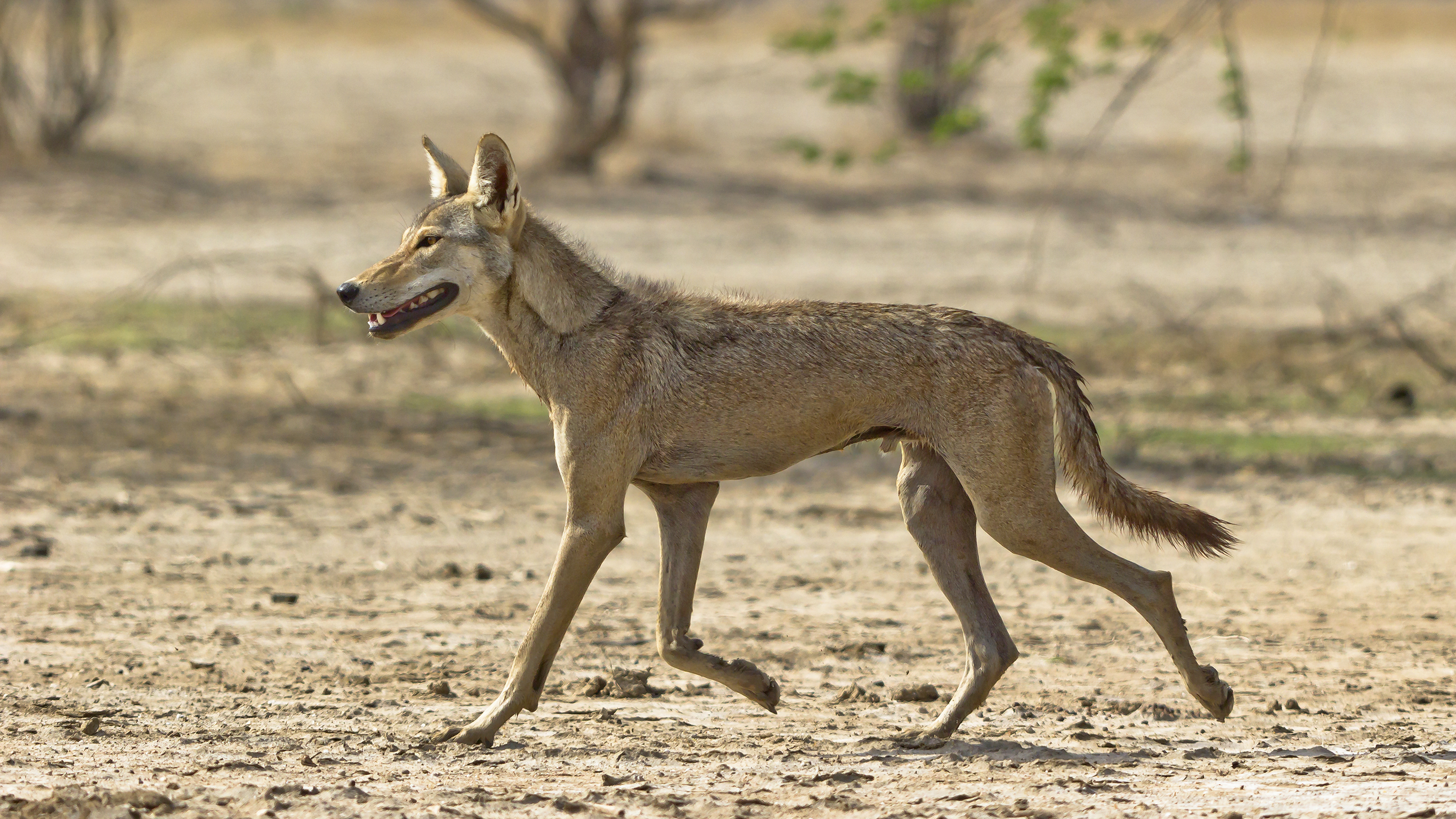
Indian wolf roam in desert.

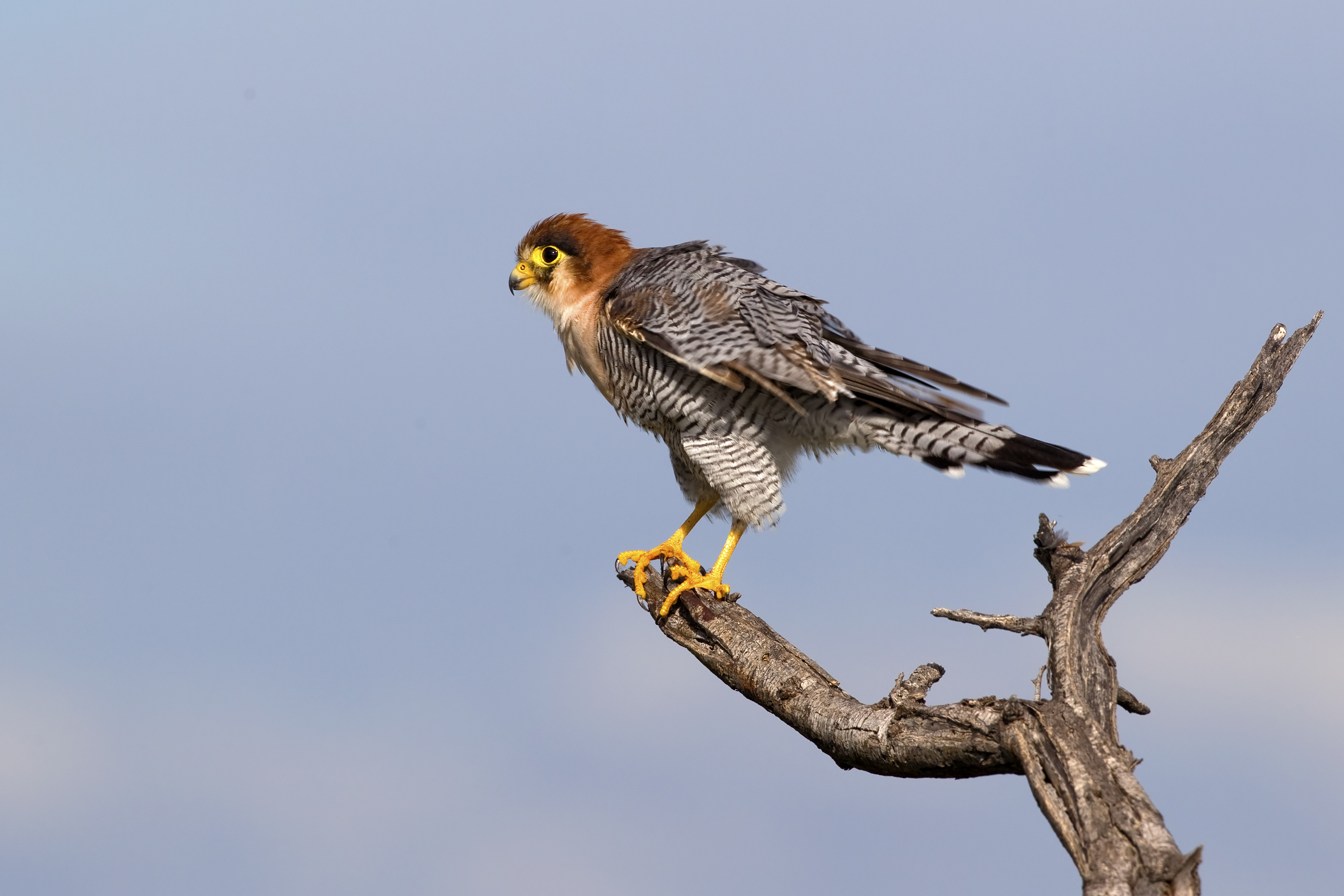
Red-necked falcon, one of the bird species found in Indus Valley Desert.

=== Fauna ===
The desert is home to five large mammals: Indian wolf, striped hyena, caracal, Indian leopard and the urial (Ovis orientalis punjabensis) along with many rodents and other mammals. Meanwhile, the 190 species of bird in the desert include the red-necked falcon.

== Threats and preservation ==
Like the nearby Thar Desert, the Indus Valley desert has little farming or grazing due to its hard climate and therefore the natural habitats are almost intact. A 2017 study estimated approximately 12,176 square kilometers in protected areas.

However, hunting still goes on and is a threat to caracals, wolves and other mammals.

== See also ==
- Thal Desert
