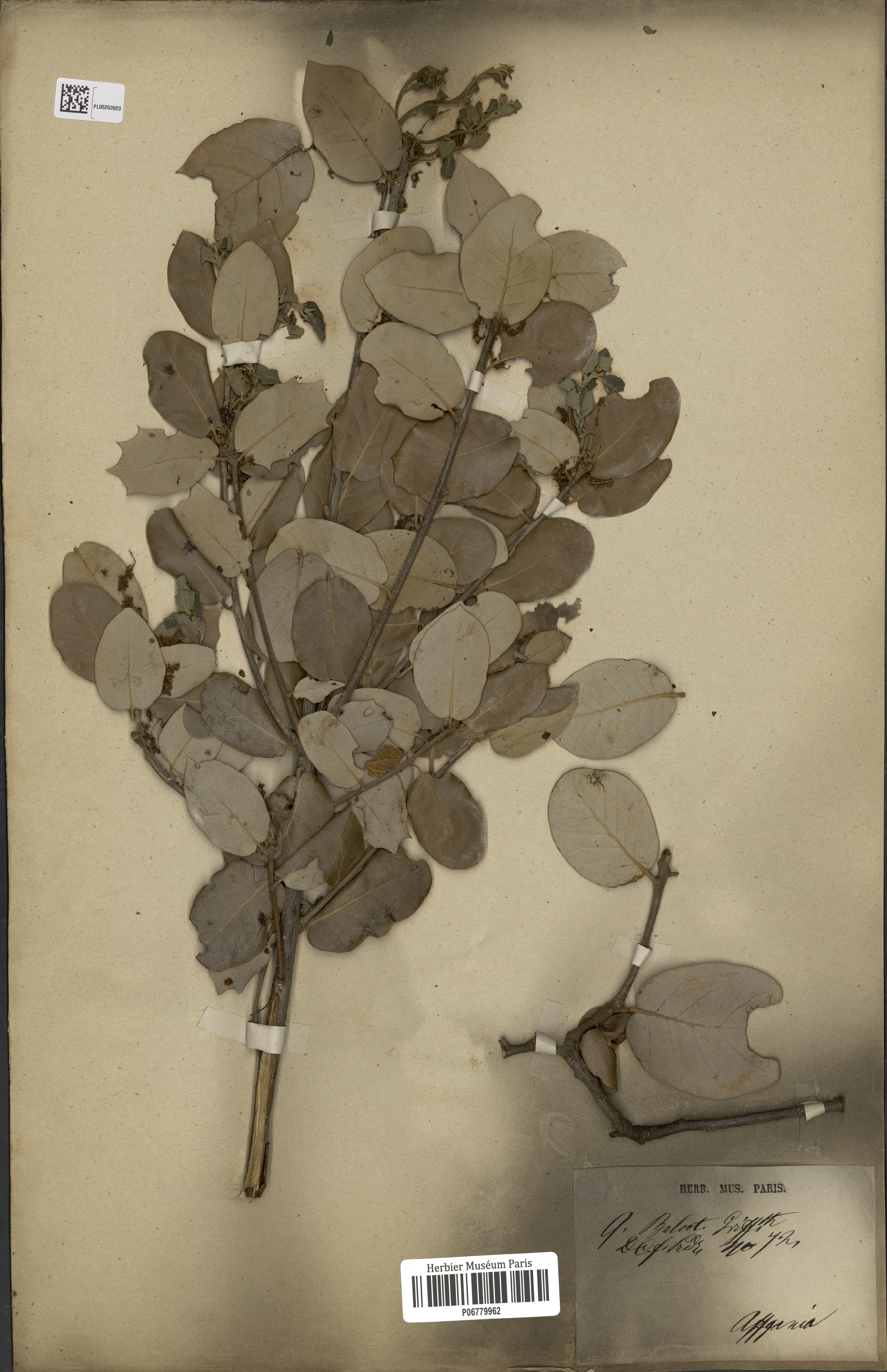
- Quercus baloot

Conservation status
- Least Concern (IUCN 3.1)

Scientific classification
- Kingdom: Plantae
- Clade: Embryophytes
- Clade: Tracheophytes
- Clade: Spermatophytes
- Clade: Angiosperms
- Clade: Eudicots
- Clade: Rosids
- Order: Fagales
- Family: Fagaceae
- Genus: Quercus
- Subgenus: Quercus subg. Cerris
- Section: Quercus sect. Ilex
- Species: Q. baloot

Binomial name
- Quercus baloot Griff.

Synonyms
- Quercus ilicifolius Griff.

= Quercus baloot =

Species of oak tree

Quercus baloot, the holm oak or holly oak is a rare species of oak that was described by Griffith in 1848. It is classified in subgenus Cerris and section Ilex. It is native to the Himalayas from 1,000–3,000 metres (3,300–9,800 ft).

== Description ==
The species is an evergreen shrub that is 2.5–8 metres (8 ft 2 in – 26 ft 3 in) tall. It have leaves that are 2.5–7.5 centimetres (0.98–2.95 in) by 2.5–8 centimetres (0.98–3.15 in) long and are elliptic and obovate to oblong. They are also green in colour and have 3–4 millimetres (0.12–0.16 in) long petioles. Females' peduncles are 2–4.2 centimetres (0.79–1.65 in) long and are located on the flowers. It also have stamens that have hairs that are 1.2 millimetres (0.047 in) long and 2 millimetres (0.079 in) long filaments. The cupule is 1.2–1.3 centimetres (0.47–0.51 in) wide while the acorn itself is 1.5–1.7 centimetres (0.59–0.67 in) long.

== Distribution ==
It is found in Afghanistan, Pakistan, and India (Jammu and Kashmir and Himachal Pradesh).
