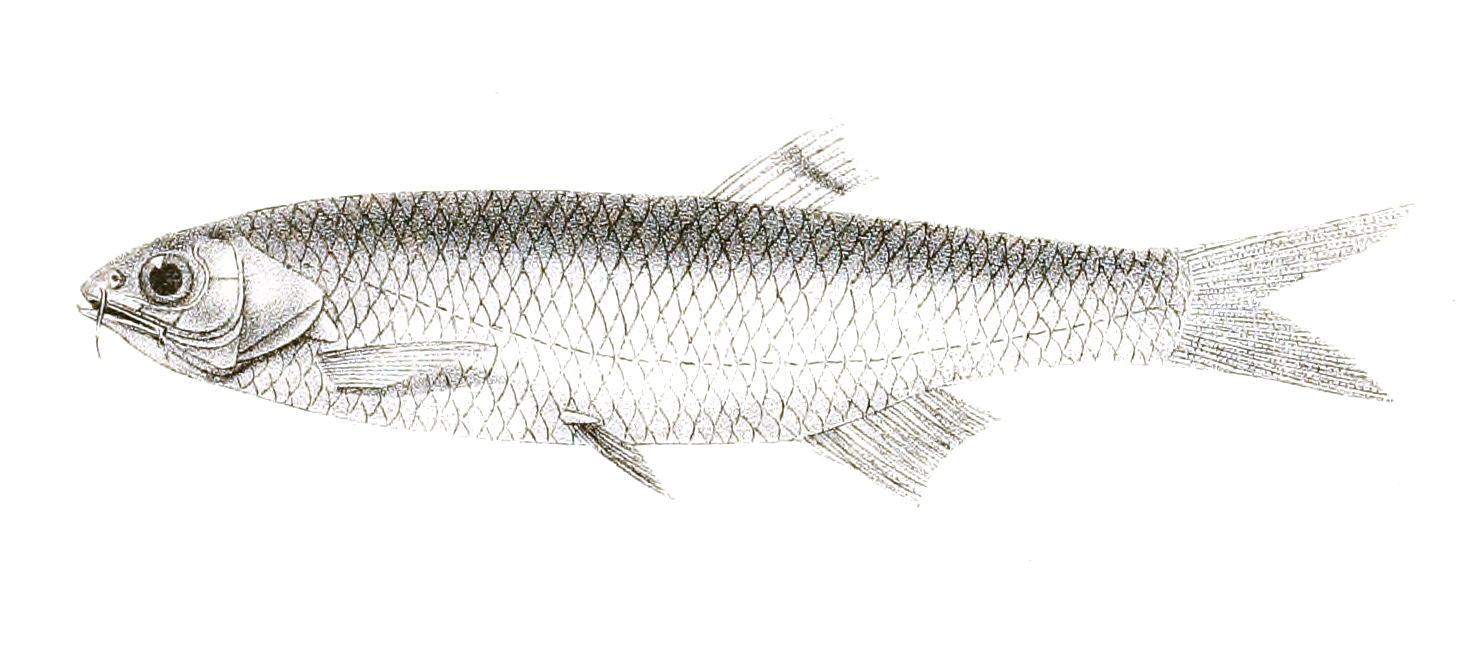

Scientific classification
- Kingdom: Animalia
- Phylum: Chordata
- Class: Actinopterygii
- Order: Cypriniformes
- Family: Danionidae
- Genus: Barilius
- Species: B. modestus

Binomial name
- Barilius modestus F. Day, 1872

= Barilius modestus =

Species of fish

Barilius modestus is a fish in genus Barilius of the family Cyprinidae.
