= Ormara Turtle Beaches =

Beach in Balochistan, Pakistan

- Beach
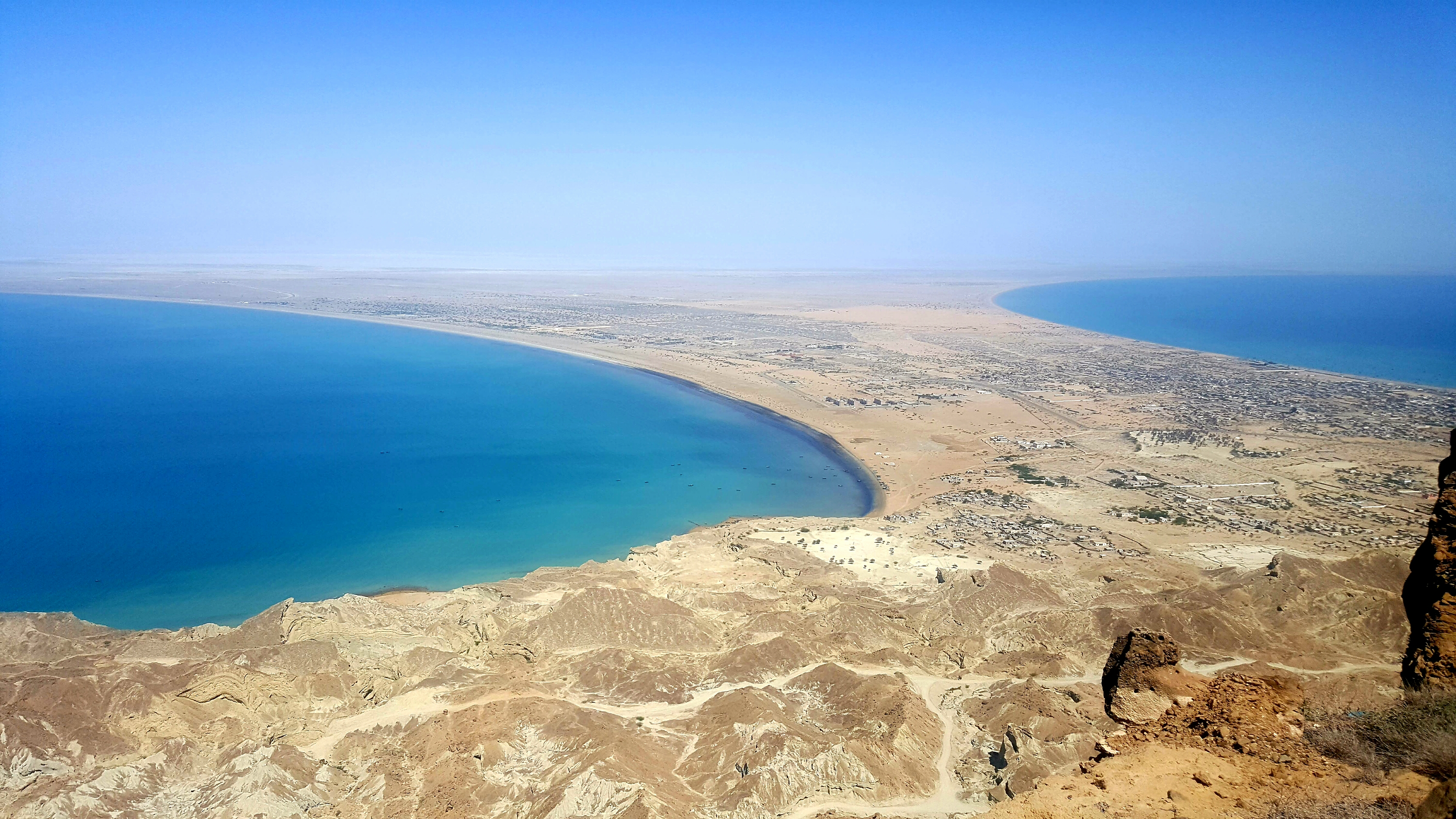
- Double crescent beach, part of the Ormara Turtle Beaches
- Interactive map of Ormara Turtle Beaches
- Coordinates: 25.169°N 64.627°E
- Location: Ormara, Pakistan
- Part of: Makran
- Offshore water bodies: Arabian Sea, northern Indian Ocean
- Formed by: Sand

Dimensions
  - Length: 10 km

The Ormara Turtle Beaches are sandy beach stretching over 10 km along the Makran coast of Balochistan in Pakistan. Covering an area of 2,400 hectares, it was designated a Ramsar Site (No. 1070) on 10 May 2001.

It is one of the largest turtle nesting sites along the coast of Pakistan.

Designations

Ramsar Wetland
- Official name: Ormara Turtle Beaches
- Designated: 10 May 2001
- Reference no.: 1070

== Flora ==
Vegetation consists mainly of salt-resistant plants that can grow in scarce freshwater conditions.

== Fauna ==
A considerable number of marine turtles are supported here including the endangered olive ridley and green turtles. It is possible that the hawksbill turtle is also supported. There are no significant numbers of migratory birds.

== Threats ==
The capture of turtles for export and the accumulation of plastic debris.
