= Chashma and Taunsa Barrage Dolphin Sanctuary =

Sanctuary in Punjab, Pakistan

Chashma and Taunsa Barrage Dolphin Sanctuary is located in Mianwali District, Punjab, Pakistan. It was declared open to the public in 1972. Since the 1970s, the population of the Indus river dolphins has significantly increased there. It is a very important breeding and wintering area for a wide variety of waterfowl, regularly hosting 20000 birds. It is the largest preservation area for endangered indus dolphins.

The sanctuary has great potential for the development of eco-tourism in this part of Pakistan. Blind dolphins, an endemic species of the Indus River, can be observed here.
