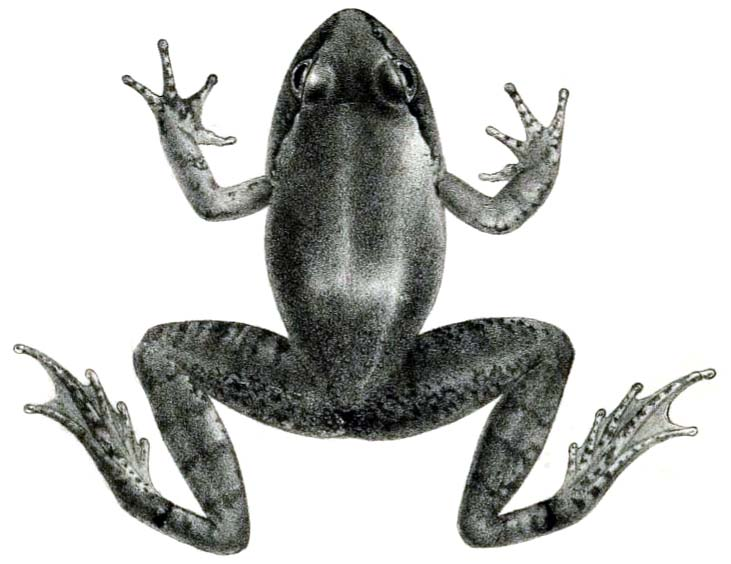

Conservation status
- Least Concern (IUCN 3.1)

Scientific classification
- Kingdom: Animalia
- Phylum: Chordata
- Class: Amphibia
- Order: Anura
- Family: Dicroglossidae
- Genus: Nanorana
- Species: N. vicina

Binomial name
- Nanorana vicina (Stoliczka, 1872)

Synonyms
- Paa vicina (Stoliczka, 1872)

= Nanorana vicina =

Species of frog

Nanorana vicina (common names: Himalaya paa frog, Stoliczka's frog, Murree frog) is a species of frog in the family Dicroglossidae.

== Location ==
It is found in the Himalayan front of northern India and Pakistan. Its natural habitats are high-altitude rivers, springs, and other running water in open forest and grassland habitats. There seem not to be any major threats to this species.

Behavior, habitat use patterns and morphometric traits of the overwintering tadpoles of this species has been found to be influenced by check dams built in the montane streams.
