= Picea smithiana =

Morinda spruce
- Morinda spruce in the Solang Valley in Himachal Pradesh, India

Conservation status
- Least Concern (IUCN 3.1)

Scientific classification
- Kingdom: Plantae
- Clade: Tracheophytes
- Clade: Gymnosperms
- Division: Pinophyta
- Class: Pinopsida
- Order: Pinales
- Family: Pinaceae
- Genus: Picea
- Species: P. smithiana

Binomial name
- Picea smithiana (Wall.) Boiss.

Synonyms
- Abies khutrow (Royle ex Turra) Loudon; Abies smithiana (Wall.) Lindl. Picea khutrow (Royle ex Turra) Carrière; Picea morinda Link; Picea smithiana var. nepalensis Franco; Picea smithiana subsp. nepalensis (Franco) Silba; Pinus morinda Gordon & Glend. Pinus pendula Griff. Pinus smithiana Wall.

Species of evergreen tree

Picea smithiana is a species of evergreen tree in the family Pinaceae family. It is referred to by the common names Indian spruce, morinda spruce and West Himalayan spruce, and is a spruce native to the western Himalaya and adjacent mountains, from northeast Afghanistan, northern Pakistan, India to central Nepal. It grows at altitudes of 2,400–3,600 m (7,900–11,800 ft) in forests together with deodar cedar, blue pine and pindrow fir.

== Description ==
Foliage and cones, in Bhyudar, Uttarakhand, India

Picea smithiana is a large tree, an evergreen growing to 50 metres (160 feet) tall, exceptionally to 60 m (200 ft), and with a trunk diameter of up to 1.5–2.5 m (4 ft 11 in – 8 ft 2 in). Young trees have a conical crown with level branches and usually pendulous branchlets, the crown becoming columnar in old trees.

The shoots are pale buff-brown, and glabrous (hairless). The leaves are needle-like, the longest of any spruce, 2.5–5 cm (0.98–1.97 in) long, rhombic in cross-section, mid-green with inconspicuous stomatal lines. The cones are broad cylindric-conic, 9–16 cm (3.5–6.3 in) long (rarely to 18 cm) and 3 cm broad, green when young, maturing buff-brown and opening to 4–6 cm broad 5–7 months after pollination; the scales are stiff and smoothly rounded.

Morinda spruce is a popular ornamental tree in large gardens in western Europe for its attractive pendulous branchlets. It is also grown to a small extent in forestry for timber and paper production, though its slower growth compared to Norway spruce reduces its importance outside of its native range.

== Etymology ==
Picea means 'pitch', and is derived from the ancient Latin word of the same meaning, pix. The name is in reference to the sticky sap produced by members of this genus.

The species name smithiana is named after James Edward Smith, an English botanist and the founder of the Linnaean Society. The vernacular name morinda derives from the tree's name in Nepali.
