= Central Afghan Mountains xeric woodlands =

Ecoregion in Afghanistan

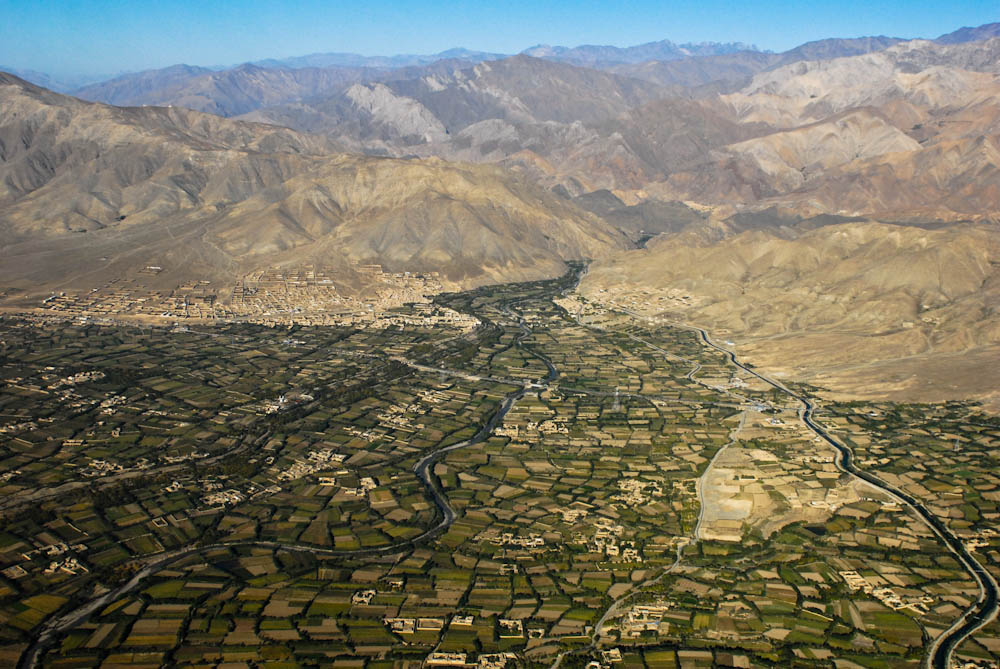
- View of Charikar, Afghanistan

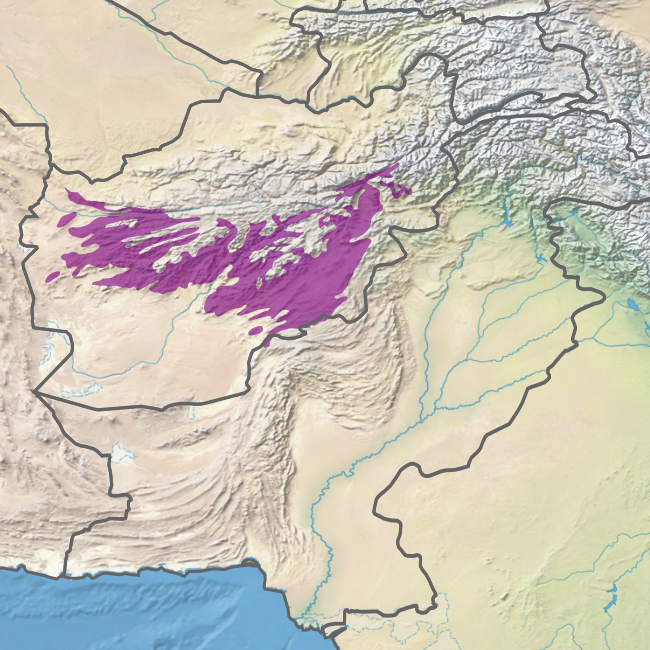
- Ecoregion territory (in purple)

Ecology
- Realm: Palearctic
- Biome: Deserts and xeric shrublands

Geography
- Area: 139,709 km^{2} (53,942 mi^{2})
- Country: Afghanistan, Pakistan
- Coordinates: 32.25°N 67.75°E

The Central Afghan Mountains xeric woodlands ecoregion (WWF ID: PA1309) covers the xeric (dry) eastern and southern slopes of the central mountain range of Afghanistan, between the sandy desert to the south and the alpine meadows in the higher, wetter region to the north. Despite the 'woodlands' in the ecoregion name, very little of the territory is forested – less than 1% – but is instead sparse vegetation or herbaceous cover.

== Location and description ==
The central mountain ranges of the Afghanistan are western extensions of the Hindu Kush mountains in the northeast of the country. These subranges center on the Koh-i-Baba (Baba Mountain Range) the Koh-e Paghman Mountains. The mean elevation is 2,058 metres (6,752 ft), with a highest peak being Kuh-e Kokzaro Zaghicha 5,125 metres (16,814 ft) at the northeastern extreme of the ecoregion.

== Climate ==
The climate of the ecoregion is Humid continental climate - Hot, dry summer sub-type (Köppen climate classification Dsa), with large seasonal temperature differentials and a hot summer (at least one month averaging over 22 °C (72 °F), and mild winters. The driest month between April and September does not have more than 30 millimeters of precipitation.

== Flora ==
According to satellite analysis, 65% of the ecoregion is bare or sparse vegetation, and another 27% is "herbaceous cover". There are communities of wild pistachio trees (Pistacia atlantica) at altitudes of 1,150-1,800 meters. Precipitation at these altitudes averages 250-400 mm/year. Higher, at 2,000-2,800 meters, Almond trees of genus Prunus mark a transition zone to the higher sub-alpine vegetation.

== Fauna ==
Of conservation interest in the ecoregion is the critically endangered Paghman mountain salamandar (Afghanodon mustersi). A large saline lake, Ab-i Istada in the ecoregion, is an important migratory stop in the Spring for waterfowl traveling between Siberia and the Ganges Plain of India. The site has a significant breeding population of American flamingos (Phoenicopterus ruber).

== Protected areas ==
There are no protected areas in this ecoregion.
