= List of ecoregions in Afghanistan =

The following is a list of ecoregions in Afghanistan, according to the World Wildlife Fund (WWF):

== Terrestrial ecoregions ==
=== Temperate coniferous forests ===
- East Afghan montane conifer forests

=== Temperate grasslands, savannas, and shrublands ===
- Gissaro-Alai open woodlands

=== Montane grasslands and shrublands ===
- Ghorat-Hazarajat alpine meadow
- Hindu Kush alpine meadow
- Karakoram-West Tibetan Plateau alpine steppe
- Northwestern Himalayan alpine shrub and meadows
- Pamir alpine desert and tundra
- Sulaiman Range alpine meadows

=== Deserts and xeric shrublands ===
- Afghan Mountains semi-desert
- Badkhiz-Karabil semi-desert
- Baluchistan xeric woodlands
- Central Afghan Mountains xeric woodlands
- Central Persian desert basins
- Paropamisus xeric woodlands
- Registan-North Pakistan sandy desert

== Freshwater ecoregions ==
- Helmand - Sistan
- Yaghistan
- Upper Amu Darya
