= Mountains of Central Asia =

Biodiversity hot spot in Asia

The Mountains of Central Asia are a biodiversity hot spot designated by Conservation International which covers several montane and alpine ecoregions of Central Asia, including those of the Pamir and Tian Shan ranges, and extending across portions of Afghanistan, China, Kazakhstan, Kyrgyzstan, Tajikistan, Uzbekistan, Pakistan and the Karakoram range in China, Pakistan and India. The Karakoram range is also known for Karakoram Anomaly which refers to the anomalous growth of glaciers in the central Karakoram, that is in contrast with melting glaciers in other mountainous ranges of Himalayas and other parts of the world due to the effects of climate change.

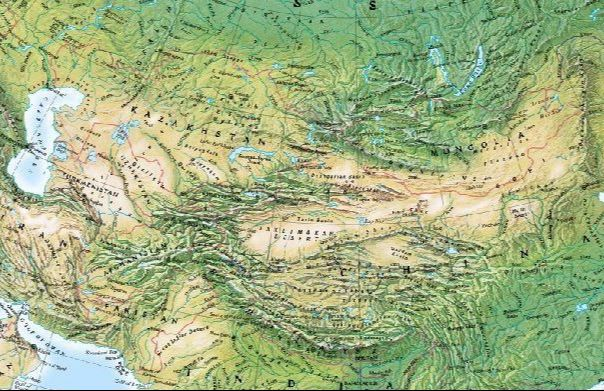
Central Asia physical map

The hotspot encompasses several habitat types, including montane grasslands and shrublands, temperate coniferous forests, and alpine tundra. The ecoregions in the hotspot include:

- Alai-Western Tian Shan steppe
- Gissaro-Alai open woodlands
- Pamir alpine desert and tundra
- Tian Shan montane steppe and meadows
- Tian Shan montane conifer forests
