= Karakoram–West Tibetan Plateau alpine steppe =

Montane grasslands and shrublands in parts of Pakistan, China, Afghanistan, and India

Karakoram-West Tibetan Plateau alpine steppe
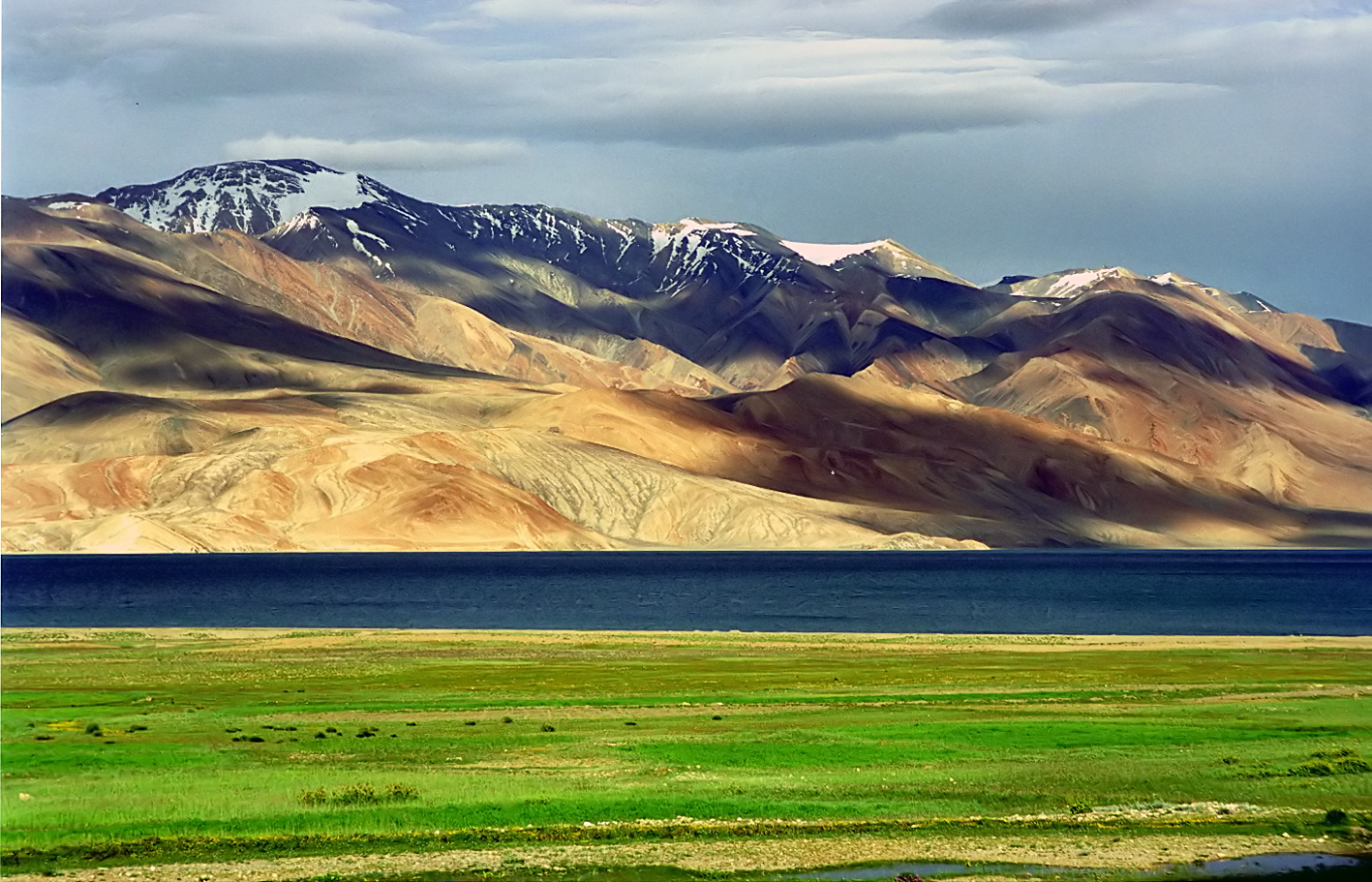
- Karakoram-West Tibetan Plateau alpine steppe near Ladakh, India

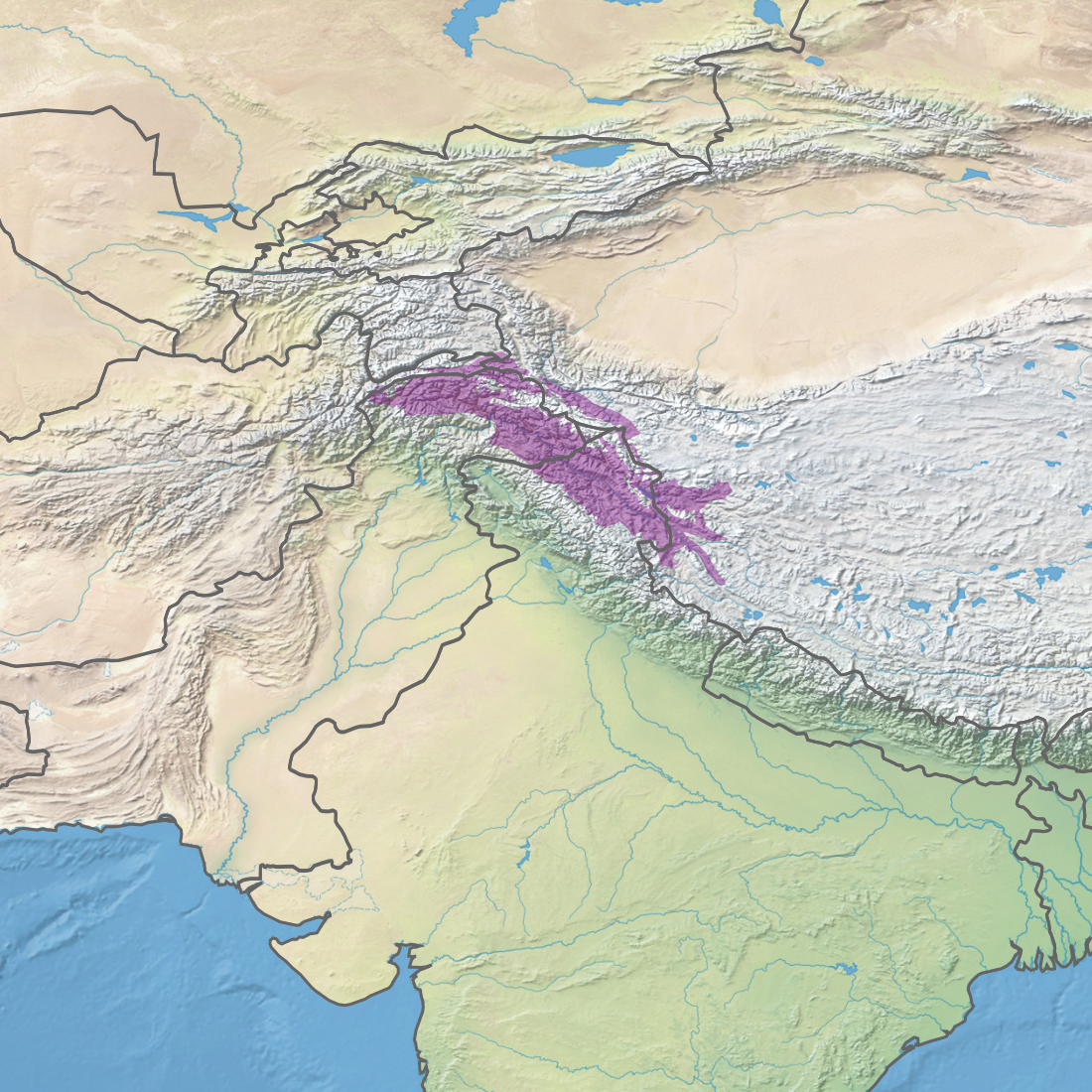
- Ecoregion territory (in purple)

Ecology
- Biome: Montane grasslands and shrublands
- Borders: List: Pamir alpine desert and tundra; North Tibetan Plateau-Kunlun Mountains and alpine desert; Central Tibetan Plateau alpine steppe; Western Himalayan alpine shrub and meadows; Northwestern Himalayan alpine shrub and meadows; Paropamisus xeric woodlands
- Bird species: 172
- Mammal species: 45

Geography
- Area: 143,300 km^{2} (55,300 mi^{2})
- Countries: India; China; Afghanistan; Pakistan

Conservation
- Habitat loss: 1.4065%
- Protected: 18.28%

The Karakoram-West Tibetan Plateau alpine steppe is a montane grasslands and shrublands ecoregion found in parts of Pakistan, China, Afghanistan, and India.

== Setting ==
The Karakoram-West Tibetan Plateau alpine steppe is an area of high-elevation grasslands covering 143,300 square kilometres (55,300 mi^{2}). It is centered on the Karakoram Range, west of the Himalaya Range. It also includes nearby ranges, such as the Ladakh Range.

== Climate ==
The mean annual precipitation in the ecoregion varies from 200 to 900 millimetres (7.9 to 35.4 in), 90 percent in the form of snow.

== Flora ==
Most of this ecoregion consists of grasslands and herbaceous plants. Protected slopes and ravines contains Salix denticulata, Mertensia tibetica, Potentilla desertorum, Juniperus polycarpus, Polygonum viviparum, Berberis pachyacantha, Rosa webbiana, and Spiraea lycoides. Where vegetation ceases to grow, around 4,500 metres (14,800 ft), are found Delphinium cashmerianum, Glechoma tibetica, Silene longicarpophora, Potentilla fruticosa, and Nepeta spp.

Shrublands and woodlands are found in valley bottoms. These include Hippophae rhamnoides, Myricaria elegans, Salix viminalis, Capparis spinosa, Tribulus terrestris, Pegamum harmala, Sophora alopecuroides, and Lycium ruthenicum. A few remnant steppe forests of Juniperus seravschanica and Juniperus indica are still found here.

== Fauna ==
Sheep in this ecoregion include the Marco Polo sheep, Tibetan argali, and urial. Goats include the markhor and ibex.

The sheep and goats, as well as smaller mammals, make this ecoregion excellent habitat for the snow leopard.

Both the brown bear and Himalayan black bear are found here.

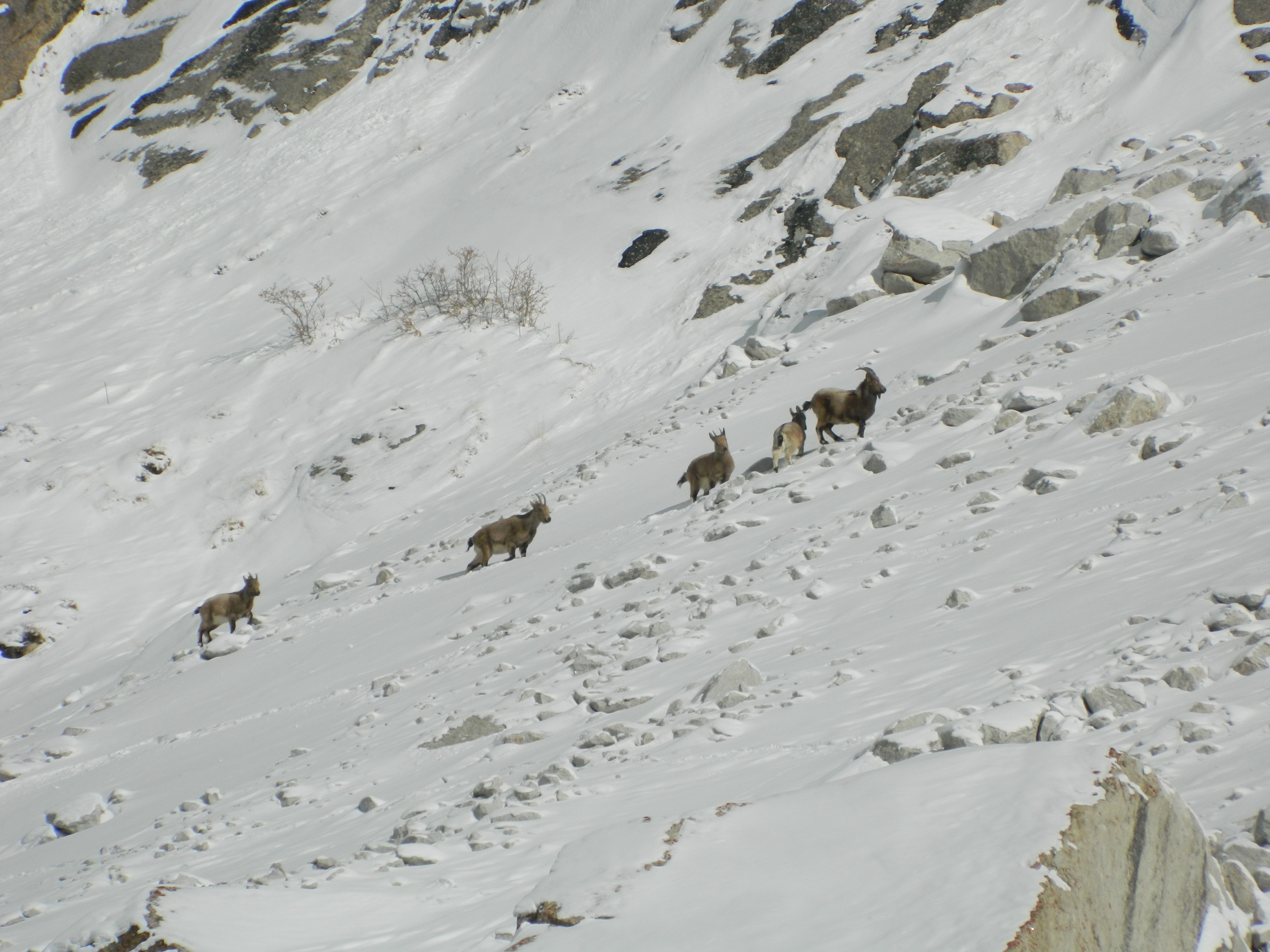
Siberian ibex herd in Ghanche, Pakistan.

Bird species richness is low. Common birds include Guldenstadt's redstart, Himalayan monal, rosefinches, raptors, and vultures.

== Conservation ==
Much of the montane habitat in this ecoregion lies in protected areas. These include

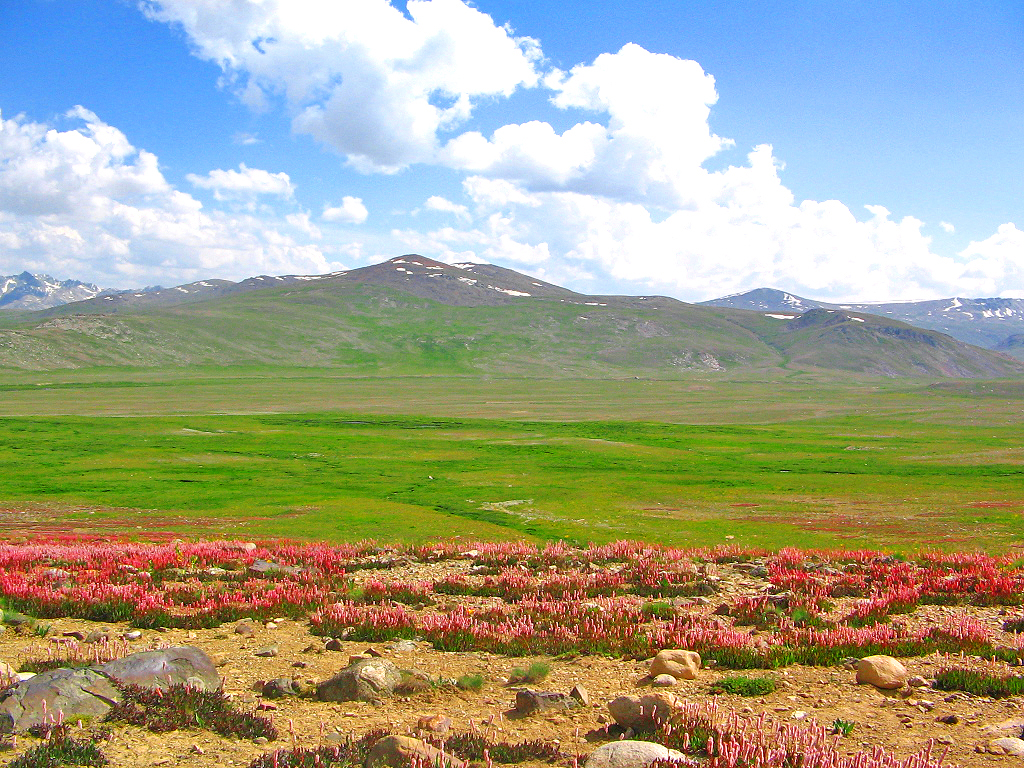
- Deosai National Park in Pakistan.
  Central Karakoram National Park
- Hemis National Park
- Khunjerab National Park
- Deosai National Park
- Shandur National Park

== See also ==
- List of ecoregions in India
