= Gissaro–Alai open woodlands =

Ecoregion in Central Asia

Gissaro-Alai open woodlands
- Baxmal District, Jizzakh Region, Uzbekistan

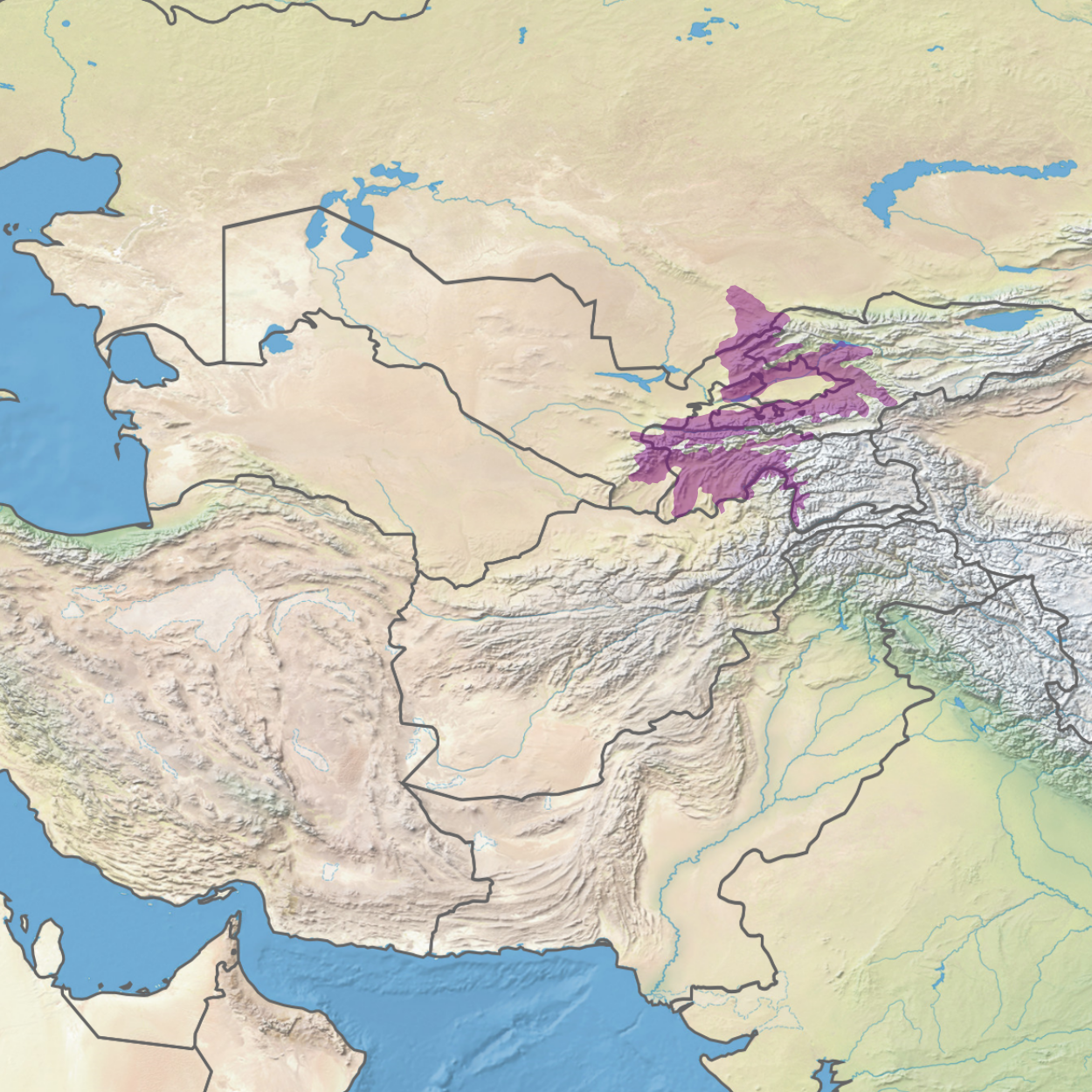
- Ecoregion territory (in purple)

Ecology
- Realm: Palearctic
- Biome: Temperate grasslands, savannas, and shrublands
- Borders: List: Alai–Western Tian Shan steppe; Badghyz and Karabil semi-desert; Central Asian northern desert; Hindu Kush alpine meadow; Pamir alpine desert and tundra; Paropamisus xeric woodlands; Tian Shan montane conifer forests; Tian Shan montane steppe and meadows

Geography
- Area: 168,090 km^{2} (64,900 mi^{2})
- Countries: List: Kazakhstan; Kyrgyzstan; Tajikistan, Uzbekistan; Afghanistan
- Coordinates: 40.75°N 70.25°E

The Gissaro-Alai open woodlands ecoregion (WWF ID: PA0808) covers the western foothills winding around two western offshoots of the Tian Shan Mountains in western Tajikistan, and parts of eastern Uzbekistan and western Kyrgyzstan, in Central Asia. The woodlands are typically of Juniper trees and shrubs, fitting the altitude zone situated between the desert valley floor (mostly on the west), and the tree line, above which the mountain ridges are glaciated and barren.

== Location and description ==
The ecoregion winds its way around two chains of mountain ranges that extend westward from the Tian Shan Mountains. The northern chain is a direct extension of the Tian Shan, the southern chain is composed of (from west to east) the Gissar Range, the Zarafshan Range, the Turkestan Range, and the Alay Range. Collectively the southern chain has been referred to as the Pamir-Alay. In between the two mountain chains is the Fergana Valley. To the east are the Pamir Mountains. The snow line is lowest in the west (3,400 metres (11,200 ft), and highest in the east (4,540 metres (14,900 ft)).

The higher elevations in the Pamir-Alay are in the Pamir alpine desert and tundra ecoregion, and heavily glaciated. To the west, and at lower elevations, is the Alai-Western Tian Shan steppe ecoregion.

== Climate ==
The climate of the ecoregion is Humid continental climate - Hot, dry summer sub-type (Köppen climate classification Dsa), with large seasonal temperature differentials and a hot summer (at least one month averaging over 22 °C (72 °F), and mild winters. The driest month between April and September does not have more than 30 millimeters of precipitation.

== Flora and fauna ==
Flora communities reflect altitude zones. Below 1800-2000 meters the desert foothills are characterized by sagebrush (Artemisia), bulbous bluegrass (Poa bulbosa), and sedges (Carex pachystilis). At higher elevations are meadows and grasslands dominated by fescues (Festuca alaica). Junipers (Juniperus seravschanica, Juniperus turkestanica, and J. semiglobosa), Platanus orientalis (Plane Tree), wild fruit trees (cherry, pears, apples) and nut trees (almonds, pistachios) grow along with steppe grasses and shrubs of Cotoneaster, rose, and honeysuckle (Lonicera).

== Protections ==
Significant protected areas in the ecoregion include:

- Sayram-Ugam National Park
- Köýtendag Nature Reserve
- Zaamin National Park
- Ramit State Nature Reserve
