= Forest, Wildlife & Environment Department, Gilgit-Baltistan =

Provincial department in Pakistan

Forest, Wildlife & Environment Department
- محکمہ جنگلات، جنگلی حیات و ماحولیات گلگت بلتستان

Agency overview
- Formed: 2010
- Jurisdiction: Government of Gilgit-Baltistan
- Headquarters: Gilgit, Gilgit–Baltistan
- Agency executive: Secretary Forest, Wildlife & Environment (GB)
- Parent department: Government of Gilgit–Baltistan
- Website: fwegb.gov.pk

The Forest, Wildlife & Environment Department (FW&ED) is the provincial department of the Government of Gilgit-Baltistan (GB) responsible for forestry, wildlife and environmental management across the territory. Formed following administrative reforms in 2010, it oversees forests, protected areas, environmental regulation and conservation programmes through attached organisations including the Parks & Wildlife wing and the Environmental Protection Agency (EPA).

== Legal framework and mandate ==
The department's functions are defined in the provincial rules of business and environmental policy instruments, and are independently described by the IUCN in its member profile for the GB government department. In 2024, the Draft Gilgit–Baltistan Environment Policy outlined governance, planning integration and capacity-building measures for environmental protection and climate resilience in the region, providing context for departmental roles and EPA responsibilities.

== Structure ==
FW&ED is headquartered in Gilgit and operates through divisional and district offices for forests, parks & wildlife, and the EPA. Official pages list leadership roles, attached organisations and contact points for service delivery and enforcement.

== Protected areas ==
The department administers several large high-mountain protected areas, including Khunjerab National Park, Deosai National Park, Central Karakoram National Park, Himalaya National Park (Gilgit–Baltistan), Nanga Parbat National Park, Qurumbar National Park and Handarap–Shandur National Park. Official maps and listings are published by the department, while the federal Press Information Department announced the establishment of Himalaya and Nanga Parbat national parks in December 2020 under Pakistan's Protected Areas Initiative.

== Programmes and activities ==
=== Community-based trophy hunting ===
Independent reporting documents the department-run community trophy hunting programme for species such as Astore markhor, Himalayan ibex and blue sheep, with record bids reported in 2025. Coverage notes that most revenues are returned to local community conservancies, linking livelihoods with wildlife protection.

=== Eco-tourism and outreach ===
In June 2024, IUCN Pakistan announced the unveiling of two new eco-tourism sites in Gilgit–Baltistan as part of a conservation-compatible tourism initiative in the northern areas. The department also reports public-awareness efforts, including interpretive billboards and site signage at key locations.

=== Research and monitoring ===
Biodiversity surveys and inventories carried out in the GB parks network include a recent inventory of medium- to large-sized mammals in Central Karakoram National Park, published in a peer-reviewed open-access journal and conducted with departmental oversight and permits. The department is also referenced in IUCN's 2025 Save Our Species project to recover the Ladakh urial in Gilgit–Baltistan.

=== Reforestation and climate resilience ===
Community-led reforestation and landscape restoration initiatives have been reported from Gilgit–Baltistan, describing livelihood benefits and risk reduction in flood-prone valleys; these efforts complement the department's restoration and climate-resilience programmes.

== Recognition and awards ==
GB departmental staff have received national conservation honours. In 2024–2025, Pakistan Wildlife Protection Awards recognised multiple GB officials, with categories including the Snow Leopard Award, Ibex Award and Blue Sheep Award, highlighted by national media coverage.

== See also ==
- Government of Gilgit-Baltistan
- Protected areas of Pakistan
- National parks of Pakistan
