= Northwestern Himalayan alpine shrub and meadows =

Ecoregion in the Northwestern Himalayas

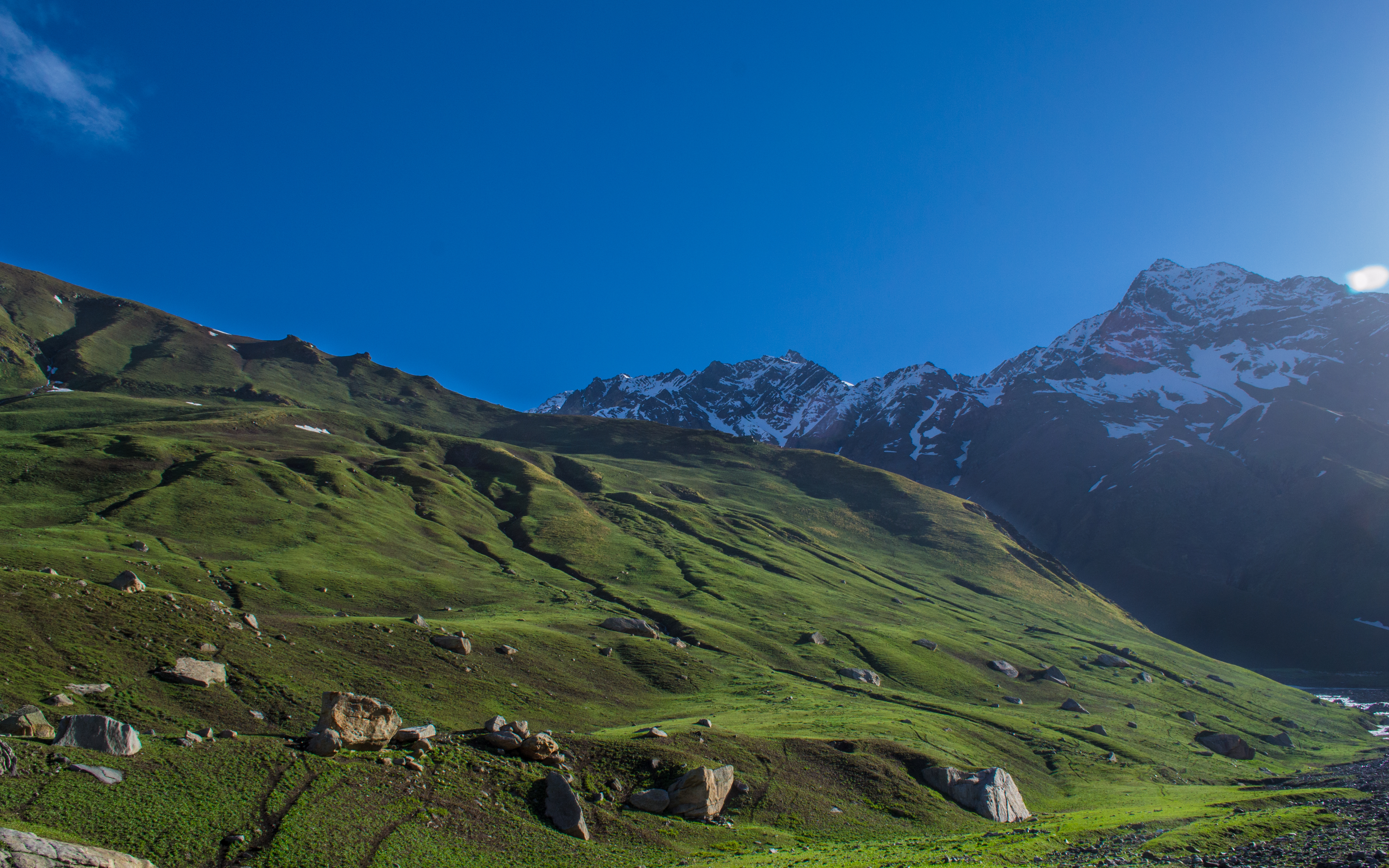
- Pin Valley National Park

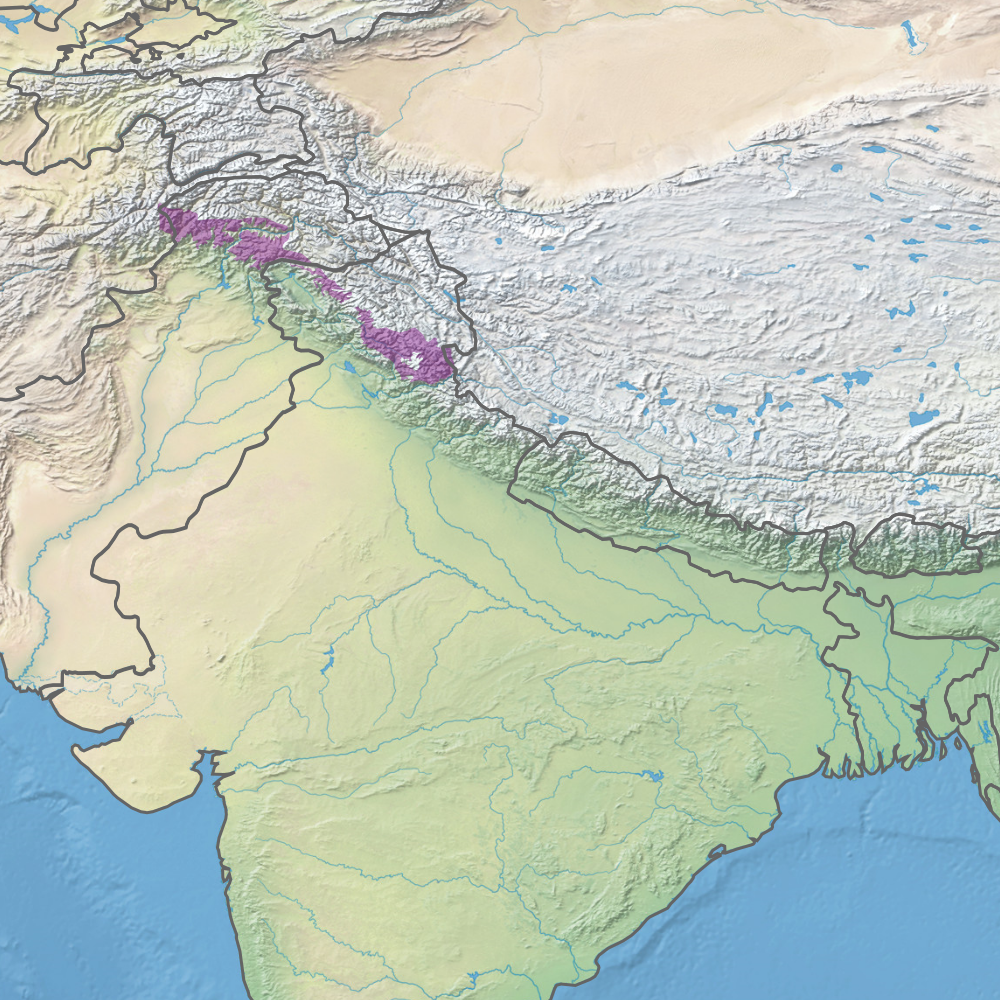
- Ecoregion territory (in purple)

Ecology
- Biome: Montane grasslands and shrublands
- Borders: List: Karakoram-West Tibetan Plateau alpine steppe; Western Himalayan alpine shrub and meadows; Western Himalayan subalpine conifer forests; Western Himalayan broadleaf forests; Himalayan subtropical pine forests; Baluchistan xeric woodlands; Hindu Kush alpine meadow
- Bird species: 172
- Mammal species: 80

Geography
- Area: 49,400 km^{2} (19,100 mi^{2})
- Countries: India; China; Pakistan; Afghanistan

Conservation
- Habitat loss: 20.896%
- Protected: 9.24%

The Northwestern Himalayan alpine shrub and meadows is a montane grasslands and shrublands ecoregion of the elevations of the northwestern Himalaya of China, India, and Pakistan. As well as parts of the Hindu Kush range.

== Setting ==
Northwestern Himalayan alpine shrub and meadows cover 49,400 square kilometres (19,100 mi^{2}) at elevations between 3,300 and 3,600 metres (10,800 and 11,800 ft) in the northwestern Himalayas. They are found in Himachal Pradesh and Jammu and Kashmir in northwestern India and in Khyber Pakhtunkhwa, Azad Kashmir and Gilgit Baltistan in northern Pakistan.

== Flora ==
This ecoregion's flora is composed mostly of krummholz and herbaceous plants.

Various rhododendrons live in the scrub habitat near timberline, as do junipers and birches. Although several species of rhododendron are recorded in this ecoregion, they are represented by a lesser greater diversity than in the eastern Himalaya, where 60 species are reported in the Northeastern Himalayan subalpine conifer forests.

Genera of herbaceous plants include Doronicum, Delphinium, Gentiana, Meconopsis, Pedicularis, Anemone, Aster, Polygonum, Primula, and Mertensia. Scree habitats include Caragana, Saxifraga, Draba, and Gypsophila.

== Fauna ==
Eighty mammals species are reported in this ecoregion. It contains prime habitat for the snow leopard and the Tibetan wolf. Other mammals include the ibex, markhor, blue sheep, tahr, and Himalayan marmot.

There are 172 bird species in this ecoregion. Important birds include the lammergeier, golden eagle, Himalayan griffon vulture, snow partridge, Tibetan snowcock, and Himalayan snowcock.

== Conservation ==
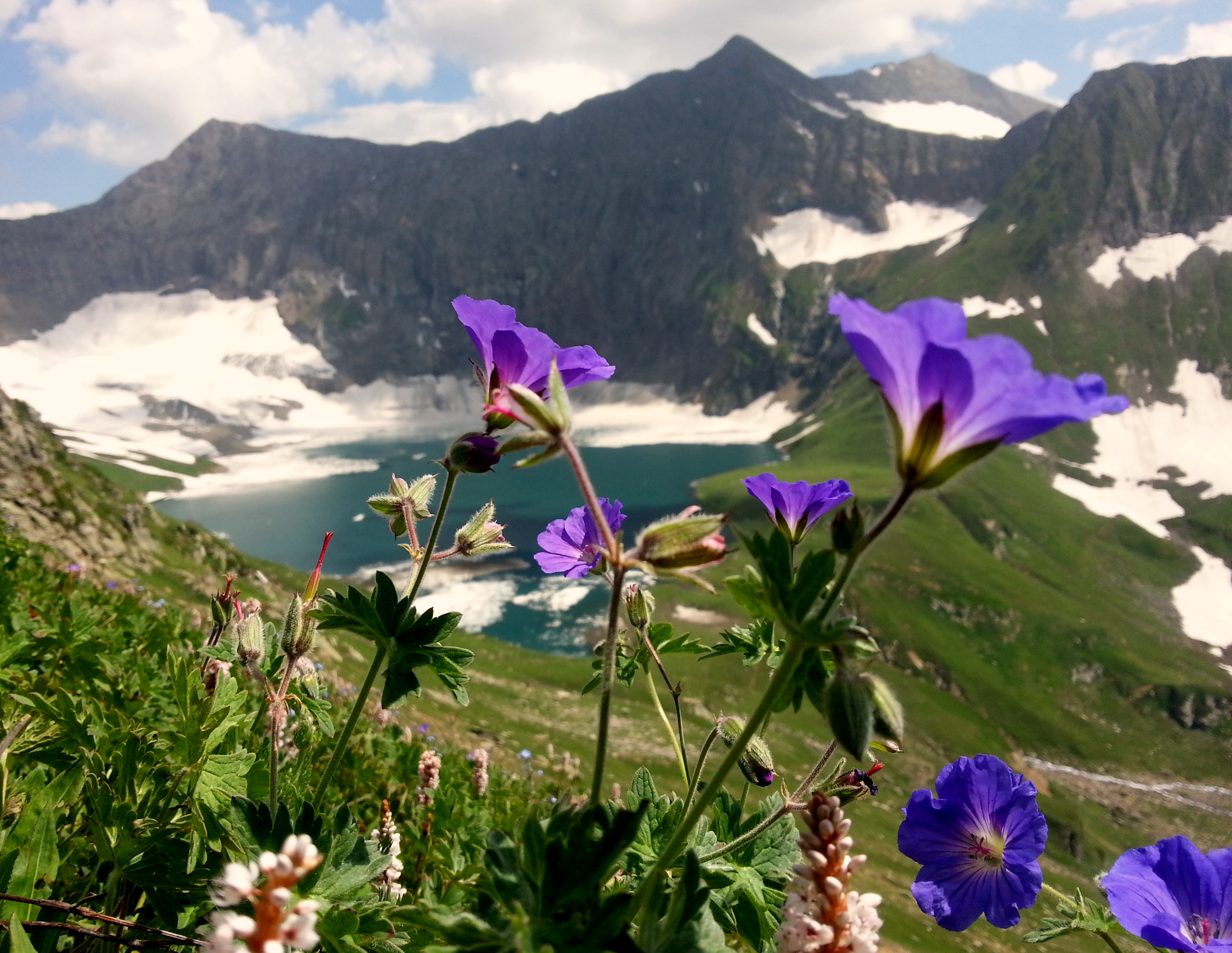
Ratti Gali Lake, Azad Kashmir

This ecoregion is well preserved because of high elevation, difficult climate, and lack of trees. Protected areas include:

- Pin Valley National Park
- Great Himalayan National Park
- Fairy Meadows
- Kishtwar National Park
- Lulusar-Dudipatsar National Park
- Saiful Muluk National Park

== See also ==
- List of ecoregions in India
