= Panmah Glacier =

Glacier in Pakistan

- Location within Karakoram Location within Gilgit Baltistan Location within Pakistan
- Interactive map of Panmah Glacier
- Location: Gilgit-Baltistan, Pakistan
- Coordinates: 35°54′N 76°00′E

Panmah Glacier is a glacier in Gilgit-Baltistan, Pakistan. It is included in the Central Karakoram National Park.

== See also ==
- Central Karakoram National Park
- List of glaciers
- Panmah Muztagh
