= Sayram-Ugam National Park =

National park in Kazakhstan

- Sairam-Ugam
- IUCN category II (national park)
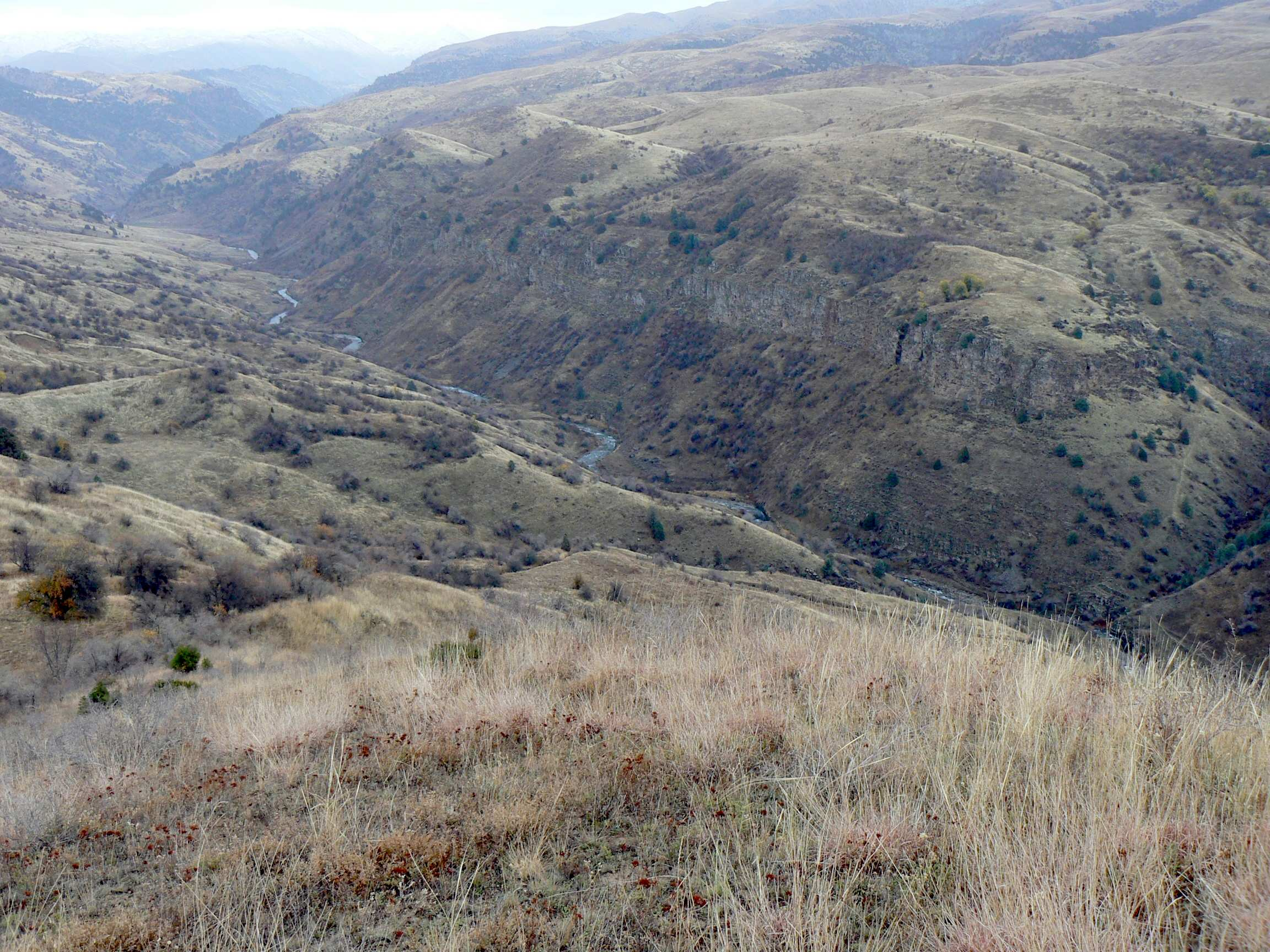
- Ugam River

- Location within Kazakhstan
- Location: Turkistan Region, Kazakhstan
- Nearest city: Shymkent
- Coordinates: 41°57′N 70°03′E
- Area: 149,037.1 hectares (368,279 acres; 1,490 km^{2}; 575 sq mi)
- Established: 26 January 2006
- Visitors: 68,350 (in 2022)
- Governing body: Committee of Forestry and Wildlife, Ministry of Ecology and Natural Resources of Kazakhstan
- World Heritage site: 2016 (part of Western Tien-Shan)
- Website: http://www.sugnpp.kz/

Sayram-Ugam National Park (Kazakh: Сайрам-Өгем ұлттық паркі, Sairam-Ögem ūlttyq parkı), also Sairam-Ugam, is a mountainous region of the Western Tian Shan Mountains, on the border with Uzbekistan. Ugam-Chatkal National Park of Uzbekistan is across the border, and Aksu-Zhabagly Nature Reserve of Kazakhstan is directly to the northeast along the border. The area has high levels of species diversity, covering floral communities from steppe to high altitude zones. It is particularly known for stands of juniper forests, and stands of fruit and nut trees. Sayram-Ugam is located in Kazygurt District, Tole Bi District and Tulkibas District of Turkistan Region (South Kazakhstan Region until 2018). The park boundary is 30 kilometres (19 mi) southeast of the city of Shymkent, and 50 km northeast of the Uzbek capital of Tashkent.

The park was established on 26 January 2006 by a decree of the Government of Kazakhstan that merged three state forest and wildlife protection institutions; according to its administration, it was the first national park in the region. It covers 149,037.1 ha (1,490 km^{2}; 575 sq mi), making it the largest national park in Turkistan Region. Since 2016, three sections of the park have formed part of the transboundary World Heritage Site Western Tien-Shan. In 2021 and 2023 the World Heritage Committee expressed extreme concern over the removal of a large part of the park from the property into its buffer zone, and the IUCN lists hydropower and tourism infrastructure, including a planned cascade of hydroelectric plants on the Ugam River and the Kaskasu ski resort, among the main threats to the site.

== History ==
Before the park was created, its forests were managed by three institutions of the regional natural resources department: the Ugam, Tolebi and Tulkibas state institutions for the protection of forests and wildlife. According to the park administration, these institutions operated as production units and paid little attention to conservation: livestock grazing exceeded permitted levels, and populations of species listed in the Red Book of Kazakhstan were declining, mainly because of poaching.

Land for the future park was reserved by resolution No. 365 of the regional governor (akim) of 8 June 2005. The land-use plan provided for a park of 149,053 ha (368,320 acres) on forest fund and reserve lands of Tulkibas, Tolebi and Kazygurt districts.

Government decree No. 52 of 26 January 2006 transferred the three institutions to national ownership and merged them into the state institution "Sayram-Ugam State National Nature Park", subordinate to the Committee of Forestry and Hunting of the Ministry of Agriculture. The same decree granted the park permanent use of 11,100 ha (27,000 acres) of reserve pasture land in Kazygurt and Tolebi districts. In total 149,053 ha (368,320 acres) were assigned to the park: 76,573 ha in Kazygurt District, 45,509 ha in Tolebi District and 26,971 ha in Tulkibas District. The decree classified the park's forests as "forests of state national nature parks" and instructed the regional administration to establish a protection zone around the park. The protection zone was set up by resolution No. 171 of the regional administration of 26 April 2006. Its land was not withdrawn from existing users and remains pasture and farmland, but activities that fundamentally disturb the natural state of the area are prohibited there.

Passports for the park's tourist routes were approved by order No. 93 of the Committee of Forestry and Hunting of 1 April 2008. The first volume of the park's Scientific Proceedings was published in 2012. The park is now administered by the Committee of Forestry and Wildlife of the Ministry of Ecology and Natural Resources. It marked its 20th anniversary in January 2026.

== Geography ==
=== Topography ===
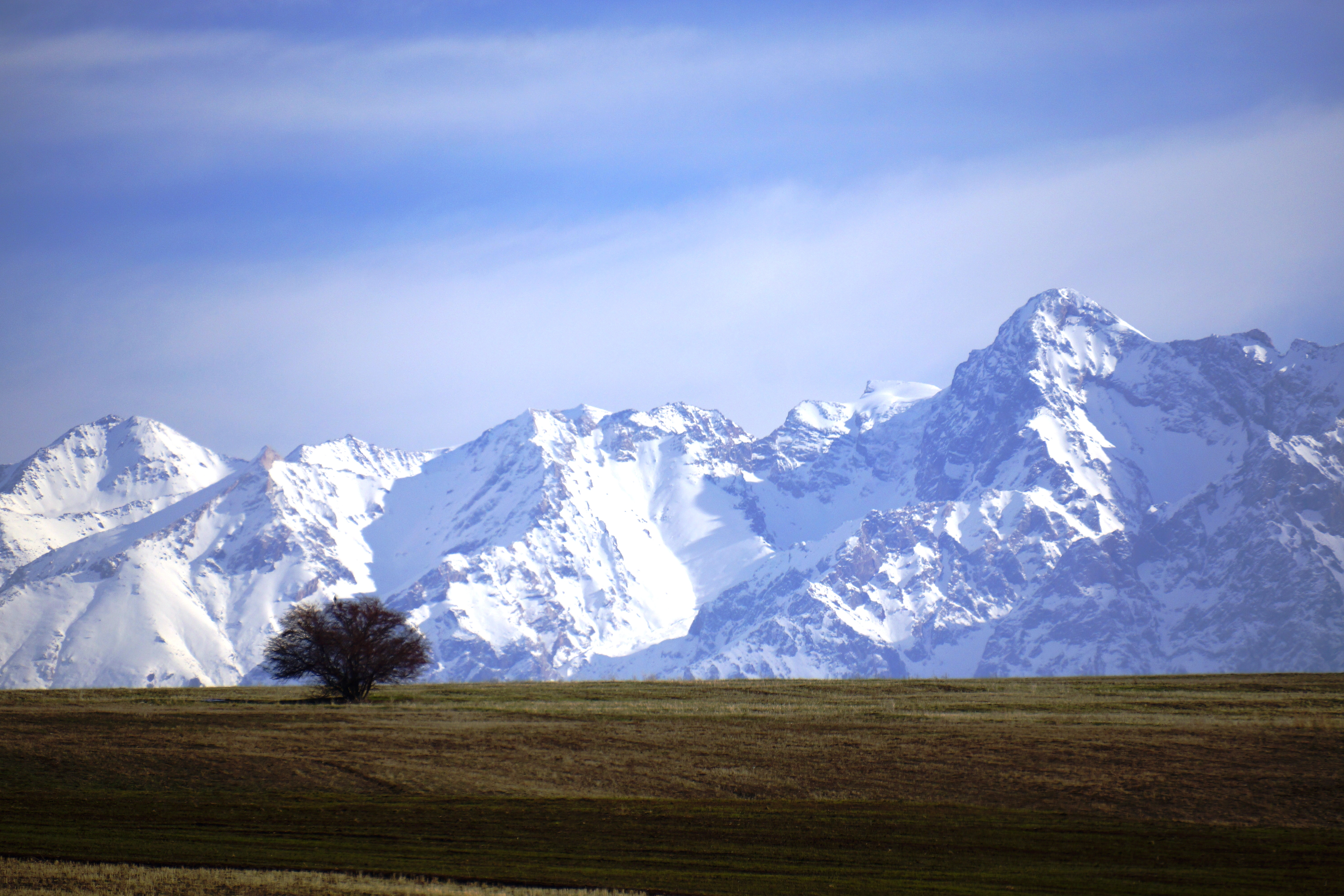
Sairam Peak, the highest point of the park

Sayram-Ugam is situated on the northern slopes and spurs of the Western Tian Shan Mountains, including the Ugam Range, the Karatau Mountains, Boraldaytau and Talas Alatau. The name draws on the nearby historic town of Sayram, and the Ugam Range.

In more detail, the park includes the Boraldaytau mountains (southern spurs of the Syr Darya Karatau), the Mashattau mountains (spurs of the Talas Alatau), the Kazygurt mountains (spurs of the Karzhantau), and the Karzhantau and Ugam ranges. The highest point is Sairam Peak, 4,238 metres (13,904 ft) high according to most sources (4,236 metres (13,898 ft) according to the park). A mountaineering route leads to Vladislav Peak (3,632 metres (11,916 ft)) via Snezhny Pass (3,350 metres (10,990 ft)).

=== Sections ===
The park consists of three separate sections stretching from north to south over a total distance of 135 kilometres (84 mi):

- Boraldaytau section – borders Jambyl Region to the north; its eastern, western and southern boundaries follow the boundaries of the Kaiyrshokty, Kanai and Kokbulak forest gardens.
- Irsu-Daubaba section – its northern boundary follows the watershed between the Daubaba and Mashat river basins, its western boundary the road from Seslavino to the Aksai winter camp, and its eastern boundary the Tulkibas–Raevka road; the southern boundary runs along the canyon of the Mashat River and includes the canyon itself. The Mashat canyon belongs to the park's Tulkibas branch.
- Sairam-Ugam section – borders the Aksu-Zhabagly Nature Reserve to the north and the state border to the east and southeast; to the west it is bounded by the slopes of the Karzhantau and the north-western part of the Ugam Range.

Administratively, the park is divided into three branches: Ugam (76,573 ha (189,220 acres)), Tolebi (45,493.1 ha (112,416 acres)) and Tulkibas (26,971 ha (66,650 acres)).

=== Rivers and lakes ===
Rivers crossing the park include the Ugam, Kaskasu, Sairamsu, Burguluk, Kokbulak, Badam and Mashat. Its mountain lakes include Makpal, at an elevation of 2,100 metres (6,900 ft), Susyngen, at 1,700 metres (5,600 ft), and a lake in the Sairamsu gorge.

== Ecoregion ==
The park is in the Gissaro-Alai open woodlands ecoregion (WWF #0808), which covers the mountainous area at the meeting points of southern Kazakhstan, western Kyrgyzstan, Tajikistan, and Uzbekistan, in the Panir and Tian Shen mountain ranges. The ecoregion is known for a climate favorable for fruit and nut trees, such as walnut, pistachio, pears, almonds, apples and cherries.

== Climate ==
The climate in the Sayram-Ugam region is "Cold, Semi-Arid Climate" (Koeppen Classification BSk). This climate is characteristic of steppe climates intermediary between desert and humid climates. Typically, precipitation is just above evapotranspiration. In the Sayram-Ugam region, Temperatures can range from an average of −1.9 °C (28.6 °F) in January to 25.9 °C (78.6 °F) in July. Average precipitation is 362 mm per year, with variations due to altitude and location.

== Plants and animals ==
The park has seven natural altitude zones, ranging from mountain steppe to alpine and glaciated peaks. Approximately one-third of the park is forested, including sparse forests of juniper. The non-forest land includes rocky peaks and over 11 km2 of glaciers. The area is known for having many wild varieties of well-known cultivated fruit and nut trees: apple, pear, walnut, plum, and grape. Scientists have recorded 1,635 species of plants in the park, 35 of which are endemic. Of the 59 known mammal species in the park, 22 are rodents, including the house mouse, the wood mouse, and the Turkestan rat. Predators include fox, wolf and jackal. Mountain goats, wild boar, and roe deer are present, but hunting in the past has reduced their presence on some ranges.

Entomologists distinguish desert and semi-desert, shrub and savanna-like belts, mountain floodplain forests, a belt of shibljak woodland, and juniper-meadow, subalpine and alpine belts in the park. According to the park administration, forest-covered land makes up 18.5% of its territory.

=== Flora ===
Zeravshan juniper

According to the park, 62 of its 1,635 plant species are listed in the Red Book of Kazakhstan, although some publications give a figure of 240. Protected plants of the park include Greig's tulip (Tulipa greigii) and Kaufmann's tulip (Tulipa kaufmanniana), the wild apples Malus sieversii and Malus niedzwetzkyana, the Caucasian hackberry (Celtis caucasica), the Karatau onion (Allium karataviense), Korolkov's arum (Arum korolkowii), the Zeravshan juniper (Juniperus seravschanica), the Pskem onion (Allium pskemense) and Janczewski's currant (Ribes janczewskii). Iris albertii and Sogdian ash (Fraxinus sogdiana) also grow in the park, alongside wild grape, walnut, plum and pear. The Zeravshan juniper is widespread in the juniper-meadow belt of the Ugam Range, and closed juniper forests survive in the valleys of the Sairamsu and Ugam rivers.

The botanist A. A. Ivashchenko has published a study of little-known endemics of the Western Tian Shan in the park's flora. According to data from the three States Parties cited by the IUCN, the area covered by Malus sieversii in the park grew from 25 ha (62 acres) in 2016 to 55 ha (140 acres) in 2023 thanks to planting in the ecological stabilization zone.

=== Fauna ===
Ten of the park's 59 mammal species are listed in the Red Book of Kazakhstan: Menzbier's marmot, the desert long-eared bat (Otonycteris leucophaea), the European free-tailed bat, the Tian Shan brown bear, the beech marten, the marbled polecat, the snow leopard, the Turkestan lynx, the Karatau argali and the Indian crested porcupine. Of about 300 bird species, 30 are listed in the Red Book, including the golden eagle, white stork, ferruginous duck, short-toed snake eagle, saker falcon, peregrine falcon, great bustard, little bustard, yellow-eyed pigeon, Eurasian eagle-owl and blue whistling thrush.

Menzbier's marmot, an endemic of the Western Tian Shan, lives in the park in the basins of the Badam, Ugam, Kaskasu and Sairamsu rivers; the park administration describes this population as unique. Monitoring data cited by the IUCN show its numbers in the park falling from 13,845 animals in 2016 to 12,293 in 2023, making it the only key species of the World Heritage property with a negative trend. When the property was nominated, the IUCN noted that the most important habitat of this species had been left outside it: an enclave inside the park that does not belong to the park and is used as pasture.

Snow leopards in the park are recorded by camera traps; the Committee of Forestry and Wildlife reported such images, for example, in July 2022. In September 2025 the Ministry of Ecology stated that, according to monitoring, the numbers of snow leopard, Tian Shan brown bear and Karatau argali in the park were increasing, and attributed this to the forest guards' work against poaching.

In 2021 the ichthyologist V. G. Sideleva described a fish species new to science, the sculpin Cottus nudus; its holotype was caught in the Mashat River, a tributary of the Arys, near the village of Kershetas.

Among invertebrates, jewel beetles have been studied in particular: collections made in 2012–2014 and museum material revealed 36 species and subspecies from 15 genera in the park.

== Management and zoning ==
The park is officially divided into four zones: a strictly protected zone of 55,589.4 ha (137,364 acres) (37.3%), a zone of limited economic activity of 60,628 ha (149,820 acres) (40.7%), a zone for recreational and tourist activities of 19,711 ha (48,710 acres) (13.2%), and an area of environmental stabilization of 13,124.6 ha (32,432 acres) (8.8%).

Entry to the park is subject to a fee. Prohibited activities include lighting fires and pitching tents outside designated sites, unauthorised grazing, haymaking and logging, and collecting plants outside permitted areas.

== Archaeology ==
Since 2012 the monuments of the Ugam valley have been studied by the South Kazakhstan archaeological expedition led by Professor Alexander Podushkin. In 2016, during excavations at the Ushbastobe settlement, archaeologists uncovered a citadel – a fortress with steep slopes and ditches around its perimeter, standing near the Kokbel canyon. Finds included ceramic vessels of various shapes, a metal sickle and a millstone. Podushkin attributes the settlement to the era of the Kangju state (2nd century BC – 4th century AD) and believes that Ushbastobe, together with the neighbouring settlements of Zhanteketobe, Taskoratobe and Kobelektobe, was a major economic centre of that state.

== World Heritage status ==
In 2016, at the 40th session of the World Heritage Committee in Istanbul, the transboundary property Western Tien-Shan in Kazakhstan, Kyrgyzstan and Uzbekistan was inscribed on the World Heritage List under criterion (x). Its Kazakh part consists of the Aksu-Zhabagly and Karatau nature reserves and Sayram-Ugam National Park. The property comprises 13 components from seven protected areas; the park is represented by three of them – the Boraldaytau, Irsu-Daubaba and Sairam-Ugam sections. The IUCN had recommended deferring the nomination, but the Committee decided to inscribe it. Among other things, the IUCN objected to an additional proposal to exclude about 80,339 ha (198,520 acres) of the tourism and recreation zone and the zone of limited economic activity from the Sairam-Ugam component.

In 2018 Kazakhstan reported a revision of the boundaries of the Sairam-Ugam component, under which the park's zone of limited economic activity (about 60,628 ha or 149,820 acres) would be moved into the property's buffer zone. The Committee expressed concern that this would exclude a significant area from the property, recalled that boundary changes are acceptable only if they strengthen protection, and called on the three countries to prepare a joint proposal on the boundaries.

At its extended 44th session in 2021, the Committee noted "with extreme concern" the exclusion of a significant part of Sayram-Ugam National Park from the property and its inclusion in the buffer zone, and requested that a joint World Heritage Centre/IUCN reactive monitoring mission be invited. At the 45th session in Riyadh in 2023 the Committee repeated this assessment and recalled that the removal of legal protection from part of a property may constitute a potential danger to it under the Operational Guidelines. According to the World Heritage Centre, more than 60,000 ha (150,000 acres) had been removed from the property. The joint state of conservation report of 2024 contains updated information on the protection status of the three components in the park and refers to technical errors made at the time of inscription. Kazakhstan has also reported plans to expand the park by 10,000 ha (25,000 acres) of land currently under the regional administration.

A joint reactive monitoring mission of the World Heritage Centre and the IUCN visited the property in 2024. In decision 47 COM 7B.8 (2025), the Committee took note of its recommendations and acknowledged the progress made by the three States Parties in joint management of the property, including the adoption of a Regional Management Plan for 2024–2028. It asked the States Parties to finalise the boundary clarification and the Statement of Outstanding Universal Value, and welcomed Kazakhstan's proposal to include the critical habitat of Menzbier's marmot in Sayram-Ugam National Park in the property. For planned projects, including the Kaskasu ski resort, it stressed the need for impact assessments. On the Ugam hydropower project, it stated that if the project is pursued further, it should follow the mission's recommendation to minimise environmental impact, including by prioritising water abstraction for domestic use over electricity generation, and that any decision on implementation must not harm the property's Outstanding Universal Value. The States Parties were asked to submit an updated joint report by 1 December 2026 for the Committee's 49th session.

In the IUCN World Heritage Outlook 2025, the conservation outlook for Western Tien-Shan is rated "significant concern". The IUCN lists hydropower, tourism infrastructure, mining and climate change among the main threats.

== Conservation issues ==
The IUCN identifies poaching, fires in dry years (particularly dangerous for juniper woodlands in inaccessible terrain), livestock grazing and possible growth in recreational pressure as threats to the Kazakh components of the property.

The most prominent issue is a project for a group water pipeline with a cascade of hydroelectric plants on the Ugam River. Kazakhstan submitted a heritage impact assessment for the project to the World Heritage Centre and the IUCN in September 2024. On 11 March 2025 the Ministry of Water Resources and Irrigation signed an investment agreement with South Hydro Power LLP; according to the feasibility study the project costs 190 billion tenge, with a design capacity of 110 million m^{3} of drinking water per year and 72 MW of electricity. In January 2026 the Minister of Water Resources, Nurzhan Nurzhigitov, said that design documentation would be prepared during the year under a public–private partnership; the pipeline is intended to supply water to more than one million residents of the Kazygurt, Saryagash, Keles, Zhetysai and Maktaaral districts. The IUCN considers that the impact assessment lacks complete data on key species and that building hydropower and water-abstraction infrastructure within the property is incompatible with the aims of the World Heritage Convention. Downstream of the park, a small hydropower plant on the lower Ugam in Uzbekistan was completed at the end of 2024; according to the IUCN it may obstruct fish migration.

The second contested project is the Kaskasu ski resort in the gorge of the same name. In the late 2010s the Turkestan social-entrepreneurial corporation announced construction of a complex covering 360 ha (890 acres) within the park, with slopes at elevations of 1,750–3,200 metres (5,740–10,500 ft). According to the IUCN, the project, covering 280 ha (690 acres), is proposed in the component's buffer zone but appears from the map to extend into its core; national authorities have suspended discussion of it pending an impact assessment. In 2026 the Turkistan regional administration again presented a concept for the resort. Official cost estimates from 2025–2026 vary from 46 billion to about 172 billion tenge.

== Tourism ==
The Kyrykkyz rocks

Though much of the area is protected for nature conservation, there are 10 tourist routes in the park. The routes support hiking, horseback, and on some lengths, buses. Hiking trails range from 7 to 72 km. Facilities include campsites, hiking trails, viewing platforms, baths and saunas, yurts to let (without services), a hotel, and access to guides and translators. The park now reports 11 tourist routes; its description also mentions 10 routes (four horse-and-foot, five foot and one horse route) with a total length of 604 kilometres (375 mi), including 187 kilometres (116 mi) on foot, 231 kilometres (144 mi) on horseback and 186 kilometres (116 mi) by vehicle.

The park's attractions include Sairam Peak, the Kyrykkyz rocks (Kazakh for "forty girls"), Lake Makpal, the high-mountain Lake Susyngen (whose name means "the water has gone into the ground"), rock carvings in the upper part of the Sazanata river gorge, and fields of Greig's tulip. The Kyrykkyz rocks are small pointed outcrops that from a distance resemble girls in a round dance; according to local accounts there were once forty of them, and about twenty remain. A local legend says that forty girls turned to stone while fleeing a cruel khan. Popular routes lead to the Nautsai and Burguluk gorges, the Sairamsu valley and Lake Susyngen, and a seasonal 7-kilometre (4.3 mi) "Bird Market" route is laid out for birdwatchers. A 12-kilometre (7.5 mi) route leads to the Sazanata petroglyphs.

In June 2023 an upgraded route, Sairamsu anyzdary ("Legends of Sairamsu"), about 16 kilometres (9.9 mi) long there and back, was opened with the support of the United Nations Development Programme; it has an entrance group, viewing platforms, art objects, signposts and biodiversity information boards made of local natural materials. At the same time UNDP launched a virtual tour of the park. The park received 68,350 visitors in 2022 and 64,500 between the start of 2023 and the end of June.

Petroglyphs, places of worship, settlements and burials of various periods have been found in the park but remain little studied; according to Tengrinews, one of the routes of the Silk Road passed through the area.

== Gallery ==
Lake Makpal

Lake Susyngen

Ugam River

Ugam Range

Saryaigyr gorge

Willow grove on the Sairamsu River

Park territory in Tulkibas District

Flowering barberry
