= Central Karakoram National Park =

National Park in Pakistan

- میانی قراقرم ملی باغ
- IUCN category II (national park)
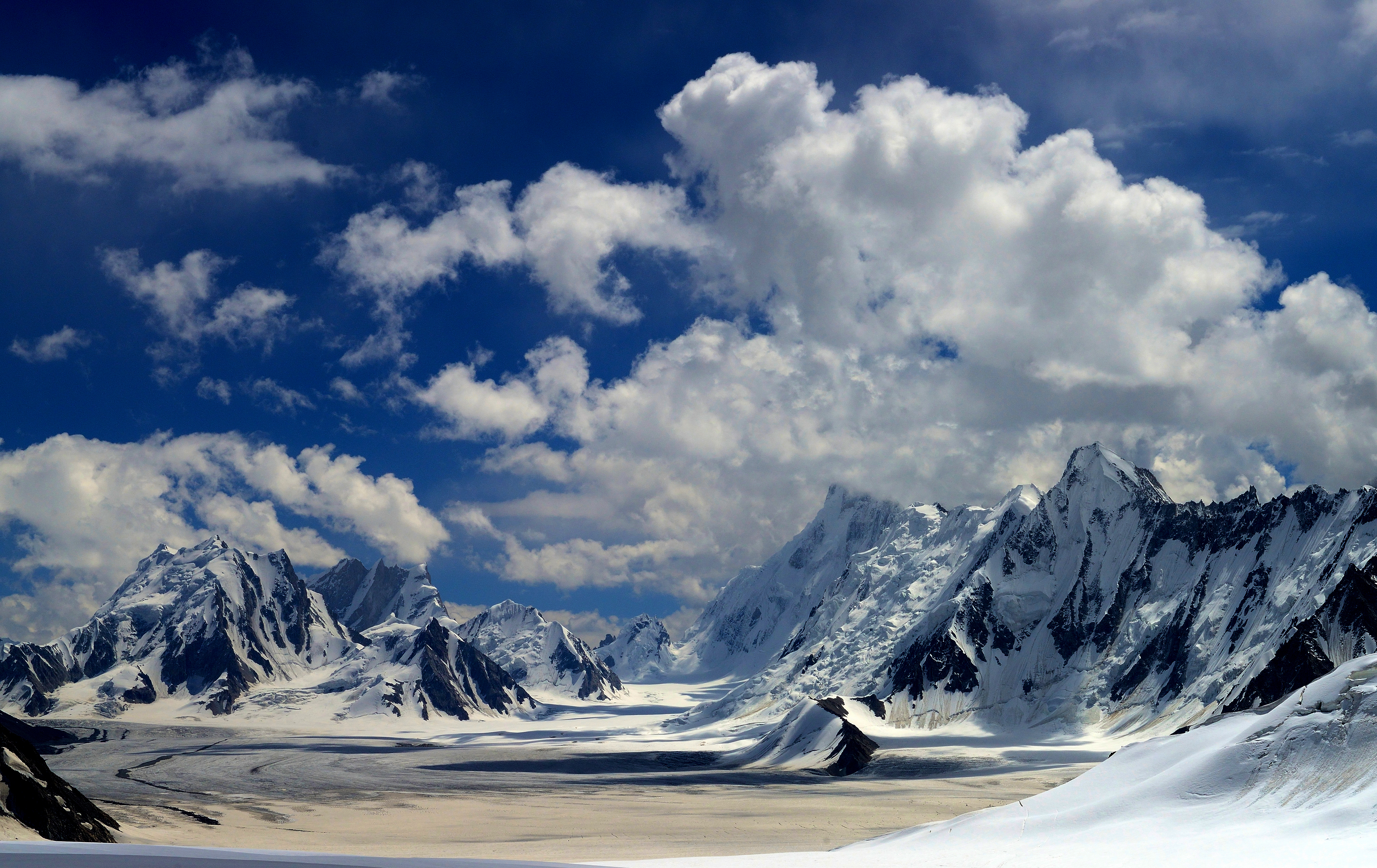
- Location: Gilgit-Baltistan, Pakistan
- Nearest city: Skardu
- Established: 1993

Central Karakoram National Park (Urdu: میانی قراقرم ملی باغ) is a national park located in Skardu district of Gilgit-Baltistan in Pakistan. It encompasses some of the world’s highest peaks and largest glaciers. Internationally renowned for mountaineering, rock climbing and trekking opportunities, it covers an area of about 10,000 sq. km and contains the greatest concentration of some of the tallest mountains on Earth. It has four peaks over 8,000 m including K2 (8611 m), Gasherbrum-I (8068 m), Gasherbrum-II (8035 m) and Broad Peak (8051 m), and sixty peaks higher than 7,000 m. The park was placed on the World Heritage Site Tentative List in 2016.

== Features ==
The Central Karakoram National Park is the highest national park in the world and the largest protected area in Pakistan. It covers about 10,557 km^{2} (4,100 mi^{2}) in the Central Karakoram mountain range. It varies in altitude from 2,000 m (6,562 ft) above sea level to the summit of Chogori K2, the world's second highest mountain at 8,611 m (28,251 ft). There are three other mountains over 8,000 m (26,247 ft), Gasherbrum I (8,068 m (26,470 ft)), Gasherbrum II (8,035 m (26,362 ft)) and phalchanri Broad Peak (8,051 m (26,414 ft)), and sixty mountains over 7,000 m (23,000 ft). The park also includes the Baltoro, Panmah, Biafo and Hispar glaciers and their tributary glaciers and is considered to be one of the most beautiful national parks in Pakistan. In 2013 it was stated that the exact boundaries of the park were unclear because, twenty years after its formation, the park still lacked a management plan. At the time of its creation in 1993, four coordinates were provided to delineate the boundaries of the park. The International Union for Conservation of Nature put forward a proposed management plan in 1994, but that was not approved at the time. A management plan should cover all aspects of the park including such things as forestry, mining, other natural resources, tourism, grazing land and waste management, and without an appropriate plan, the park could not be properly administered.

In February 2015, a management plan for the park was finally established, following a year-long consultation period with stakeholders and local communities. The plan covers ten sectors: wildlife, vegetation, aromatic/medicinal plants and non-wood forest products, pastures and livestock, agriculture, mining, water, tourism, local communities involvement and research. The park is divided into two zones; the core zone, occupying about 7,600 km^{2} (2,900 mi^{2}), comprises the mountain peaks, glaciers and high level mountain areas, and their fragile ecosystem; the buffer zone comprises around 3,000 km^{2} (1,200 mi^{2}) of mainly lower-lying areas around human settlements where unsustainable activities take place, and corridors providing access to different parts of the core zone.

A study of the size of the glaciers in the park, made using Landsat images over the decade 2001 to 2010, shows that the ice cover is substantially unchanged. This demonstrates the fact that the Karakoram region is bucking the trend for glaciers to retreat that is happening elsewhere; this is known as the "Karakoram anomaly".

== Ecological zones ==
The park has several distinct ecological zones, each with its own natural vegetation which is closely related to the climate and topography; in general, the area has low precipitation and experiences humid westerly winds. The villages are in the valley bottoms where wheat, maize and potatoes are grown, and pomegranate and apricot trees thrive. The lower slopes consist of "alpine dry steppes". They have gravel and moraine soils and support sparse grass and scrub. The "sub-alpine scrub zone" is found beside rivers and streams, in gullies and ravines. It consists of bushes and small deciduous trees and provides browsing for livestock and wild ungulates. Higher up there is the "alpine meadows and alpine scrub zone" which has high pasture and open coniferous forest and is only available for grazing in summer. Above this are permanent snowfields and cold desert areas which occupy the 4,200 to 5,100 m (13,780 to 16,732 ft) zone, and here there are isolated patches of stunted grass and hardy, low vegetation.

== Flora and fauna ==
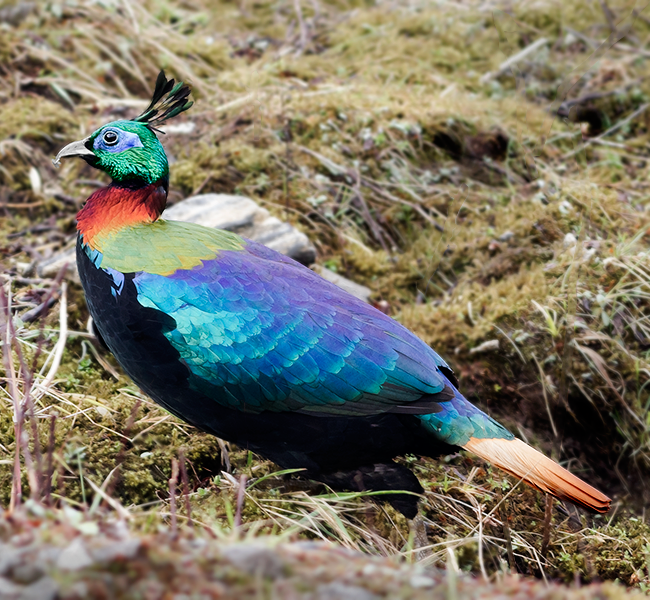
Himalayan monal

Some valleys are dominated by communities of West Himalayan spruce, Himalayan white pine and Pashtun juniper, including some pure stands of P. smithiana. Smaller shrubs and plants associated with these communities include sea wormwood, Astragalus gilgitensis, Fragaria nubicola, Geranium nepalensis, Kashmir balsam, Thymus linearis, white clover, Rubus irritans, Taraxacum karakorium and Taraxacum affinis. On some east and south-facing slopes, common sea buckthorn is the dominant shrub, often associated with Berberis lyceum, and on some east-facing slopes at higher altitudes there are communities dominated by Rosa webbiana and Ribes orientale. Other herbaceous plants growing on the sparse grassland, especially in gullies and ravines, are Salix denticulata, Mertensia tibetica, Potentilla desertorum, Juniperus polycarpus, alpine bistort, Berberis pachyacantha and Spiraea lycioides.

Mountain weasel

Larger mammals found in this region include the Marco Polo sheep, markhor, ibex and urial. The snow leopard preys on these, and also on the pikas, hares and gamebirds found here. Other predators include the mountain weasel, beech marten, brown bear, Asian black bear, Turkestan lynx, red fox and Tibetan wolf. There are three species of lizard in the park but no amphibians.

The number of bird species present is low. The robin accentor and black-throated thrush overwinter here, and vultures, birds of prey, rosefinches, Himalayan monals and Güldenstädt's redstarts remain throughout the year, though they may move to somewhat lower elevations in winter. The park has been designated an Important Bird Area (IBA) by BirdLife International.

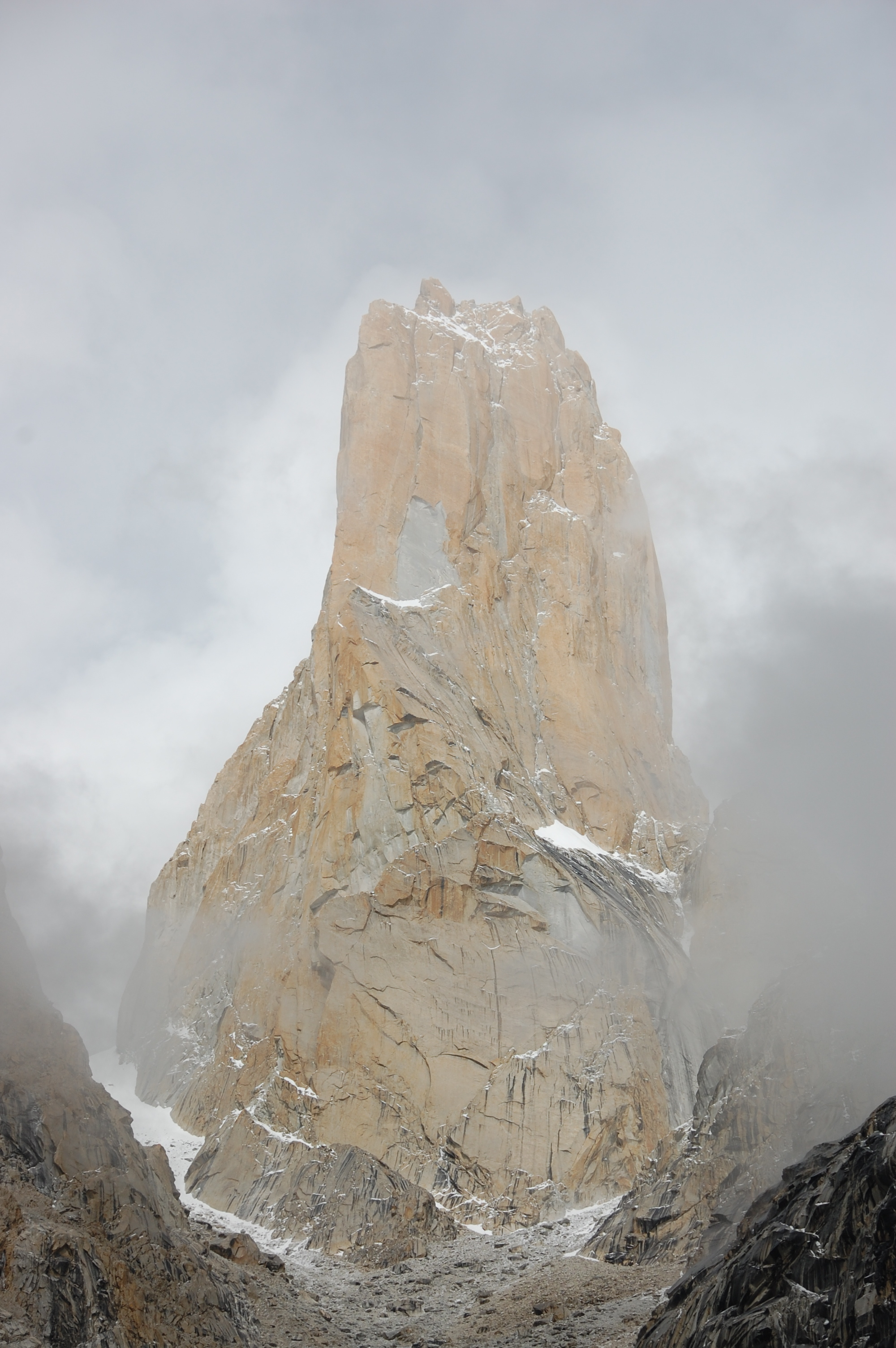
The Trango Towers offer some of the largest cliffs and most challenging rock climbing in the world.

== Climbing ==
Expeditions come each year to this area of the Karakorum to ascend the massive peaks, climb rocky crags and big sheer rock walls, and trek. Most expeditions visit the region in July and August, but some come as early as May and June, and September can be good for lower altitude climbing. One celebrated climbing area is Trango Towers, a group of some of the world tallest rock towers, situated in the park close to the route used to trek to the K2 base camp. Every year, a number of expeditions from all parts of the world visit the area to climb these most challenging granite towers.
