= Ghorat–Hazarajat alpine meadow =

Ghorat-Hazarajat alpine meadow
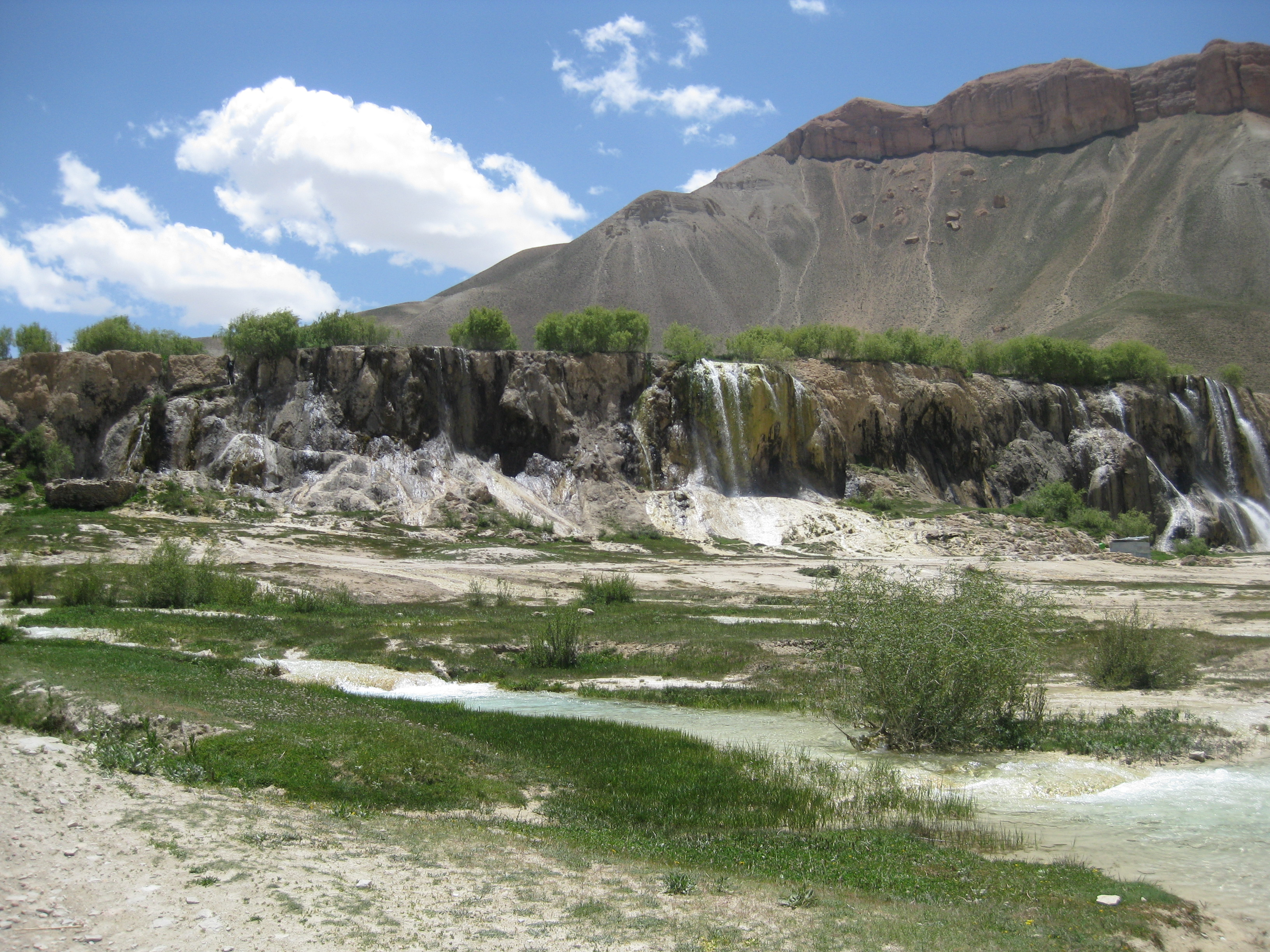
- Water fall in Band-e-Amir National Park

- Ecoregion territory (in purple)

Ecology
- Realm: Palearctic
- Biome: Montane grasslands and shrublands

Geography
- Area: 66,646 km^{2} (25,732 sq mi)
- Country: Afghanistan
- Coordinates: 34°43′11.79″N 66°57′2.46″E

The Ghorat-Hazarajat alpine meadow ecoregion (WWF ID: PA1004) covers the high mountainous elevations of central Afghanistan. The ecoregion fans out to the west from the capital city of Kabul at the eastern point. Vegetation is thornbush meadows and alpine grassland. The region is the home of the critically endangered Afghan brook salamander (Paradactylodon mustersi), which depends on the cold waters of the high streams of the ecoregion.

== Location and description ==
The Koh-i-Baba range of mountains is the western extension across Afghanistan of the Hindu Kush mountains. Elevations range from a low of 1,248 metres (4,094 ft) to a high of 4,868 metres (15,971 ft), with an average of 2,970 metres (9,740 ft). The ecoregion to the north is the Paropamisus xeric woodlands (xeric meaning dry), and the ecoregion to the south is the Central Afghan Mountains xeric woodlands.

== Climate ==
The climate of the ecoregion is Humid continental climate - Warm, dry summer sub-type (Köppen climate classification Dsb), with large seasonal temperature differentials and a warm summer (no month averaging over 22 °C (72 °F), and at least four months averaging over 10 °C (50 °F). The driest month between April and September has less than 1/3 the precipitation of the wettest month.

== Flora and fauna ==
The vegetation of the ecoregion is predominantly thornbush meadows and alphine grasslands. 72% of the ground in the ecoregion is herbaceous cover or shrubs; the remainder is bare ground. The habitat is considered vulnerable due to livestock grazing and diversion of water sources.

Over 190 species of vertebrates have been recorded in the ecoregion. Only one, however, is endemic - the endangered Afghan brook salamander, which may have a range of less than 10 square kilometers, and number fewer than 2,000 individuals. Birds of conservation interest include the near-threatened Cinereous vulture (Aegypius monachus), the endangered Egyptian vulture (Neophron percnopterus), the vulnerable Pale-backed pigeon (Columba eversmanni), and the endangered Rufous backed bunting (Emberiza jankowskii).

== Protected areas ==
Less than 1% of the ecoregion is officially protected. These protected areas include:

- Band-e Amir National Park
