= Hindu Kush alpine meadow =

Ecoregion primarily in Afghanistan

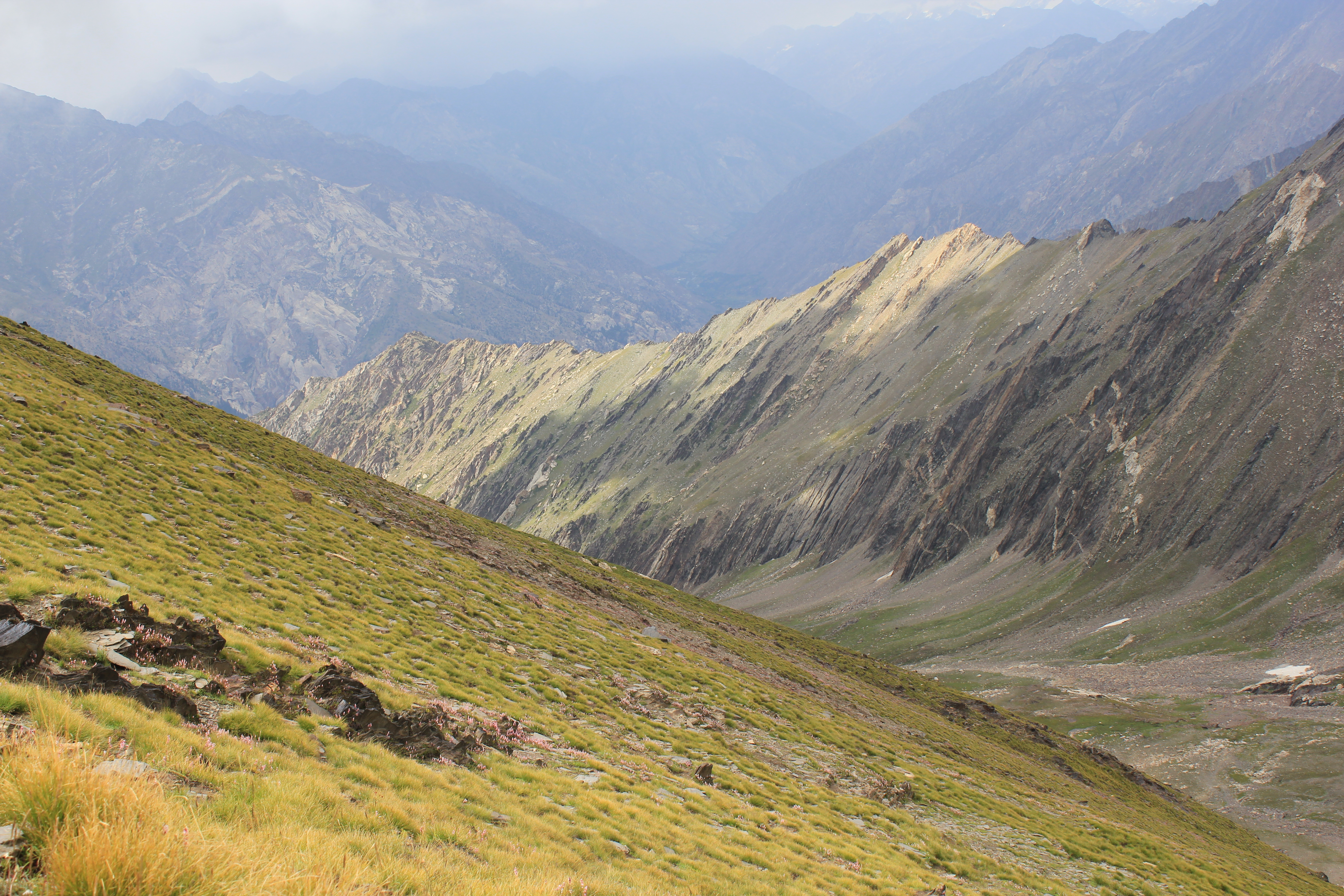
- Valley in Waygal District, Afghanistan

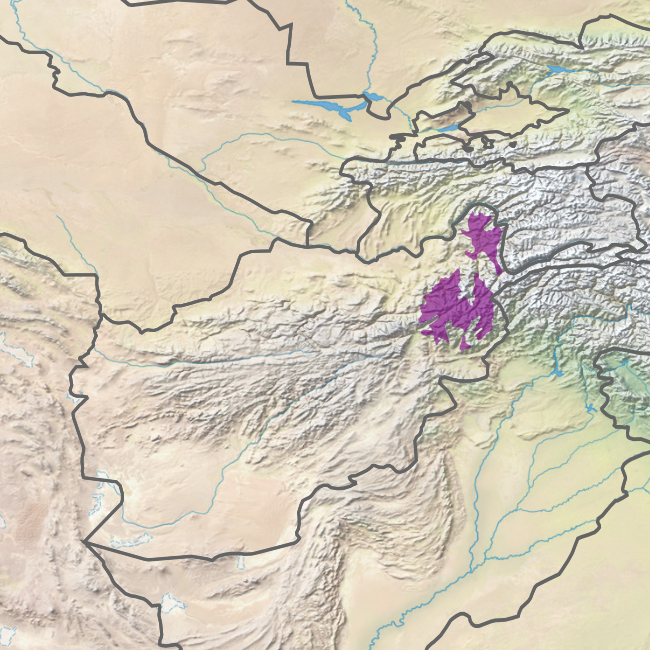
- Ecoregion territory (in purple)

Ecology
- Realm: Palearctic
- Biome: Montane grasslands and shrublands

Geography
- Area: 28,326 km^{2} (10,937 mi^{2})
- Countries: Afghanistan; Pakistan; Tajikistan
- Coordinates: 35.75°N 70.75°E

The Hindu Kush alpine meadow ecoregion (WWF ID: PA1005) covers a portion of the Hindu Kush Mountain Range in northern Afghanistan, northwestern Pakistan, and southern Tajikistan. Most of the terrain is between 3,000 and 4,000 meters in elevation. This portion of the Hindu Kush is very mountainous, with steep slopes. About half of the alpine meadow is bare rock or gravely soils with sparse vegetation. The remainder supports herbaceous cover of grasses and cushion plants. Human habitation is scarce and follows the river courses in the valleys.

== Location and description ==
The ecoregion occurs in two high-altitude sections, bisected by the Paropamisus xeric woodlands ecoregion, which averages 2,000 meters lower in elevation. The highest elevation in the ecoregion is 6,516 metres (21,378 ft); the lowest is 1,104 metres (3,622 ft). To the north, across the border in Tajikistan is the Gissaro-Alai open woodlands ecoregion on a western extension of the Tian Shan mountains. Much of the ground is bare rock or leptosol (gravely) soil, although the soil is often of high fertility.

== Climate ==
The climate of the ecoregion is Humid continental climate - Warm, dry summer sub-type (Köppen climate classification Dsb), with large seasonal temperature differentials and a warm summer (no month averaging over 22 °C (72 °F), and at least four months averaging over 10 °C (50 °F). The driest month between April and September has less than 1/3 the precipitation of the wettest month.

== Flora and fauna ==
The plants of the ecoregion have developed adaptations to the harsh, cold, and arid conditions. Because of the fertility of the soil where it exists, and the moisture from snow melt, there are extensive fields of alpine meadows. Cushion plants grow on rocky areas, achieving some protection against the cold by trapping heat against the ground.

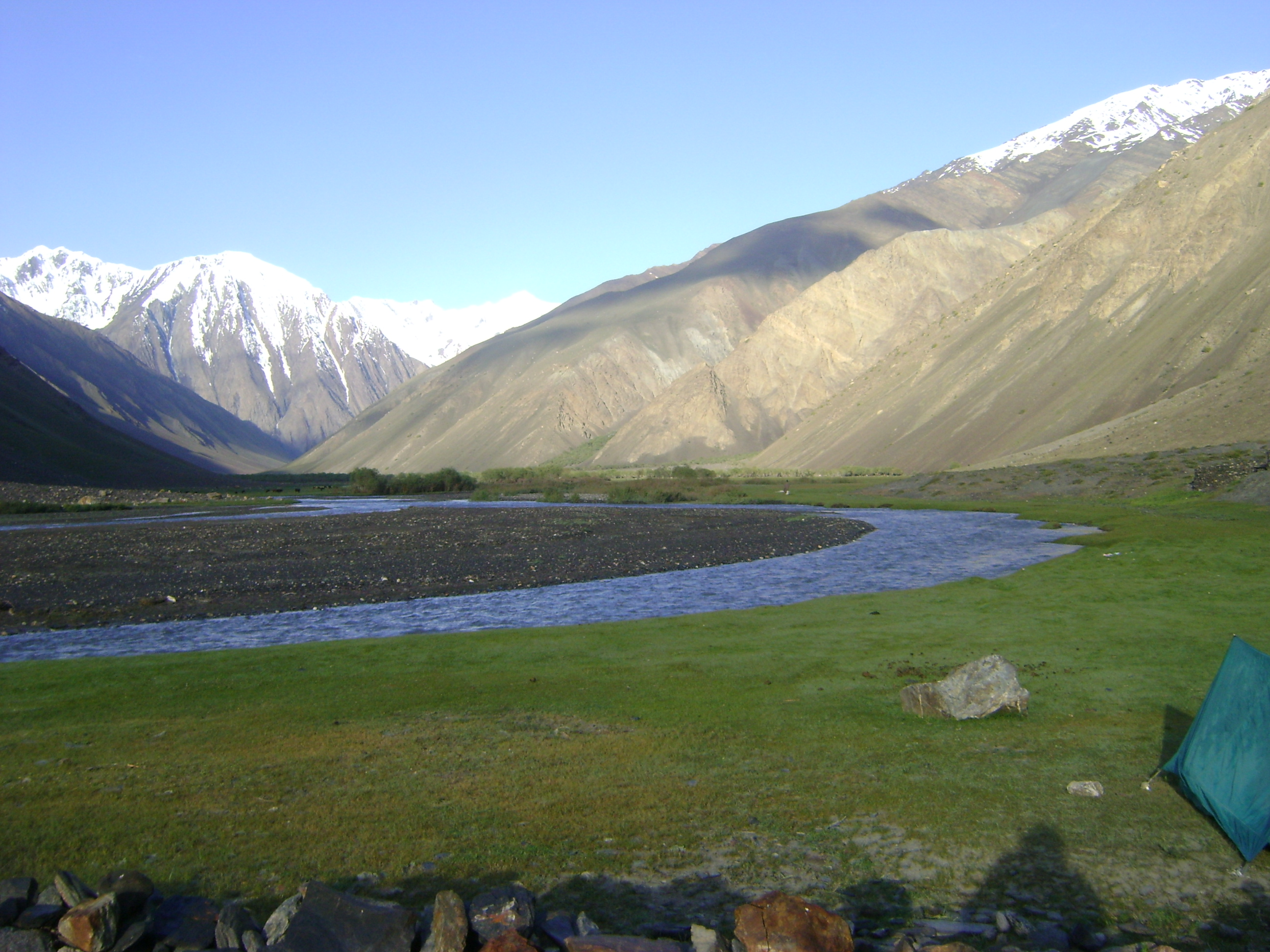
Ovir Arkari, Chitral (Pakistan), which is situated around the ecoregion.

Over 200 species of vertebrates have been recorded in the ecoregion. Animals of conservation interest include the near threatened Argali (Ovis ammon) (also known as the mountain sheep), the vulnerable Asiatic black bear (Ursus thibetanus), the near-threatened Eurasian otter (Lutra lutra), the near threatened Markhor (Capra falconeri) (also known as the Screw horn goat), the near threatened Mountain weasel (Mustela altaica), the vulnerable Common bent-winged bat (Miniopteris schreibersi), the vulnerable Snow leopard (Panthera uncia), the near threatened Striped hyena (Hyaena hyaena), and the endangered White-bellied musk deer (Moschus leucogaster).

== Protected areas ==
There are no protected areas in the ecoregion.
