= Paropamisus xeric woodlands =

Ecoregion in Afghanistan and Tajikistan

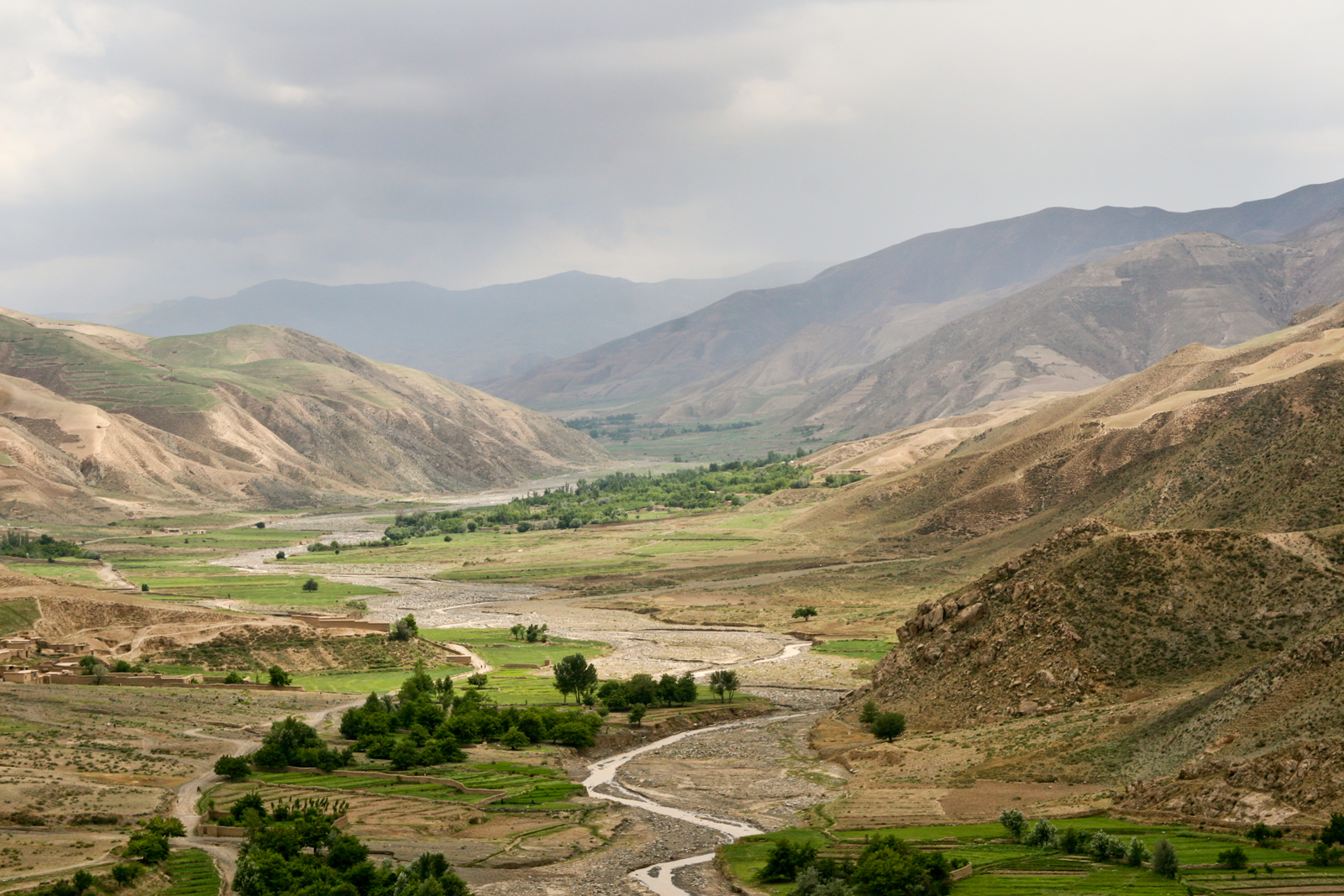
- Kunduz, Afghanistan

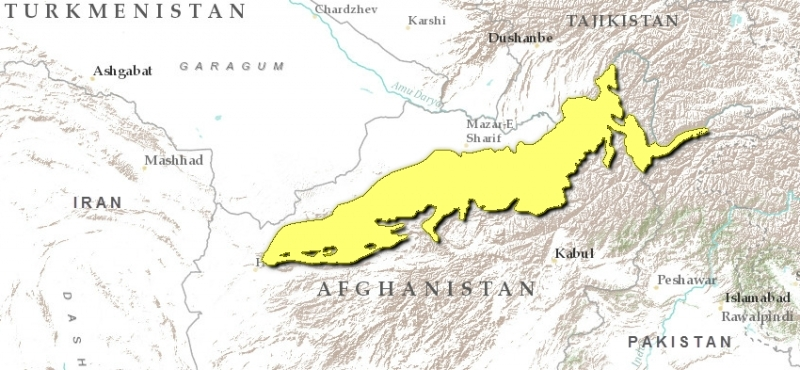
- Ecoregion territory (in yellow)

Ecology
- Realm: Palearctic
- Biome: Deserts and xeric shrublands

Geography
- Area: 92,804 km^{2} (35,832 mi^{2})
- Country: Afghanistan, Tajikistan
- Coordinates: 36.25°N 66.75°E

The Paropamisus xeric woodlands ecoregion (WWF ID: PA1322) covers the portion of northeastern Afghanistan north of the central mountain range and the Hindu Kush Mountains. The name is derived from the Old Persian name for the region, Parupraesanna ("Beyond the Hindu Kush"). While there are low canopy woodlands in the northeast of the ecorgegion, most of the territory is desert or xeric (dry) scrubland.

== Location and description ==
The ecoregion stretches for 1,100 kilometres (680 mi) across northern Afghanistan, from the city of Herat in the west to the Wakhan Corridor in the east. The territory is on the north slopes of the mountains of central Afghanistan and the Hindu Kush. To the north is the Badghyz and Karabil semi-desert ecoregion, to the south are the Ghorat-Hazarajat alpine meadow and Hindu Kush alpine meadow ecoregions.

The terrain is rugged: elevations range from 371 metres (1,217 ft) to a high point of 5,592 metres (18,346 ft).

== Climate ==
The climate of ecoregion is Cold semi-arid climate (Köppen climate classification (BSk)). This climate is characteristic of steppe climates intermediary between desert humid climates, and typically have precipitation is above evapotranspiration. At least one month averages below 0 °C (32 °F).

== Flora and fauna ==
Over 80% of the ecoregion is dry shrub. Another 8% is cultivated in crop agriculture (mostly along river valleys), and another 8% is sparse vegetation or bare ground. Common vegetation is thornbush, Ziziphus, and Acacia. There are areas of woodland in the northeast of the ecoregion in Badakhshan Province, featuring wild almond, pistachio, willow, and buckthorn trees. There are no endemic vertebrates, but the isolated areas support a range of non-endemic threatened and endangered species, including the near threatened Argali (Ovis ammon), the vulnerable Goitered gazelle (Gazella subgutturosa), the endangered Kulan (Equus hemionus), the near threatened Mountain weasel (Mustela altaica), and near threatened Sand cat (Felis margarita).

== Protected areas ==
Less than 1% of the ecoregion is officially protected. These protected areas include the Dashti-Jum Nature Reserve in Tajikistan.
