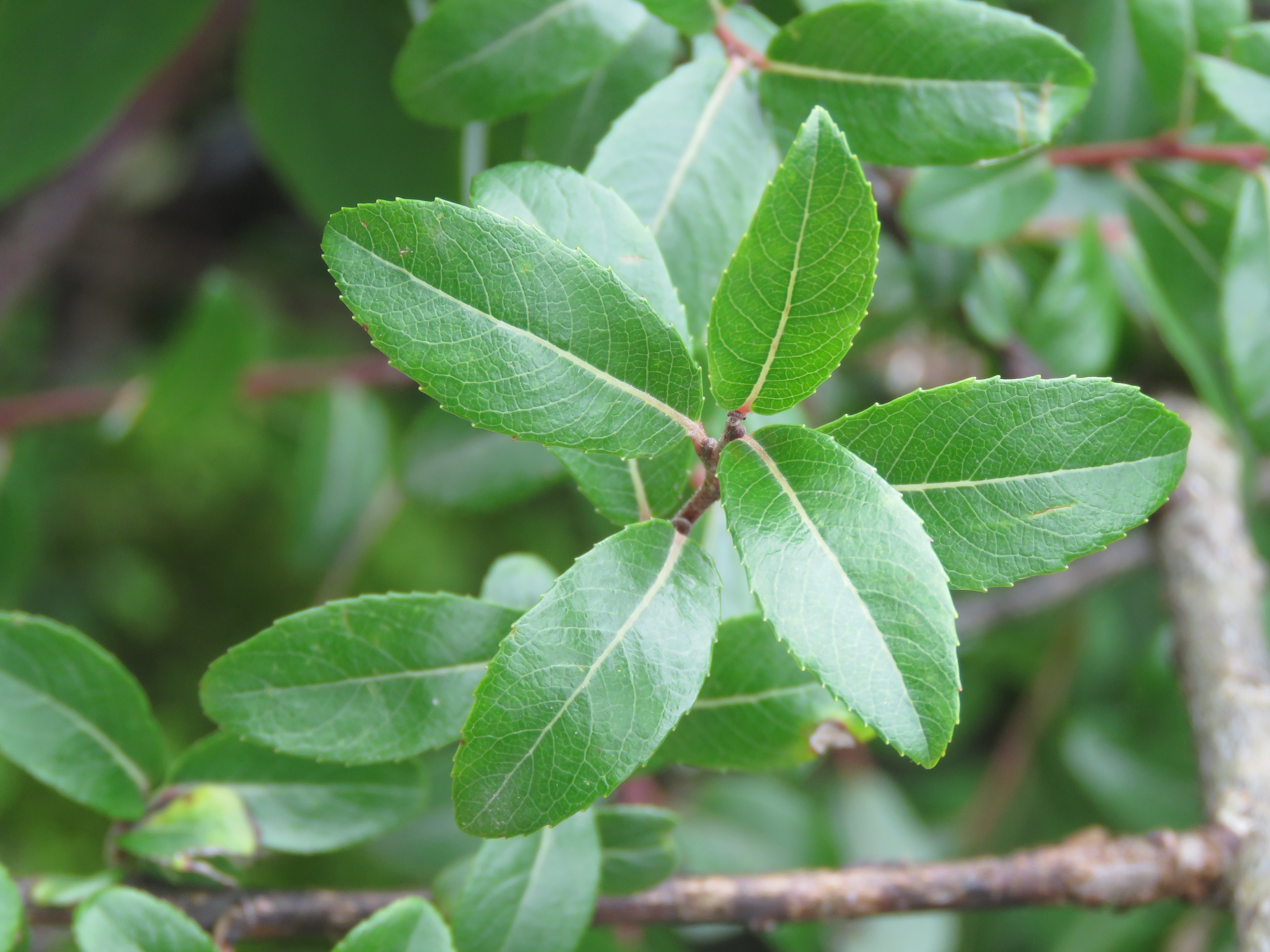

Scientific classification
- Kingdom: Plantae
- Clade: Tracheophytes
- Clade: Angiosperms
- Clade: Eudicots
- Clade: Rosids
- Order: Malpighiales
- Family: Salicaceae
- Genus: Salix
- Species: S. denticulata

Binomial name
- Salix denticulata Andersson

Synonyms
- Salix elegans Wallich ex Andersson

= Salix denticulata =

Species of shrub

Salix denticulata is a species of shrub or small tree in the family Salicaceae. It is a mountain species endemic to the Himalayan region.

== Description ==
Salix denticulata can reach a height of 6 m (20 ft). The shoots are downy when young. The dull green leaves are paler underneath, obovate, lanceolate or elliptic, with toothed margins, 3.5 by 1.2 to 2.2 centimetres (1.38 by 0.47 to 0.87 in) long, with very short petioles. Like all willows this species is dioecious. Male catkins are 2.5 cm (1 in) long, with yellow anthers, and female catkins 4 centimetres (1.6 in) long, lengthening to 9 centimetres (3.5 in) in fruit. The flowers bloom in April and May.

== Distribution ==
Salix denticulata is native to the mountainous regions of central Asia, being present in Afghanistan, Pakistan, Nepal, India and the Chinese provinces of Sichuan, Tibet and Yunnan. Its typical habitat is gullies and river valleys at around 2,500 m (8,200 ft).
