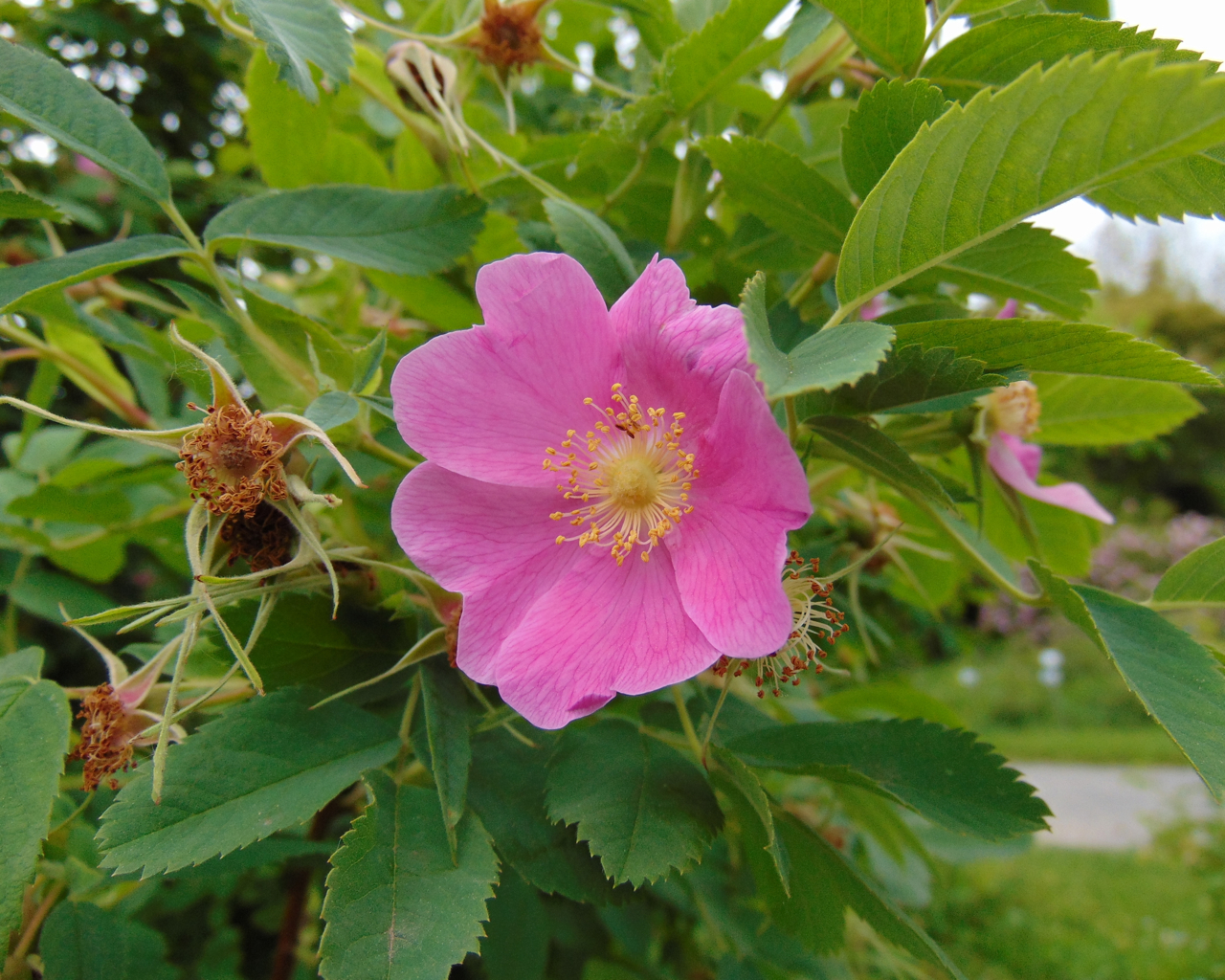
- Flower

Scientific classification
- Kingdom: Plantae
- Clade: Embryophytes
- Clade: Tracheophytes
- Clade: Spermatophytes
- Clade: Angiosperms
- Clade: Eudicots
- Clade: Rosids
- Order: Rosales
- Family: Rosaceae
- Genus: Rosa
- Species: R. webbiana

Binomial name
- Rosa webbiana Wall. ex Royle

Synonyms
- List: Rosa alaica Juz.; Rosa alticola Boulenger; Rosa caraganifolia Sumnev.; Rosa dawoensis Pax & K.Hoffm.; Rosa ellenae Chrshan.; Rosa epipsila Sumnev.; Rosa fedtschenkoana Regel; Rosa fedtschenkoana var. glandulosa Regel; Rosa fedtschenkoana var. lageniformis Regel; Rosa fedtschenkoana var. ovata Regel; Rosa fedtschenkoana var. pubescens Regel; Rosa glanduligera Kult.; Rosa hausimardonica Vassilcz.; Rosa hissarica Slobodov; Rosa holotricha Sumnev.; Rosa kirsanovae Sumnev.; Rosa korschinskiana Boulenger; Rosa kosingiana G.Don; Rosa krylovii Sumnev.; Rosa lavrenkoi Sumnev.; Rosa leiophylla Sumnev.; Rosa lipschitzii Sumnev.; Rosa minusculifolia Sumnev.; Rosa nanothamnus Boulenger; Rosa nudiflora Sumnev.; Rosa oligacantha Sumnev.; Rosa pycnantha Sumnev.; Rosa pyricarpa Sumn.; Rosa reverdattoi Sumnev.; Rosa rubens Sumn.; Rosa tytthantha Sumn.; Rosa tytthotricha Sumn.; Rosa unguicularis Bertol.; Rosa vvedenskyi Korotkova; Rosa webbiana var. genuina Crép.; Rosa webbiana var. latifolia Crép.; Rosa webbiana var. microphylla Crép.

= Rosa webbiana =

Species of flowering plant

Rosa webbiana, occasionally called Webb's rose, wild rose, or thorny rose, is a widely distributed species of flowering plant in the family Rosaceae. It is native to Central Asia, Tibet and Xinjiang in China, Afghanistan, Pakistan, the western Himalayas, and Nepal. It grows in scrub, grassy places, valleys, and slopes. A diploid, its chromosome count is 2n = 2x = 14.
