= Tian Shan montane steppe and meadows =

Ecoregion in Central Asia

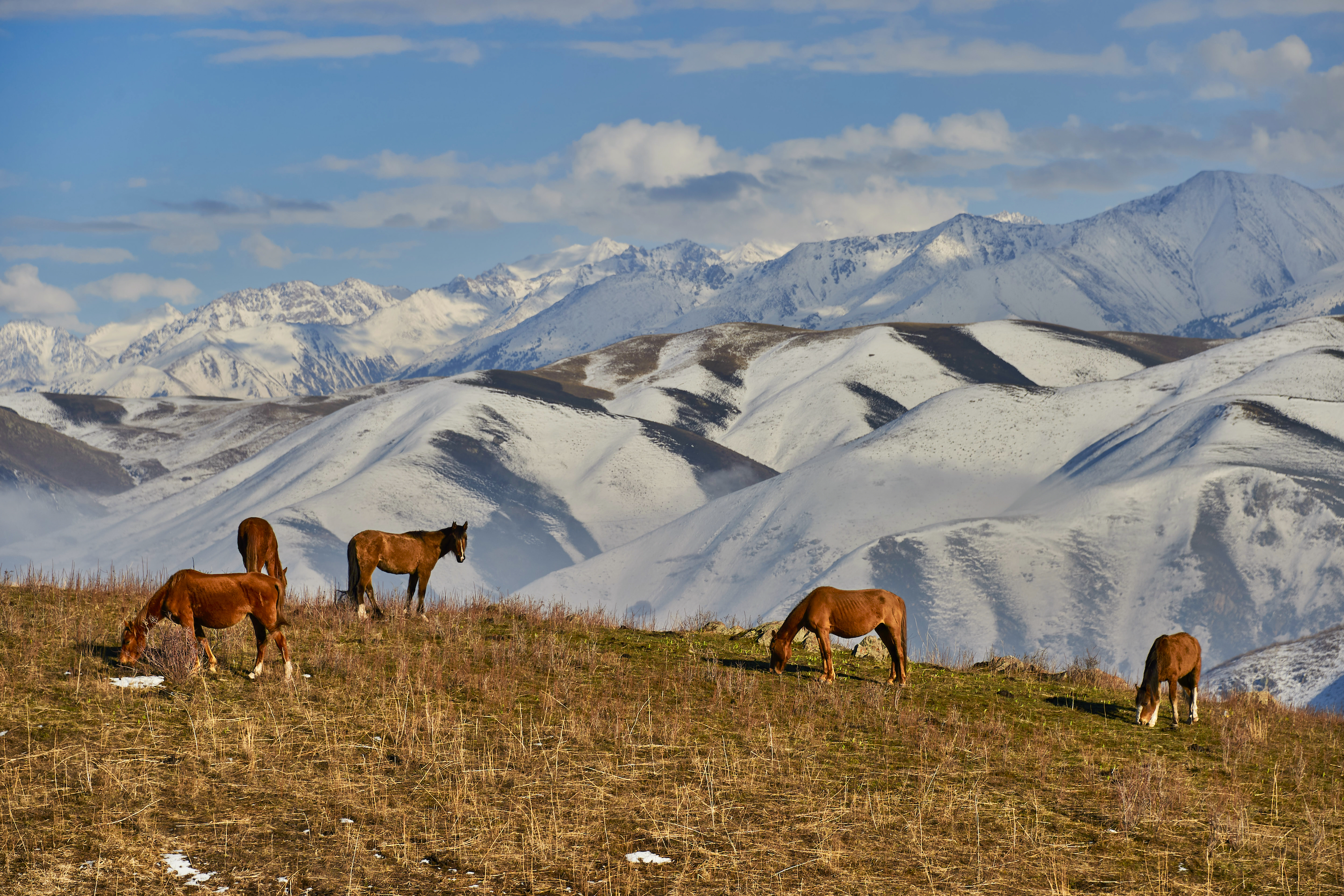
- Horses browsing a meadow in Ile-Alatau National Park, Kazakhstan

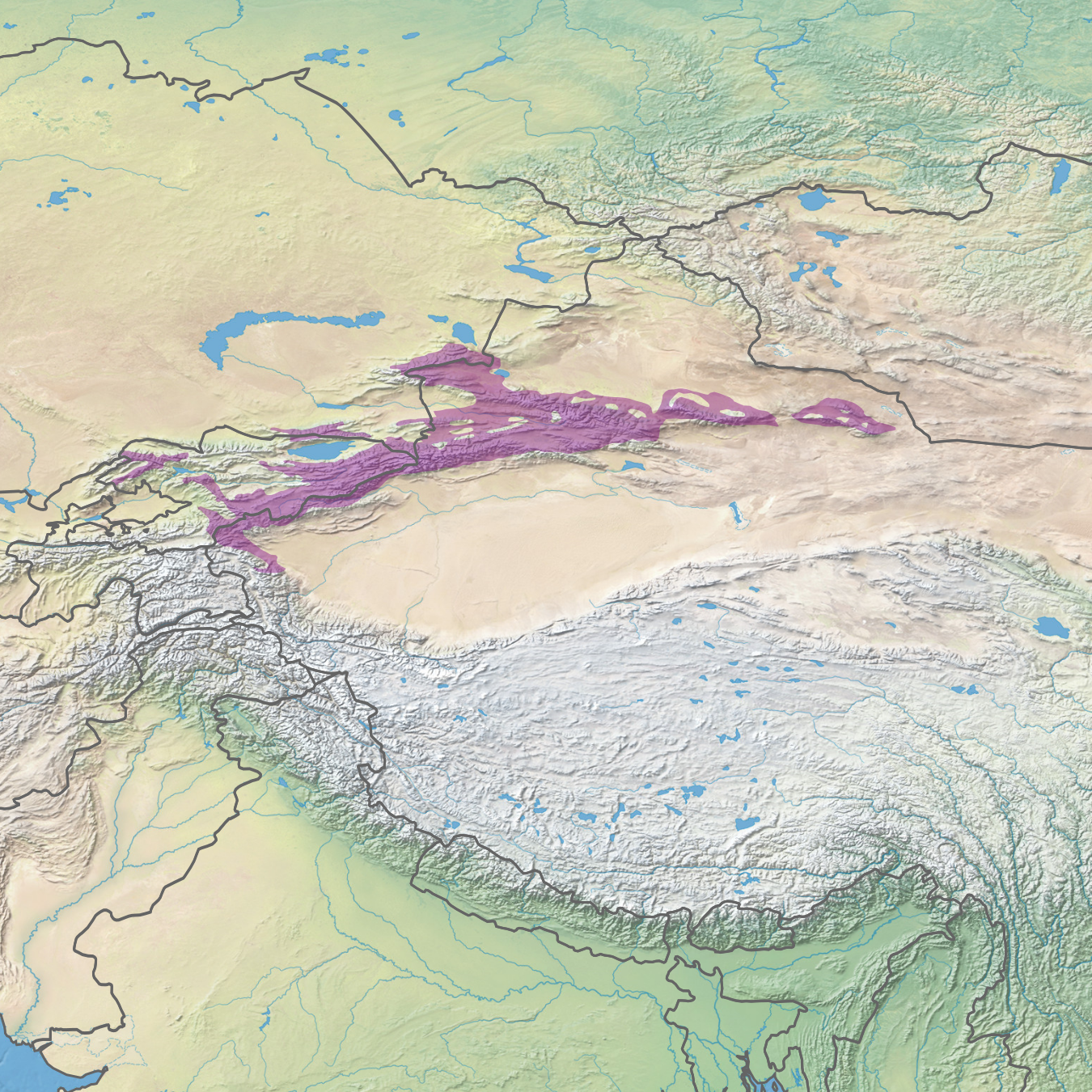
- Ecoregion territory (in purple)

Ecology
- Realm: Palearctic
- Biome: Montane grasslands and shrublands

Geography
- Area: 280,000 km^{2} (110,000 mi^{2})
- Countries: China, Kyrgyzstan, Tajikistan, Kazakhstan
- Coordinates: 44°15′N 85°45′E

The Tian Shan montane steppe and meadows ecoregion (WWF ID: PA1019) covers a 2,000 km long stretch of grasslands of the isolated Tian Shan mountains of Central Asia. It is characterized by high-altitude flat and rolling grasslands.

== Location and description ==
The ecoregion stretches around the lower altitudes of the Tian Shan mountain ridge, running for approximately 2,000 km from western Kyrgyzstan to eastern Xinjiang Province in China. It separates the arid Tarim Basin and Taklimakan Desert to the south from the Junggar Basin and Kazakh Shield to the north. Running up the middle of the ecoregion is the main ridge of the Tian Shan, with some middle altitudes supporting conifer forests in the Tian Shan montane conifer forests ecoregion.

== Climate ==
The climate of the ecoregion is cold semi-arid (Köppen climate classification (BSk)). This climate is generally characterized as having precipitation greater than a true desert, and also a colder temperature.

== Flora and fauna ==
Biodiversity in the ecoregion is relatively high due to the extreme altitude range, supporting different species at different elevation levels, and due to the relatively large size of the ecoregion and its relatively central location between different floristic zones. The lowest elevations - 1,100 to 2,700 meters - are mostly grasslands of fescue (Festuca) and feather grass (Stipa). In the alpine region above 2,700 meters there are meadows of Kobresia and Carex sedges.
