= Badghyz and Karabil semi-desert =

Ecoregion in Asia

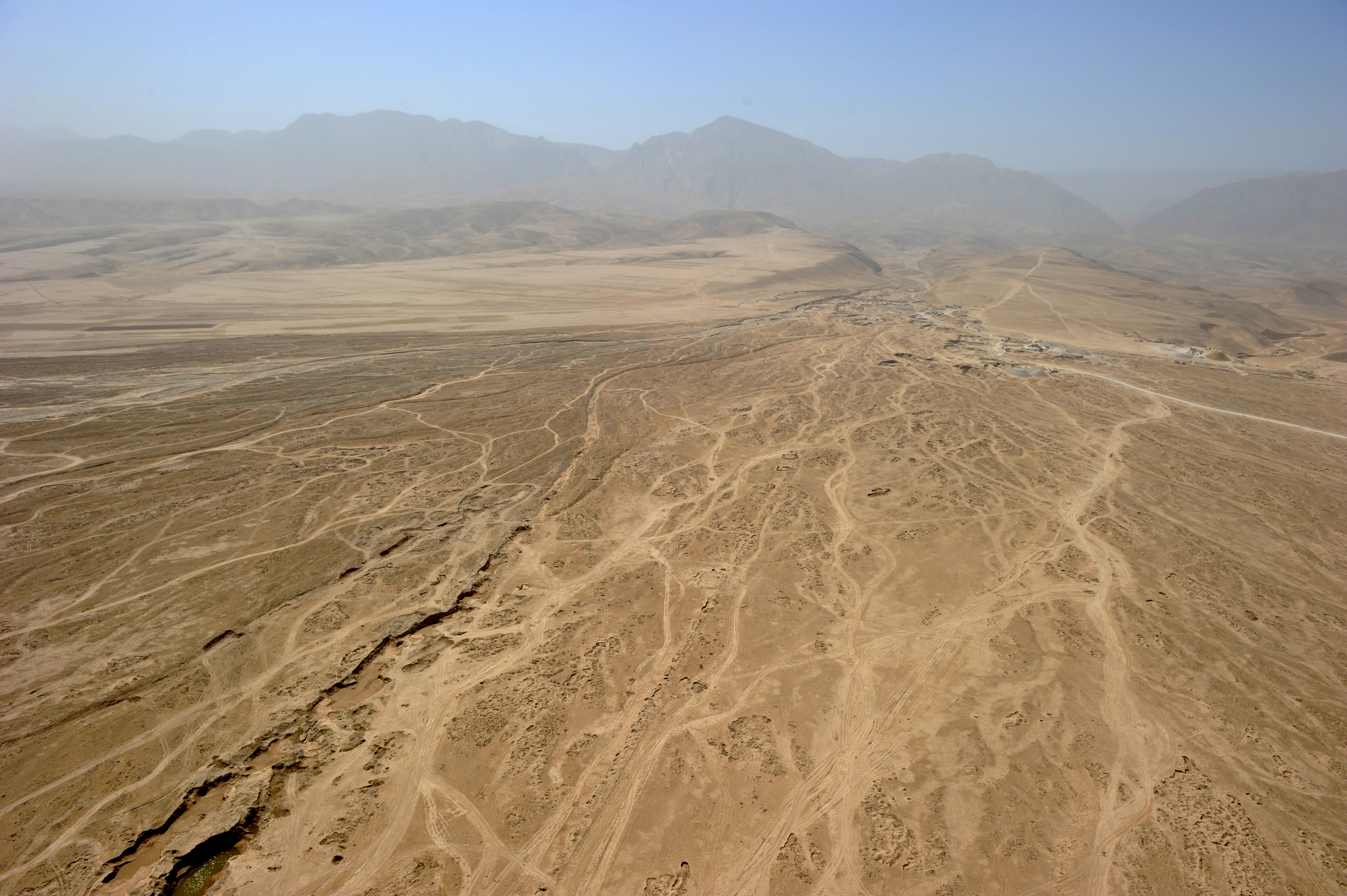
- Desert in Balkh Province, Afghanistan

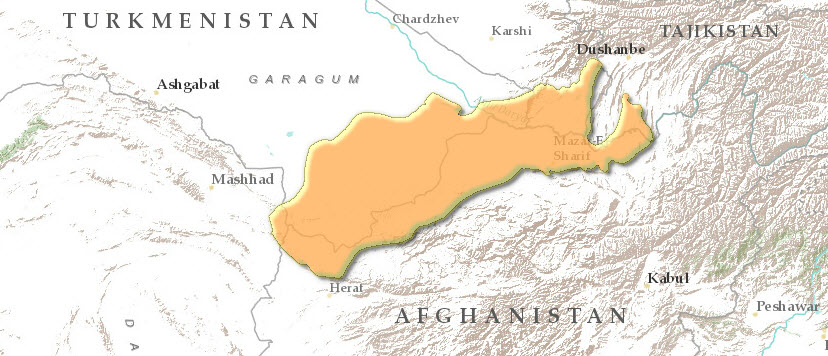
- Ecoregion territory (in orange)

Ecology
- Realm: Palearctic
- Biome: Deserts and xeric shrublands

Geography
- Area: 133,643 km^{2} (51,600 mi^{2})
- Countries: Turkmenistan, Afghanistan, Uzbekistan, Tajikistan, Iran
- Coordinates: 36.25°N 63.75°E

The Badghyz and Karabil semi-desert ecoregion (WWF ID: PA1306) covers the hills north of the central mountain ranges of Afghanistan, southeast Turkmenistan, and portions of Uzbekistan and Tajikistan. The landscape has been described as "savannah-like" and reminiscent of Africa, with desert sedges (Carex) and stands of wild pistachio trees (Pistacia vera). The area supports high biodiversity and a number of rare and endemic species, such as the endangered Turkmenian kulan (Equus hemionus kulan).

== Location and description ==
The hilly ecoregion is situated between the large sandy Karakum Desert to the north, the Koyentag ('Impassable') Mountains to the east, the Parapamiz Mountains of the Hindu Kush in Afghanistan to the south, and Kopet Dag Mountains of Turkmenistan and Iran to the southwest. Throughout the region are large depressions of dried salt pans, supporting salt-tolerant plants.

== Climate ==
The climate of the ecoregion is predominantly cold semi-arid (Köppen climate classification BSk) with smaller areas of Hot-summer Mediterranean (Csa) and hot desert (BWh). This climate is characterized hot, sometimes very hot, dry summers and mild, wet winters. The hottest month averages over 22 °C (72 °F), and the coldest 0–18 °C (32–64 °F). Precipitation in the Badhyz Nature Reserve varies from 130 mm/year to 430 mm/year. Winds are often strong, typically from the North and Northwest.

== Flora and fauna ==
Biodiversity is high in the region, as the climate is relatively mild, and the location is in a transition zone that supports both Iranian-Afghan and Central Asian floral communities. Over 1,100 species of vascular plants have been recorded in the region. The dominant plants are desert sedges, particularly (Carex pachystylis). Also found are Artemisia shrubs, Saltwort, and Saxaul. Protected areas have been set aside to protect groves of the wild Pistachio trees, with one covering 760 km^{2} (290 sq mi).

The region supports important populations of large mammals, such as the near-threatened Asiatic wild ass (Onager) and the Goitered gazelle. The endangered Egyptian vulture is also found in the region.

== Protections ==
Significant protected areas in the ecoregion include:

- Köýtendag Nature Reserve
- Badhyz State Nature Reserve
