= Pamir alpine desert and tundra =

Ecoregion in the Pamir Mountains

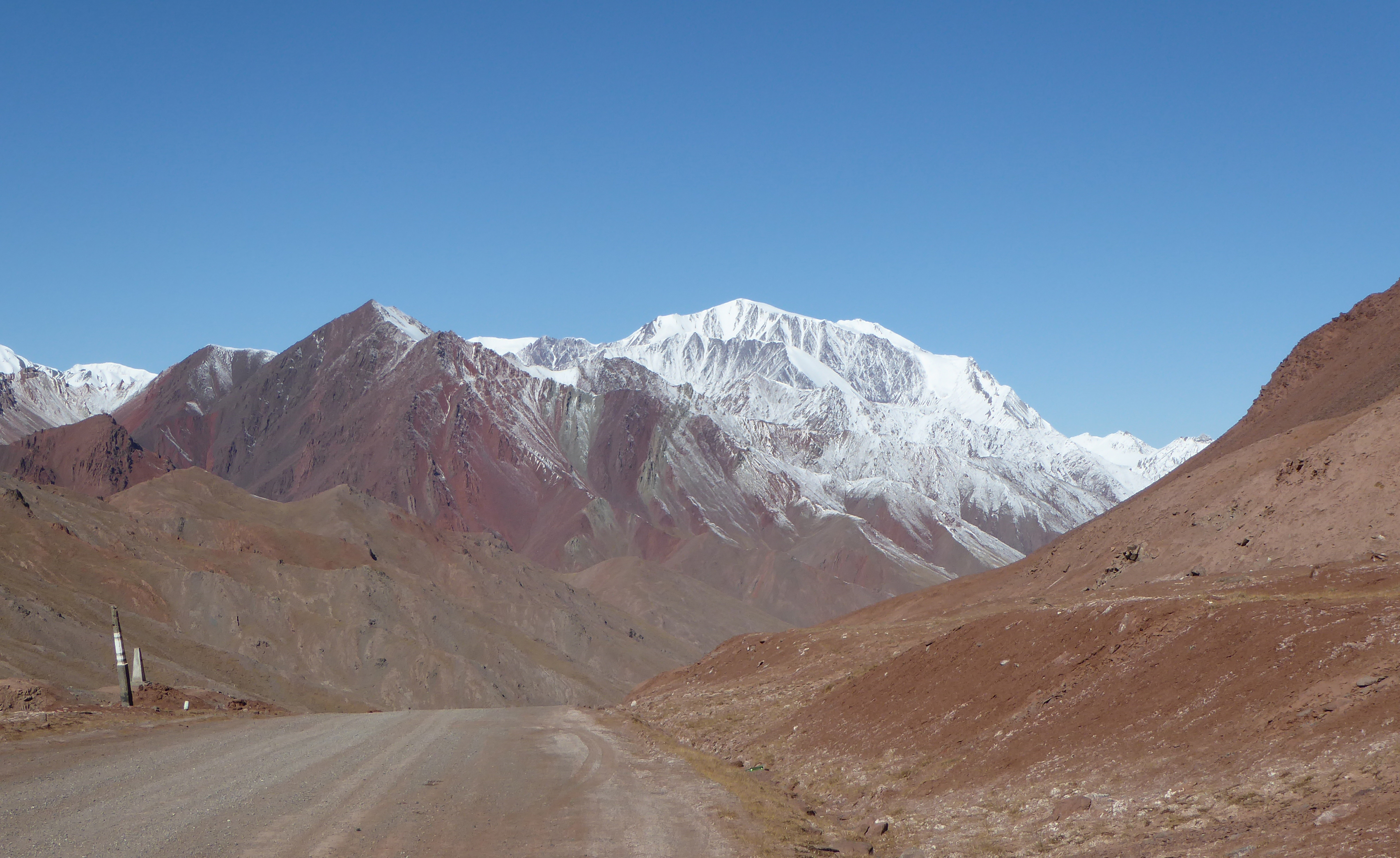
- Pamir Mountains

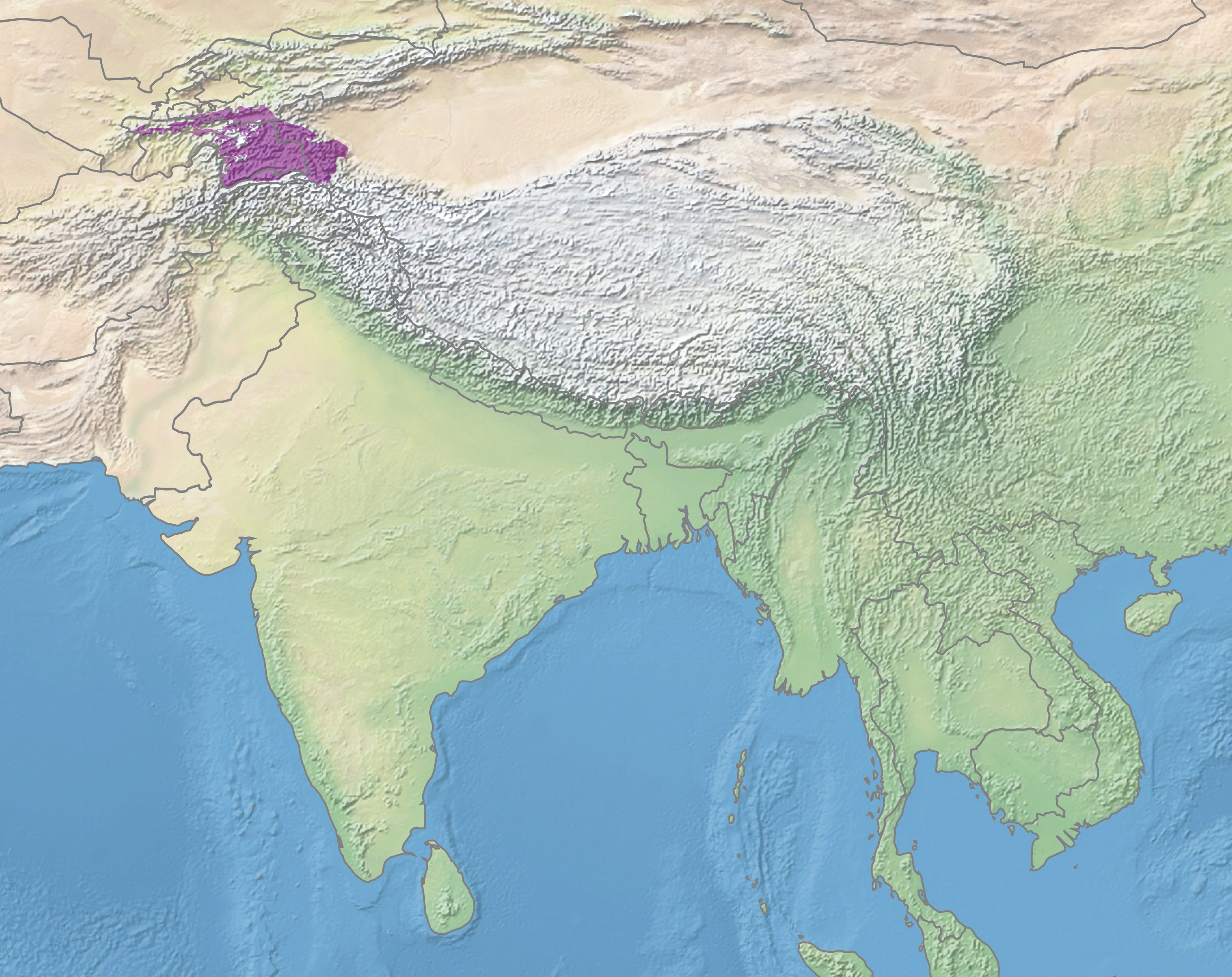
- Ecoregion territory (in purple)

Ecology
- Realm: Palearctic
- Biome: Montane grasslands and shrublands

Geography
- Area: 118,000 km^{2} (46,000 mi^{2})
- Countries: Kyrgyzstan, Tajikistan, China, Afghanistan, Pakistan
- Coordinates: 38°12′N 72°40′E

The Pamir alpine desert and tundra ecoregion (WWF ID: PA1014) covers the high plateau of the Pamir Mountains, at the central meeting of the great mountain ranges of Central Asia: Himalaya, Karakoram, Hindu Kush, Kunlun, and Tian Shan. It is a region of relatively high biodiversity due to its central location and high elevation differentials, but it also acts as a barrier between the climate and habitats of north and south Asia.

== Location and description ==
The ecoregion is mostly located in the eastern region of Tajikistan, on a high plateau with broad valleys and steeply-sloping mountains. The ecoregion measures about 275 km west-to-east, and 250 km north-to-south. Major mountain ranges radiate outwards: the Tian Shan to the northeast, Hindu Kush to the west, Karakoram to the south and Himalayas to the south and east. The Pamir also sit in the middle of different climates and habitats: the Alai woodlands to the west and north, and the dry Tarim Basin to the east. The average elevation in the Pamir is 4,200 meters, with the highest peak (Kongur Tagh) at 7,649 meters.

== Climate ==
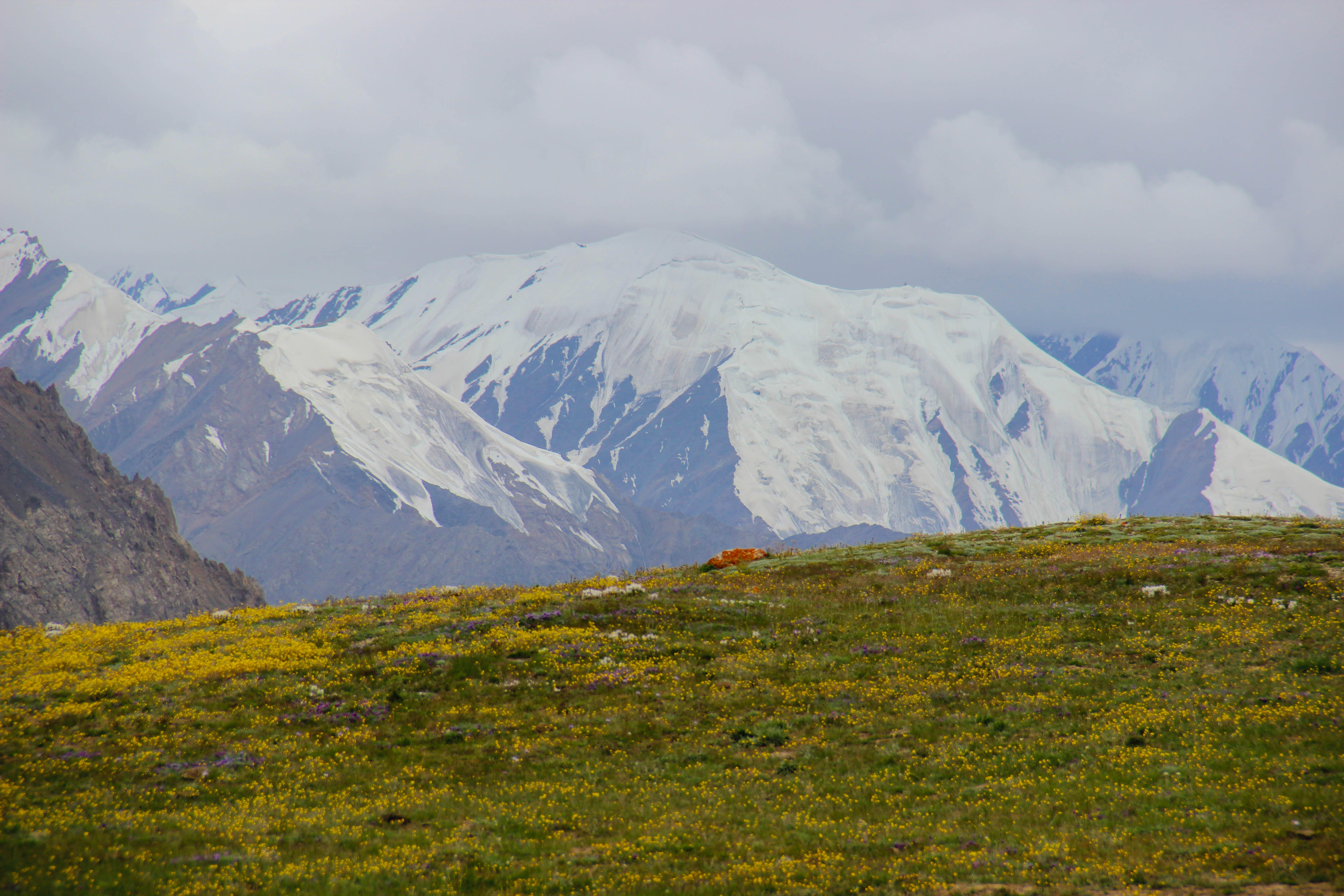
Khunjerab Pass, Pakistan, is situated around the borders of the ecoregion, with the neighbouring Karakoram–West Tibetan Plateau alpine steppe nearby.

Many climate zones are found in the ecoregion, due to the altitude zones and geographic surroundings. Typical high elevations exhibit a climate classification of a Tundra or Alpine climate (Köppen climate classification (ET)). Lower elevations trend into a Subarctic climate (Dsc) (mean temperatures may rise above 10 °C (50 °F) for 1–3 months each summer).

== Flora and fauna ==
Most of the territory is cold- or semi-desert. Large areas at high altitudes are devoid of vegetation due to the harsh polar climate. At the lowest elevations, the gravely terrain is marked by halophytes (salt-tolerant plants), such as various types of Salicornia. Higher up, the steppe terrain is characterized by sub-shrubs such as Acantholimon, sagebrush (Artemisia), and needle-grass (Stipa). Somewhat higher steppe terrain includes tufted grasses (Festuca).

Several notable species of mammals inhabit the area, including the vulnerable Snow leopard, the endangered Himalayan brown bear subspecies, the near-endangered Marco Polo sheep, and various other types of sheep and goats. The Long-tailed marmot is common.

== See also ==
- Ecoregions in China
