= List of amphibians of Pakistan =

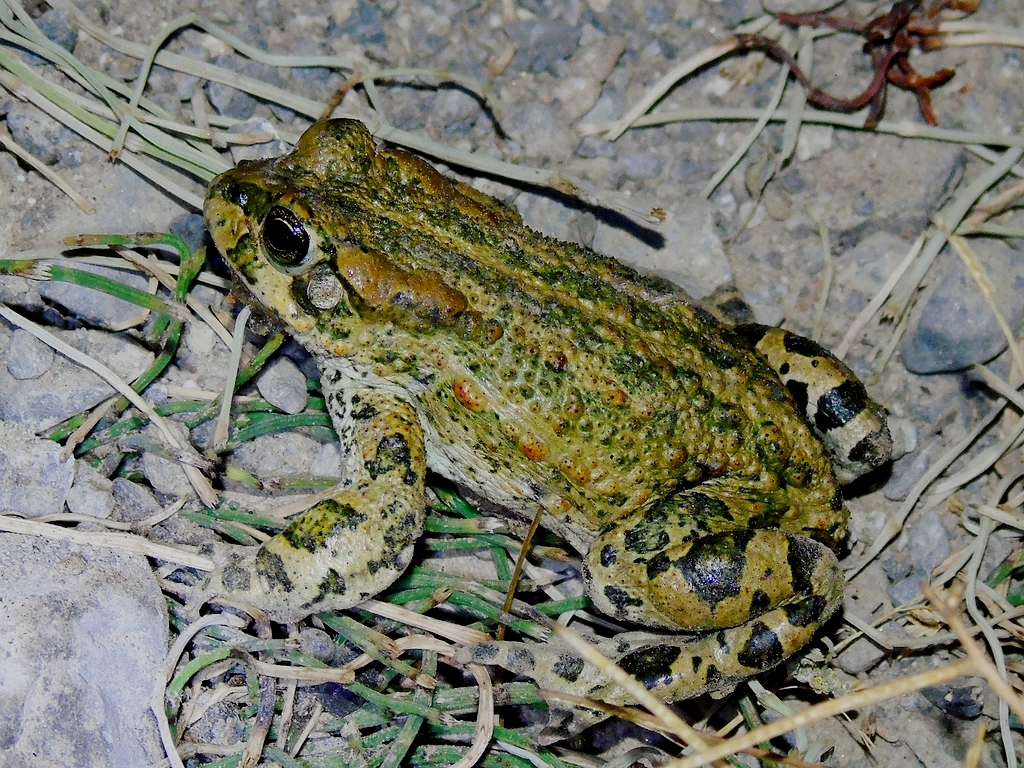
Bufotes latastii, Pakistan

This list of the amphibians of Pakistan currently contains 19 confirmed species that are known to occur in Pakistan.

== Order Anura ==
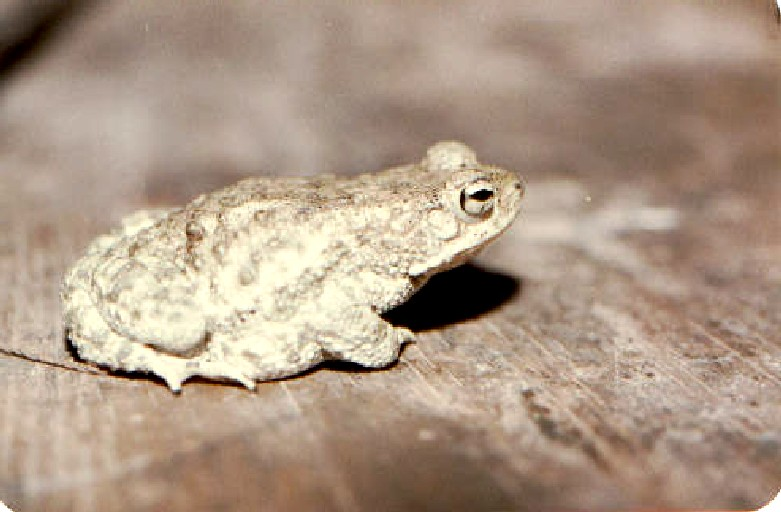
The Indus Valley toad is the national amphibian of Pakistan

- Family Bufonidae (true toads) - 8 species
  - Bufo himalayanus (Himalayan toad)
  - Bufo latastii (Baltistan toad)
  - Bufo melanostictus (common Indian toad)
  - Bufo olivaceus (olive toad)
  - Bufo pseudoraddei
    - Bufo p. pseudoraddei (Kaghan toad)
    - Bufo p. baturae (Batura toad)
  - Bufo stomaticus (Indus Valley toad or marbled toad) the national amphibian of Pakistan
  - Bufo surdus (Iranian toad or Pakistan toad)
  - Bufo viridis zugmayeri (European green toad or Baluchistan toad)
- Family Microhylidae (narrow-mouthed frogs) - 2 species
  - Microhyla ornata (ornate narrow-mouthed frog or ant frog)
  - Uperodon systoma (marbled balloon frog)
- Family Megophryidae (Asian toads and litter frogs) - 1 confirmed species
  - Scutiger nyingchiensis (Tibetan frog or Asian lazy toad)
  - Scutiger occidentalis (Deosai toad) - unconfirmed
  - Scutiger pleskei - unconfirmed

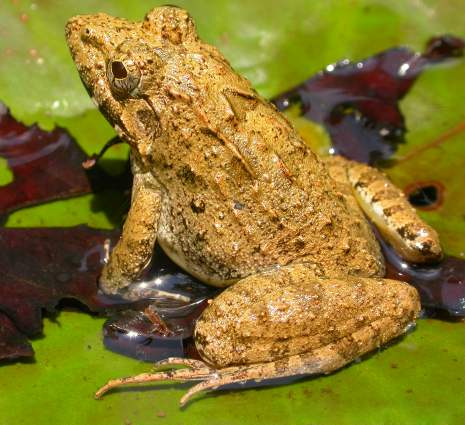
Indus Valley bullfrog

- Family Ranidae (broad-mouthed frogs or true frogs) - 8 species
  - Euphlyctis cyanophlyctis (Indian skipper frog or skittering frog) - 3 subspecies
    - Euphlyctis c. cyanophlyctis (common skittering frog)
    - Euphlyctis c. microspinulata (spiny skittering frog)
    - Euphlyctis c. seistanica (Seistan skittering frog)
  - Fejervarya limnocharis (alpine cricket frog or northern cricket frog)
  - Fejervarya syhadrensis (Indus cricket frog or southern cricket frog)
  - Hoplobatrachus tigerinus (Indus Valley bullfrog)
  - Paa hazarensis (Hazara torrent frog)
  - Paa sternosignata (Karez frog)
  - Paa vicina (Murree Hills frog)
  - Sphaerotheca breviceps (Indian burrowing frog or Malir burrowing frog)
