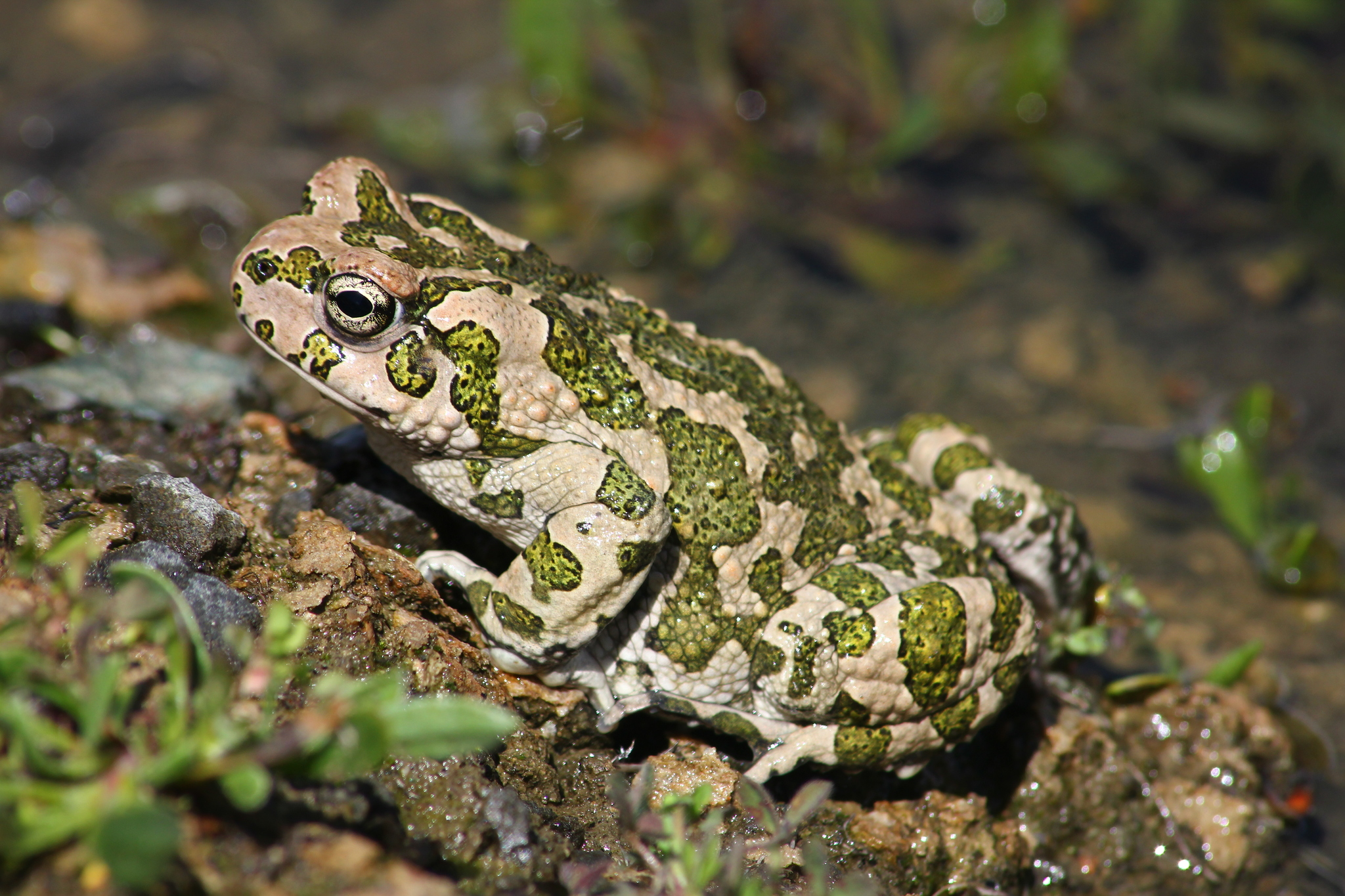

Conservation status
- Near Threatened (IUCN 3.1)

Scientific classification
- Kingdom: Animalia
- Phylum: Chordata
- Class: Amphibia
- Order: Anura
- Family: Bufonidae
- Genus: Bufotes
- Species: B. cypriensis

Binomial name
- Bufotes cypriensis Litvinchuk, Mazepa, Jablonski & Dufresnes, 2019

= Cyprus green toad =

Species of toad

The Cyprus green toad (Bufotes cypriensis) is a species of true toad found only on the island of Cyprus in the eastern Mediterranean Sea. It is the only species of toad in the country and it is a fairly common sight near wetlands or any waterbody. Until 2019, it was considered the same species as the European green toad.

== Taxonomy ==
All 14 species of the genus Bufotes were thought to be a species group (viridis) of the genus Bufo. However, a major study in 2006 revealed that this group should be moved out of Bufo into their own genus, Pseudepidalea, which was later revealed to be a junior synonym of Bufotes. Bufotes cypriensis, the Cyprus green toad, is the most recently recognized species of this genus and it was believed to be the same as Bufotes viridis, the European green toad, until 2019.

== Distribution and habitat ==
Range map of B. cypriensis

The Cyprus green toad is endemic to Cyprus and it is more widespread in the north and northeast of the island. It can be found in meadows, grasslands, forests, shrublands and steppe habitats, as well as a range of wetland areas and any waterbody that is exposed to direct sunlight. It can be found from sea level to an altitude of 700 metres (2,300 ft). All of its range lies within the Cyprus Mediterranean forests ecoregion.

== See also ==
- List of amphibians of Cyprus
