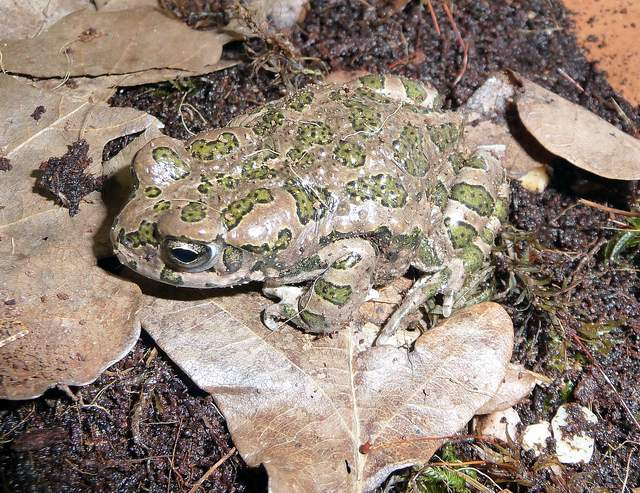

Conservation status
- Least Concern (IUCN 3.1)

Scientific classification
- Kingdom: Animalia
- Phylum: Chordata
- Class: Amphibia
- Order: Anura
- Family: Bufonidae
- Genus: Bufotes
- Species: B. pewzowi

Binomial name
- Bufotes pewzowi (Bedriaga, 1898)

Synonyms
- Bufo viridis var. Pewzowi Bedriaga, 1898; Bufo viridis var. strauchi Bedriaga, 1898; Bufo viridis var. grum-grzimailoi Bedriaga, 1898; Bufo viridis unicolor Kashchenko, 1909; Bufo nouettei Mocquard, 1910; Bufo viridis asiomontanus Pisanets and Shcherbak, 1979; Bufo tianschanica Toktosunov, 1984; Bufo danatensis taxkorensis Fei, Ye, and Huang, 1999; Bufo danatensis pewzowi (Bedriaga, 1898); Bufo tianschanicus Toktosunov, 1984 (correction of gender); Bufo taxkorensis (Fei, Ye, and Huang, 1999); Pseudepidalea pewzowi (Bedriaga, 1898); Pseudepidalea taxkorensis (Fei, Ye, and Huang, 1999); (incomplete list)

= Bufotes pewzowi =

Species of amphibian

Bufotes pewzowi is a species of toad in the family Bufonidae. It is found in dry plains of Central Asia, the foothills and mountains of Tian Shan, Zhungar Alatau and Pamir Mountains (Kazakhstan, Kyrgyzstan, Uzbekistan, and Tajikistan), the mountains and deserts of Western China and Mongolia, and probably westward to northern Afghanistan and north to Lake Balkhash in Kazakhstan and northeast Altai Republic in Russia. The specific name pewzowi honours Mikhail Pevtsov, a Russian geographer, cartographer, and explorer. Common names include Xinjiang toad and Pewzow's toad; when subspecies B. p. strauchi is recognized, it can be referred to as northern Xinjiang toad, while the nominotypic B. p. pewzowi then becomes southern Xinjiang toad.

== Description ==
Bufotes pewzowi is a tetraploid species that originates from hybridization between Bufotes latastii and Bufotes perrini. Adult males measure 52–77 mm (2.0–3.0 in) and adult females 50–86 mm (2.0–3.4 in) in snout–vent length. Gosner stage 35–37 tadpoles measure about 45 mm (1.8 in) in total length, of which the tail makes almost two thirds.

== Habitat and conservation ==
Bufotes pewzowi occurs in dry steppes, grasslands, semi-deserts and deserts, and in mountains from foothills through all altitudinal belts up to subalpine meadows, perhaps to over 4,000 m (13,000 ft) above sea level. The tadpoles develop in oases, ponds, and pools. It is a very common species that can be found in very disturbed habitat. No major threats to this species are known. It can suffer from extreme habitat modification and from collection for traditional medicine. It probably occurs in several protected areas within its range.
