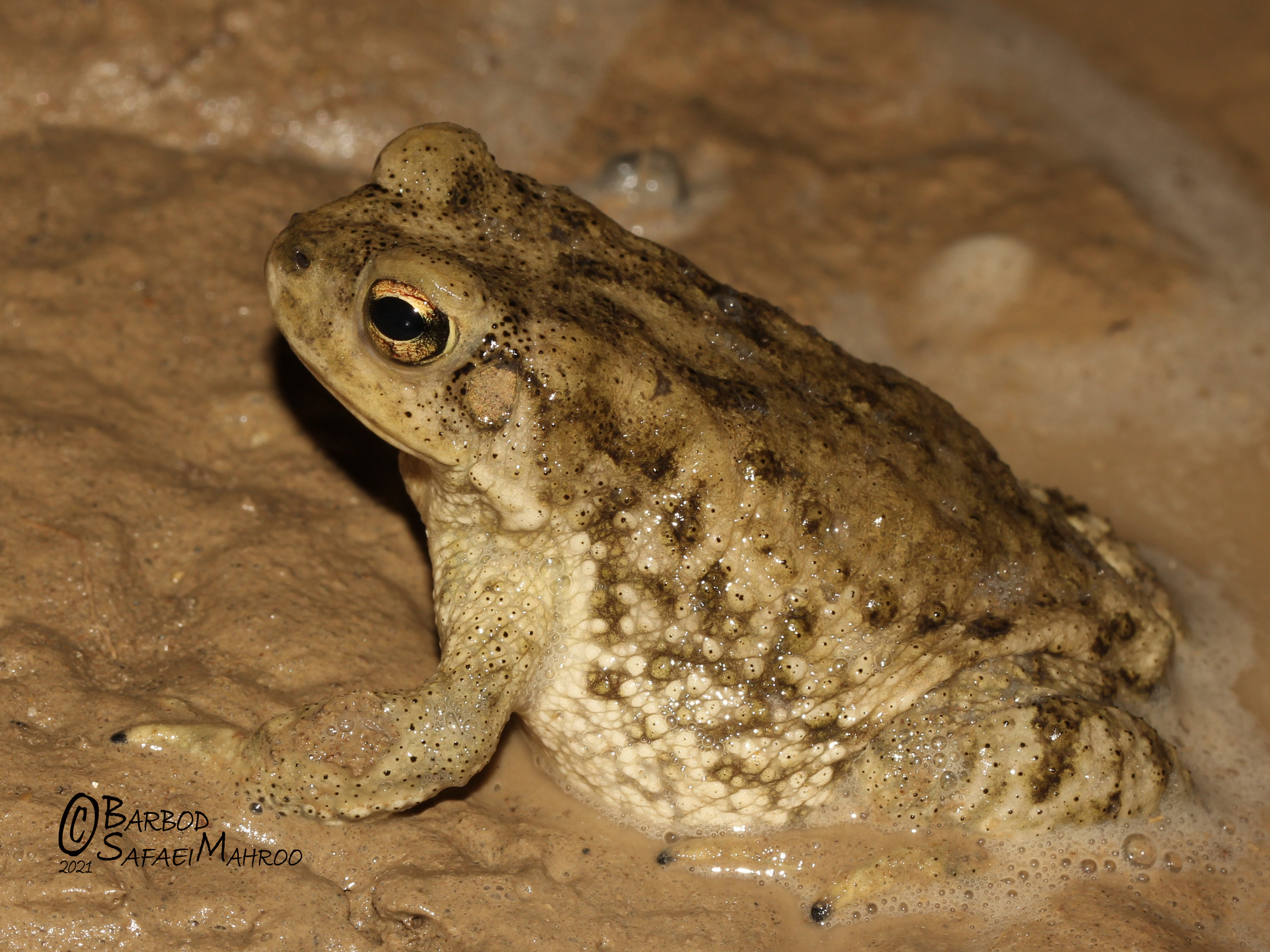
- Firouzophrynus stomaticus

Scientific classification
- Kingdom: Animalia
- Phylum: Chordata
- Class: Amphibia
- Order: Anura
- Family: Bufonidae
- Genus: Firouzophrynus; Safaei-Mahroo and Ghaffari, 2020

Species
- See text

= Firouzophrynus =

Genus of toads

Firouzophrynus is a genus of amphibians in the family Bufonidae found in parts of the Middle East and South Asia. This genus was named in 2020 by Iranian herpetologists Barbod Safaei-Mahroo and Hanyeh Ghaffari in honor of Eskandar Firouz, founder of environment department in Iran, who died in 2020.

== Species ==
Firouzophrynus contains 5 species :

- Firouzophrynus dhufarensis (Parker, 1931)
- Firouzophrynus hololius (Günther, 1876)
- Firouzophrynus olivaceus (Blanford, 1874)
- Firouzophrynus peninsularis (Rao, 1920)
- Firouzophrynus stomaticus (Lütken, 1864)
