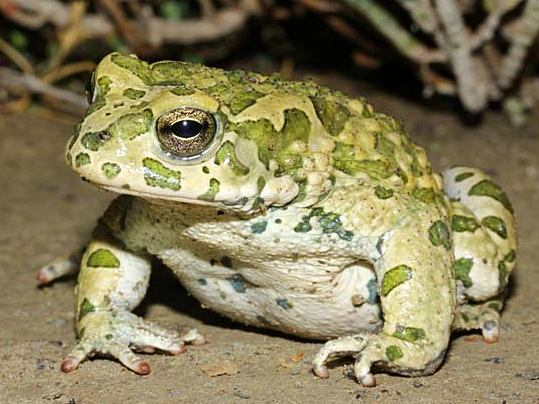

Conservation status
- Least Concern (IUCN 3.1)

Scientific classification
- Kingdom: Animalia
- Phylum: Chordata
- Class: Amphibia
- Order: Anura
- Family: Bufonidae
- Genus: Bufotes
- Species: B. oblongus

Binomial name
- Bufotes oblongus (Nikolsky, 1896)
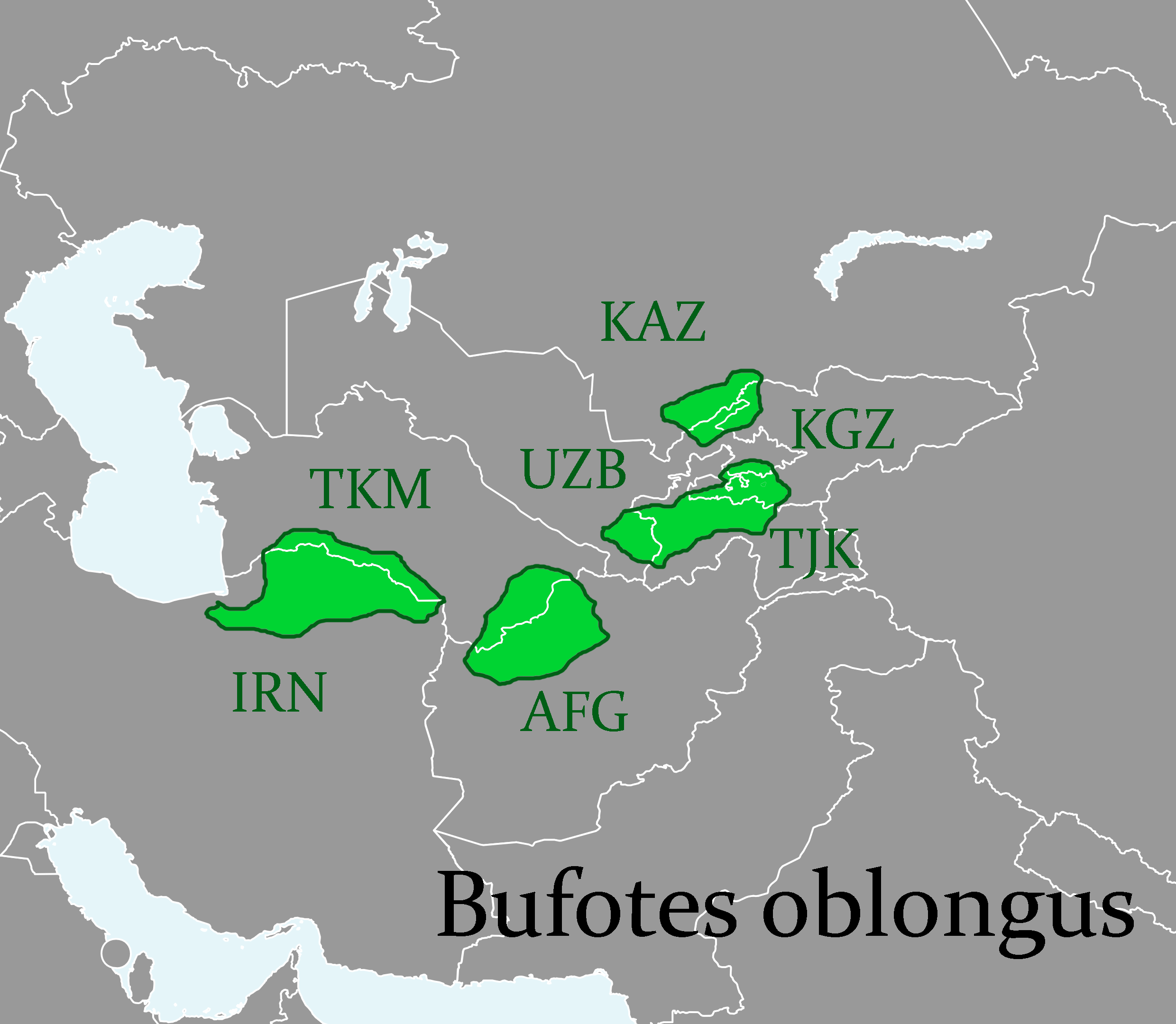

Synonyms
- Bufo danatensis Pisanetz, 1978; Bufo oblongus Nikolsky, 1896; Pseudepidalea oblonga (Nikolsky, 1896)

= Bufotes oblongus =

Species of amphibian

Bufotes oblongus, the Eastern Persian toad or Central Asian toad, is a species of toad in the family Bufonidae. It is found in eastern and central Iran north to adjacent parts of Turkmenistan. Its natural habitats are subtropical or tropical dry shrubland, freshwater marshes, and freshwater springs.
