= List of amphibians of Cyprus =

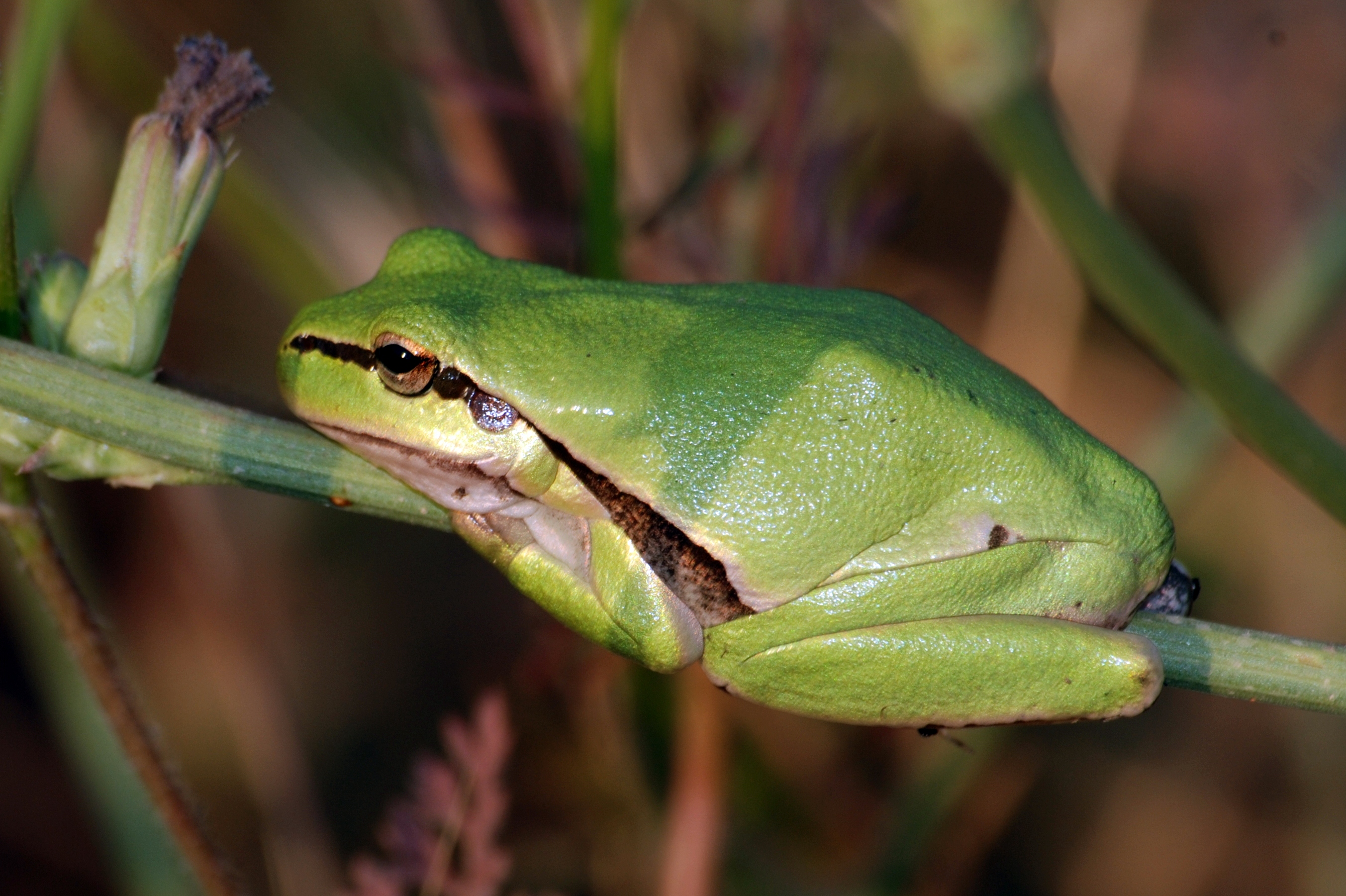
Hyla savignyi, Middle East tree frog

There are three species of amphibians recorded in Cyprus, all of them frogs.

== Frogs and toads ==
Family: Bufonidae

- Bufotes cypriensis Litvinchuk, Mazepa, Jablonski, Dufresnes, 2019 Cyprus Green Toad

Family: Hylidae

- Hyla savignyi (Audouin, 1827) Middle East tree frog

Family: Ranidae

- Pelophylax cypriensis Ploetner, Baier, Akın, Mazepa, Schreiber, Beerli, Litvinchuk, Bilgin, Borkin, Uzzell, 2012 Cyprus water frog (formerly classified as Pelophylax bedriagae Levant water frog)

== See also ==
- Lists of amphibians by region
