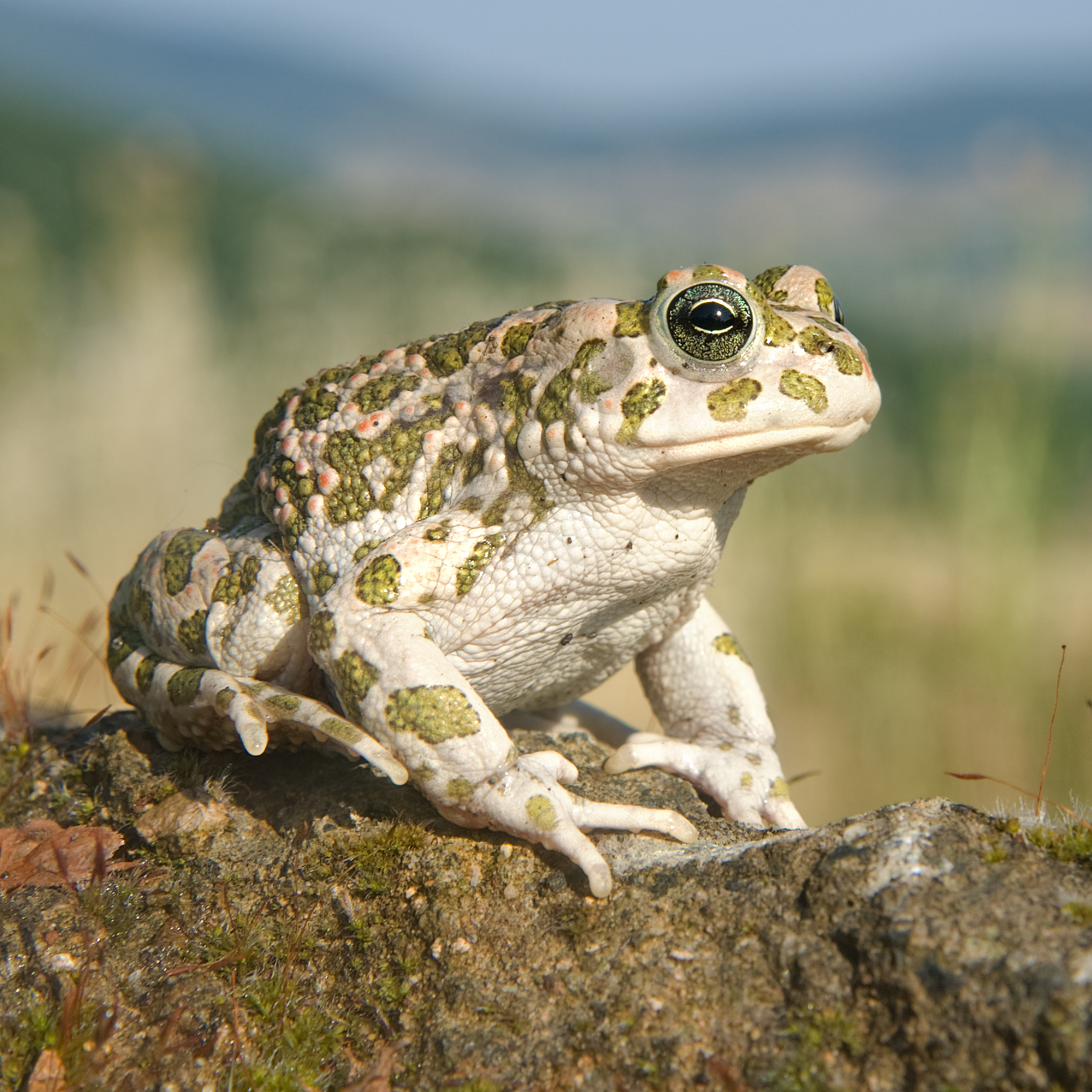
- Balearic green toad (B. balearicus)

Scientific classification
- Kingdom: Animalia
- Phylum: Chordata
- Class: Amphibia
- Order: Anura
- Family: Bufonidae
- Genus: Bufotes; Rafinesque, 1815

Species
- 15, see text

Synonyms
- Pseudepidalea Frost et al., 2006

= Bufotes =

Genus of amphibians

Bufotes, the Eurasian green toads or Palearctic green toads, is a genus of true toads (family Bufonidae). They are native to Europe (absent from the British Isles, most of Fennoscandia, most of France and the Iberian Peninsula), western and central Asia and northern Africa; a region roughly equalling the western and central Palearctic. Historically they were included in the genus Bufo and then for a few years placed in Pseudepidalea, which is a synonym of the currently accepted name Bufotes.

Bufotes are typical toads and as suggested by their common names most—but not all— species and individuals have a distinct greenish-spotted pattern. They occur in a wide range of habitats and mostly lay their eggs in fresh water, but sometimes in waters that are brackish.

== Appearance ==
=== Size and morphology ===
Bufotes are fairly small to medium-large toads with adults that are between about 3.5 and 12 cm (1.4–4.7 in) in snout–to–vent length. The average size varies significantly depending on species, but there is still some overlap between most species when looking at their full size range. Females of a species usually average larger than their males, whereas only males have a vocal sack. In shape and structure, they are typical toads. They have granular and often warty skin. Most have fairly distinct parotoid glands and tympanum. The B. surdus subgroup consists of a couple of Asian species with smaller parotoid glands and a tiny or no tympanum, and they are sometimes called earless toads.

=== Colours ===
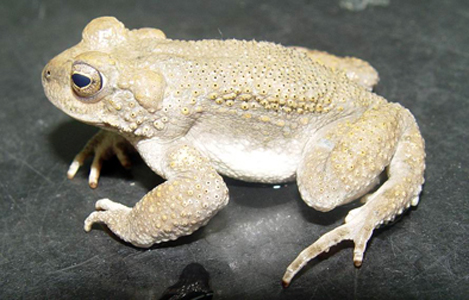
The Iranian earless toad (B. surdus) is a fairly small and plain-coloured species that has no visible tympanum

Most Bufotes species, including all in mainland Europe, have upperparts that are pale to medium brownish, brownish-olive, greyish or cream and with a usually conspicuous pattern of irregularly shaped darker spots that are green or greenish-olive in colour. The spots vary considerably depending on individual; in some they are fairly small and in others they are large; they can be connected, sometimes forming a marbled pattern, or so dense that the toad appears almost all greenish or olive above. Some males can also appear quite uniform greenish or olive above if the base colour and colour of spots are similar; females are almost always more contrastingly marked than males. Depending on species and individual, they can have a thin light yellowish vertebral line, an orangish tinge to the head or fine reddish-orange dots above.

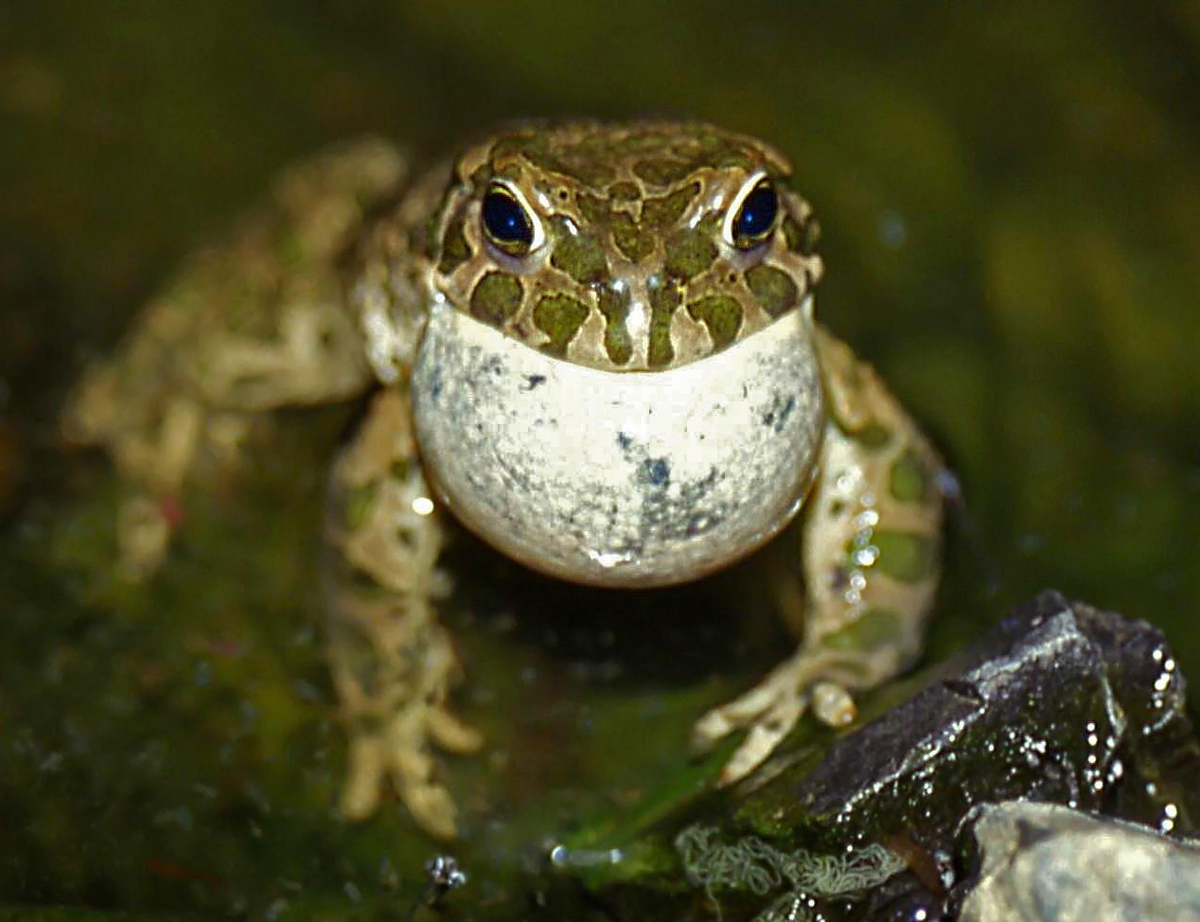
A male European green toad (B. viridis) with a partially distended vocal sack; the usually larger and more colourful females lack a vocal sack

In much of their range, they are the only toads with clear green markings, hence their common name "green toad". In some species, the spots can be blackish or brownish on occasion, and even in species where they are greenish in life, they often become brownish in museum specimens. In some of the species outside Europe, among others B. baturae, B. oblongus, B. pewzowi and B. sitibundus, females usually —but not always— have the typical greenish-spotted pattern, whereas males can have the typical pattern, can be mostly plain with little green (often only greenish spots to their limbs) or plain with no green. In two particularly plain-coloured species, B. luristanicus and B. surdus of Iran and Pakistan, adults of both sexes either lack greenish spots, except sometimes on their limbs, or their greenish spots are small and typically of ring-like shape.

If threatened, they can produce a white skin secretion that has an unpleasant smell.

== Ecology and behavior ==
=== Habitat ===
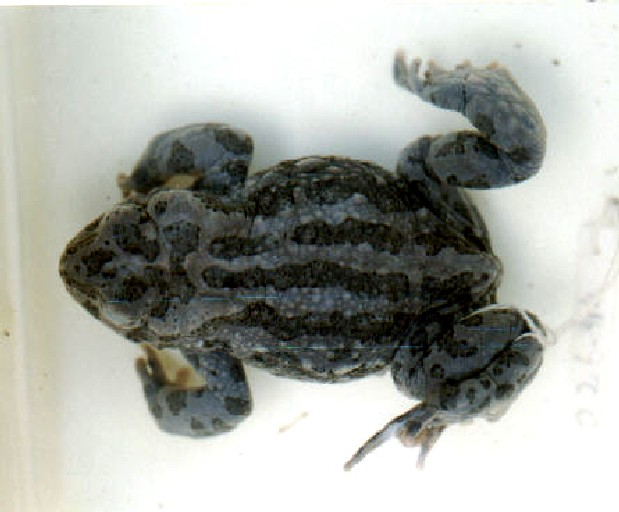
Ladakh toad (B. latastii), a species from the Himalayan highlands

Depending on exact species and region, Bufotes can be found in steppes, grasslands, scrublands, bushlands, sand dunes, deserts, meadows, marshes, gravel pits and forests (however, mostly quite open forests or in openings). In addition to natural habitats, many species will inhabit human modified habitats like cultivated and urban areas, also when quite polluted. Some species may even occur in higher densities in human modified habitats like city parks and gardens than in nearby natural habitats. Most species tend to live in arid to fairly arid habitats, often in places with sandy soils, but there are also species in moist habitats. When the weather is warm and dry, they regularly visit places with water or retreat to damp, hidden locations. In the most arid regions, they are usually restricted to areas near water sources like oases and river valleys, and they may aestivate during the driest periods (in contrast to northern populations that hibernate in winter). They are quite tolerant of high temperatures and only die when they have lost about half their body fluids.

Unusual among amphibians, the adults of some species of Bufotes are not restricted to fresh water, but can also occur in brackish, saline or even hypersaline water as long as any significant change in salinity is gradual (if moved directly from fresh to sea water they usually die).

They can occur from sea level up to at least c. 3,800 m (12,500 ft) in altitude, with many species having a quite wide altitude range, and some central Asian species that are restricted to highlands. One record of B. latastii at 5,238 m (17,185 ft), among the highest for any amphibian, is now considered erroneous.

=== Breeding ===
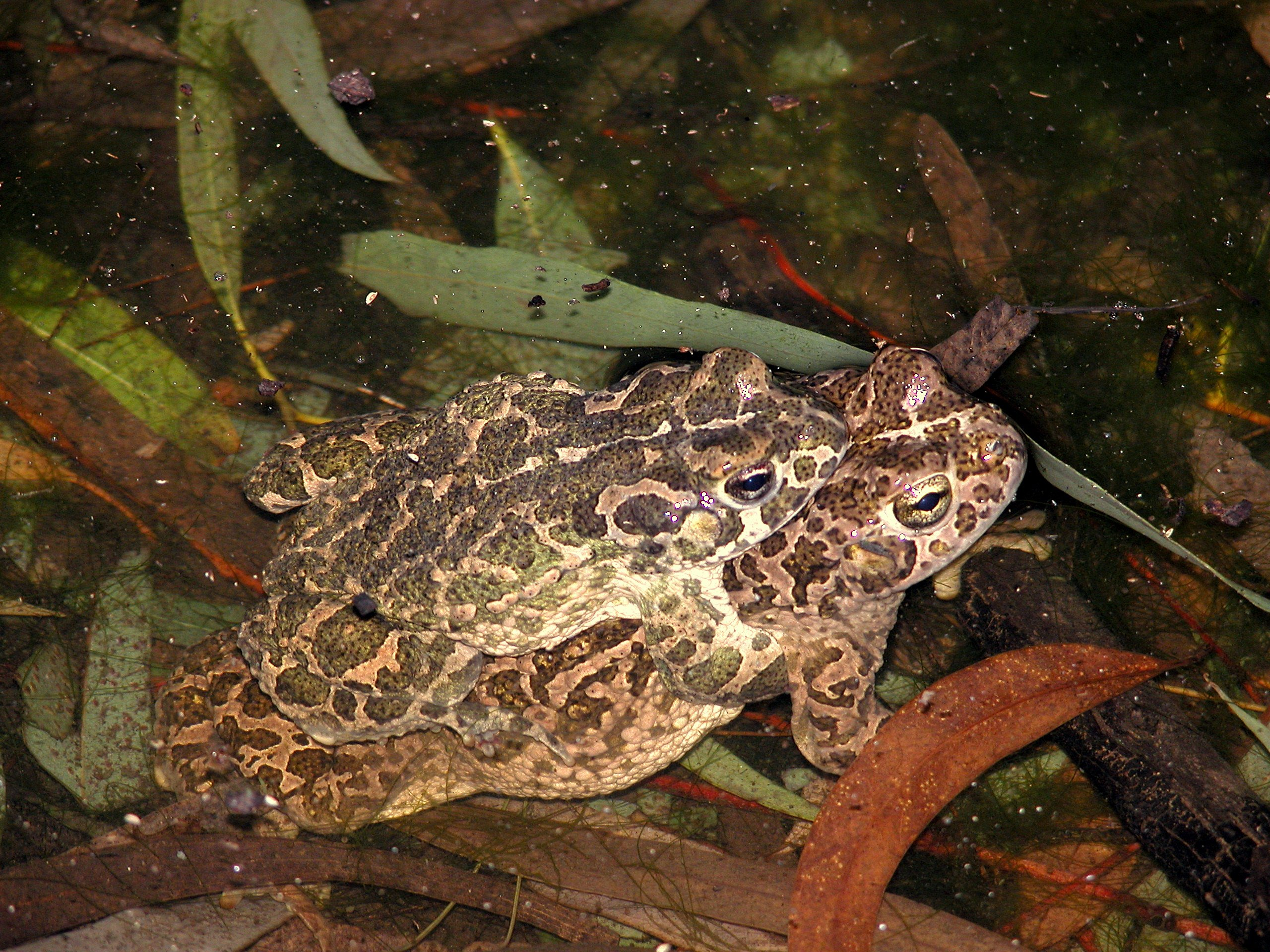
Pair of Sicilian green toads (B. boulengeri siculus) in amplexus

Bufotes are mostly active during twilight and the night, staying hidden during the day, but when breeding they can also be active in the daytime. Breeding is seasonal and the timing and duration varies with species and population; in colder regions it is typically related to higher temperatures (summer) and in warmer, drier regions related to higher rainfall (wet season).

To reach their breeding habitat, they can travel quite long distances, up to 5 km (3 mi) not being unusual. The males gather in groups at the breeding site and call from within or near the water at night. The frequency and pulse of the high-pitched, monotonous trilling call varies with Bufotes species, but in at least some the pulse is also related to temperature, being faster when warmer.

Depending on species, a female can lay from a few hundred to a few tens of thousands black eggs, which are in a long single or double gelatinous and transparent string. They can be deposited in many types of permanent or temporary waters like lakes, ponds, puddles, swamps, rivers, streams, torrents, reservoirs and ditches, but usually in places no more than 50 cm (1.6 ft) deep. As in the adults, the eggs and tadpoles of some species are quite tolerant of higher salinities, and breeding can occur even in brackish or low saline water. The eggs and tadpoles are sensitive to polluted waters. They are also negatively affected by competition from common toad tadpoles and vulnerable to predation by fish (more so than the unpalatable common toad tadpoles). The tadpoles feed on various plant matter and detritus, along with small quantities of zooplanktonic organisms, but after metamorphosis into toadlets they shift to a diet composed of small invertebrates.

== Conservation and awareness ==
International Toad Day is held annually on May 15 to promote awareness of toads and their conservation. The initiative began in Israel in 2026 and has since been presented internationally.

== Taxonomy ==
=== Genus ===
The taxonomy of this group has caused considerable confusion. Species placed in Bufotes essentially equals the historically recognised viridis (green toad) species group of the genus Bufo, although various other distantly species sometimes also were included in the group. In 2006, a major review revealed that this group should be moved out of Bufo into their own genus, Pseudepidalea. In 2010, it was shown that Pseudepidalea is a junior synonym of Bufotes. Shortly after, the divergent Brongersma's toad and Mongolian toad were moved to their own genera as Barbarophryne brongersmai and Strauchbufo raddei respectively.

=== Species, ploidy and hybridisation ===
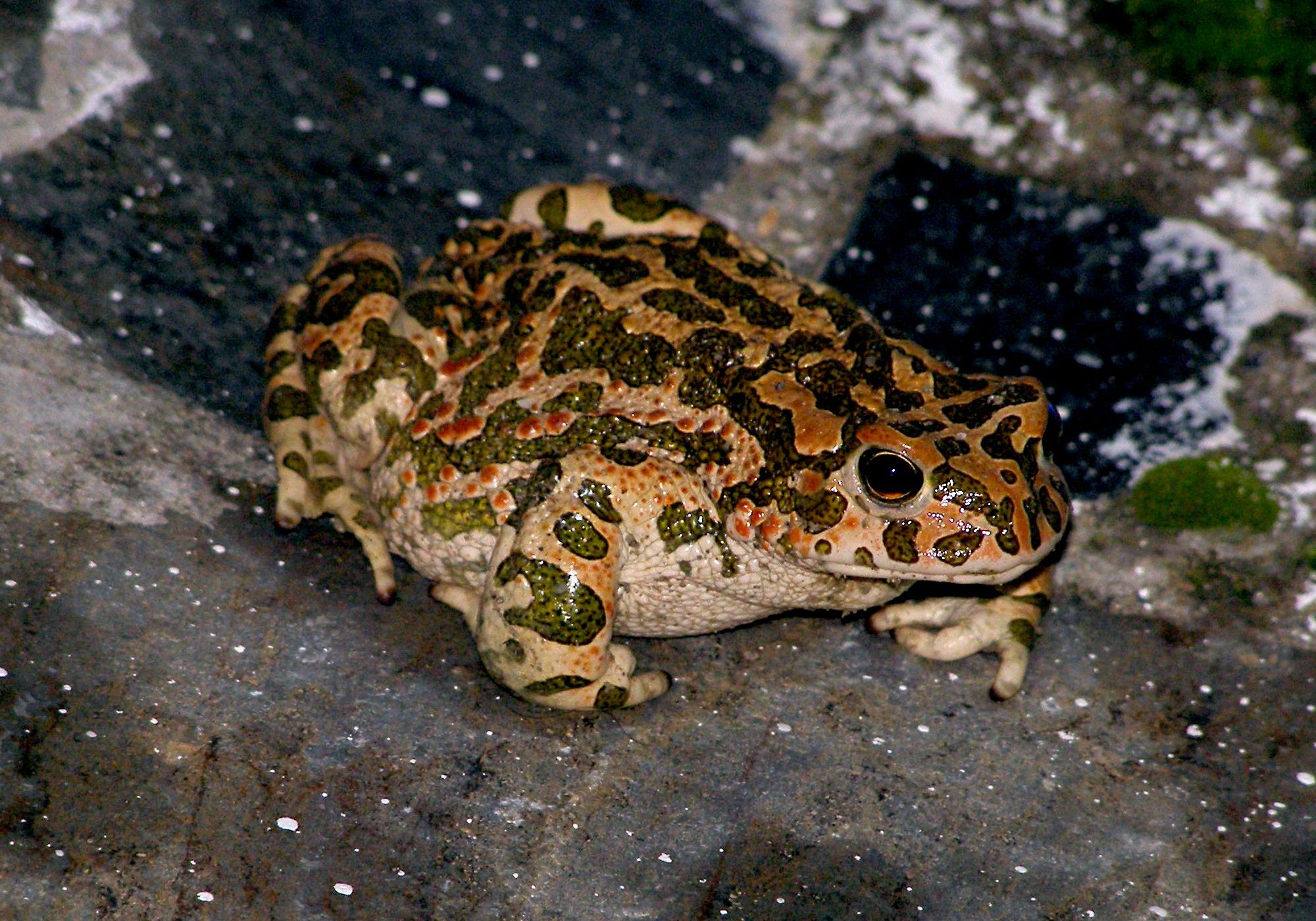
The Cretan population is tentatively included in the European green toad (B. viridis), but its taxonomic position requires further study.

Although several species or variants were described more than a century ago, most were generally included in Bufotes (then Bufo) viridis until quite recently. In a major review of Eurasian toads in 1972, only the widespread B. viridis and three more restricted Asian species were recognised in this group, but also including the Mongolian toad and natterjack toad, two species now known to be quite distantly related. In the following years, it became clear that this was an unsatisfactory taxonomy, as there were major variations in both morphology and ploidy. Starting in the late 1990s, several reviews have been published and the number of recognised species has slowly increased as a result of revalidation of earlier described species and the description of new; most of these were formerly considered part of B. viridis. A few populations, especially those on Crete and certain Cyclades Islands, still require further study to clarify their taxonomic position.

While the European, northern African and western Asian species all are diploid, central Asia has species that are diploid (B. latastii, B. perrini, B. sitibundus and B. turanensis), triploid (B. baturae, B. pseudoraddei and B. zugmayeri) and tetraploid (B. oblongus and B. pewzowi). Despite differences in ploidy, hybridisation is still possible between some of them, and the three triploids and two tetraploids are the result of hybrid speciation where the original parents were two diploid species. The three central Asian species B. baturae, B. pseudoraddei and B. zugmayeri are highly unusual in that they are entirely triploid in both sexes and reproduce sexually; all other known animal triploids are infertile, unisexual that reproduce through parthenogenesis, gynogenesis or hybridogenesis, or require varying ploidy (for example, both diploid individuals and triploid individuals) within the species to breed.

The widespread hybridisation, both ancient and today, has also caused taxonomic problems among the diploid species. For example, in 2006, based on similarities in mitochondrial DNA, the population in northern Europe (northernmost Germany, Denmark and southern Sweden) was placed together with the populations from far southeastern Europe (southern Balkan and Cyprus) and parts of Asia (Anatolia and the Levant to Iran and central Asia) as the species B. variabilis. In between these widely disjunct populations of B. variabilis was B. viridis. This was highly unusual from a zoogeographic point of view and in 2019 a more comprehensive study found that the north European population is part of B. viridis, the population of southern Balkan and adjacent parts of Anatolia is a hybrid zone between B. viridis and B. sitibundus, the Cyprus population is its own species B. cypriensis, and those of most of Anatolia and the Levant to Iran and central Asia are B. sitibundus. Since the type locality of B. variabilis is in Lübeck (Germany), the name is a synonym of B. viridis. Earlier studies had been misled by primarily looking at mitochondrial DNA, which can be unreliable in species where there has been historical hybridisation. Despite a relatively deep divergence between the species and their mostly allopatric or parapatric distributions (however, in Asia there are locations where as many three species occur together), hybridisation still occurs between some that come into contact today. For example, B. sitibundus and B. viridis have a broad hybrid zone in eastern Europe (mostly southern Balkan and European Russia) and western Anatolia, B. balearicus and B. viridis have a relatively narrow hybrid zone in the region of far northeastern Italy, and B. balearicus and B. boulengeri siculus only have very marginal hybridisation in eastern Sicily.

Interbreeding between Bufotes species and toads of other genera, including the common toad (Bufo bufo) and natterjack toad (Epidalea calamita), is usually rare, but very locally it can be more frequent. The intergeneric hybrid offspring often has a high mortality rate and if reaching maturity it is presumed that their reproductive ability is low or none. They typically only occur under unusual circumstances, like places where both parent species have very small and isolated populations (limiting their chance if finding a partner of their own species), where species that typically are segregated by habitat or breeding ecology meet, or in captivity.

=== Species list ===
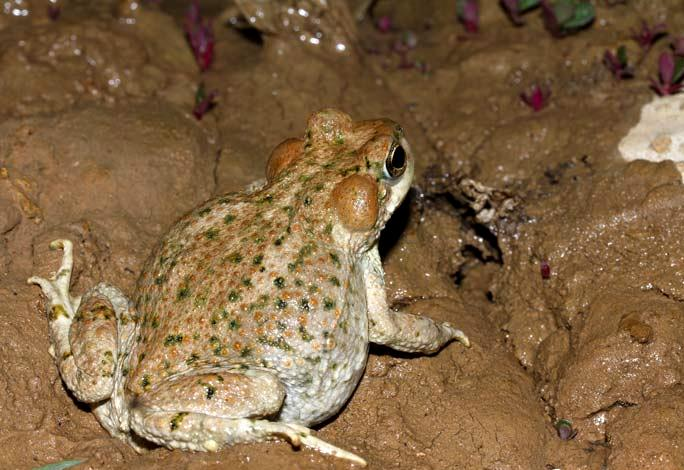
Lorestan toad (B. luristanicus), endemic to Iran

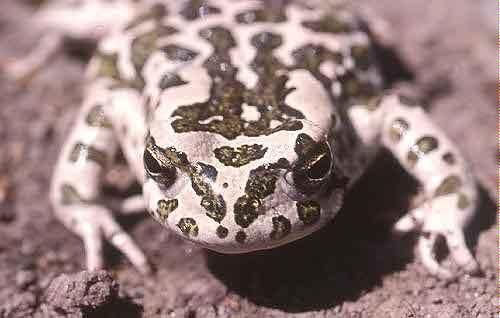
Cyprus green toad (B. cypriensis), a fairly small species that only was scientifically described in 2019

There are currently 15 recognised species in the genus Bufotes. Within their range, each of the green-coloured species is often just called "green toad", but this can lead to confusion with distantly related species like the North American green toad (Anaxyrus debilis).

- Balearic green toad, Bufotes balearicus (Boettger, 1880)
- Batura toad, Bufotes baturae (Stöck, Schmid, Steinlein & Grosse, 1999)
- African green toad, Bufotes boulengeri (Lataste, 1879)
  - Sicilian green toad, Bufotes boulengeri siculus (Stöck et al., 2008)
- Cyprus green toad, Bufotes cypriensis (Litvinchuk et al., 2019)
- Ladakh (or Baltistan) toad, Bufotes latastii (Boulenger, 1882)
- Lorestan earless toad, Bufotes luristanicus (Schmidt, 1952)
- Eastern Persian toad, Bufotes oblongus (Nikolskii, 1896)
- Perrin's green toad, Bufotes perrini (Mazepa et al., 2019)
- Pewzow's toad, Bufotes pewzowi (Bedriaga, 1898)
- Swat (or Batura) green toad, Bufotes pseudoraddei (Mertens, 1971)
- Variable green toad, Bufotes sitibundus (Pallas, 1771)
- Iranian earless toad, Bufotes surdus (Boulenger, 1891)
- Turan toad, Bufotes turanensis (Hemmer, Schmidtler & Böhme, 1978)
- European green toad, Bufotes viridis (Laurenti, 1768)
- Baloch green toad, Bufotes zugmayeri (Eiselt & Schmidtler, 1973)
