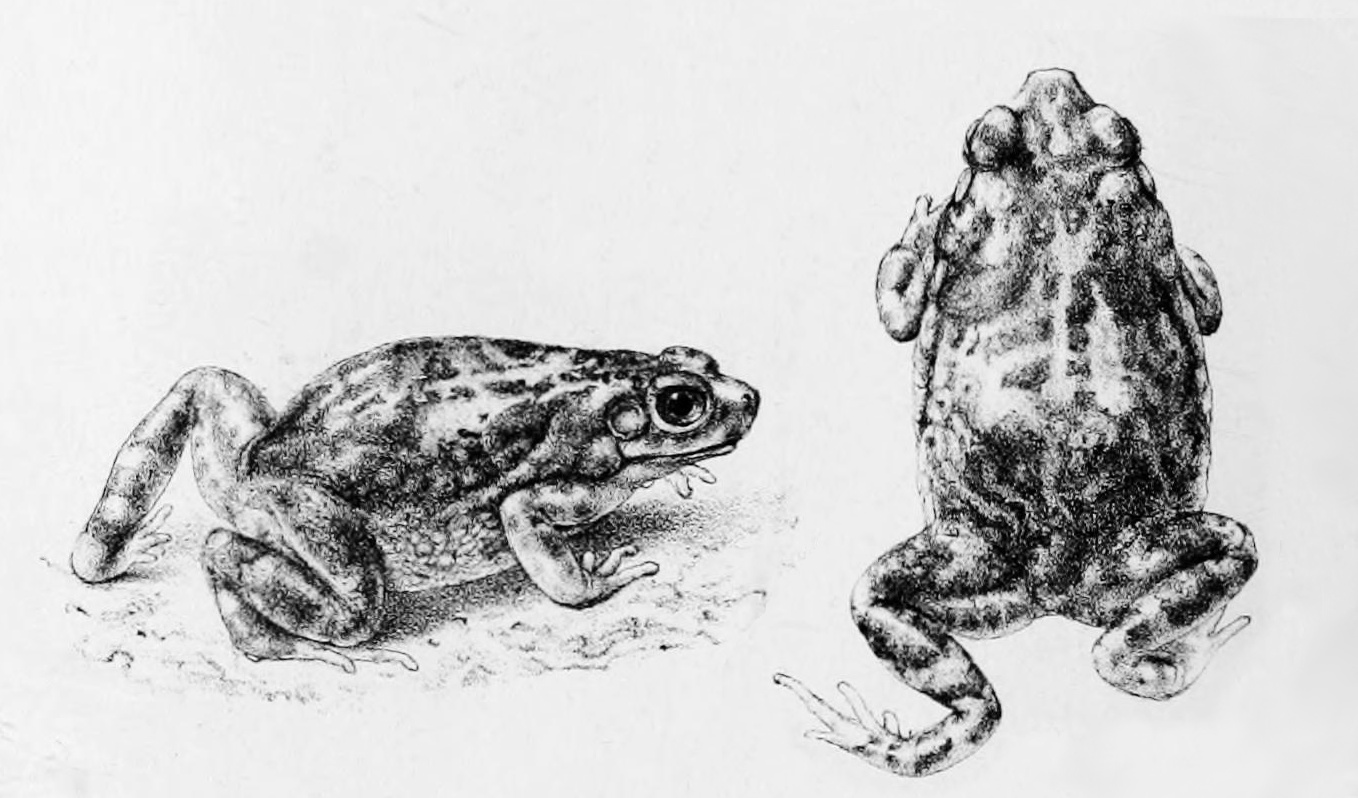

Conservation status
- Data Deficient (IUCN 3.1)

Scientific classification
- Kingdom: Animalia
- Phylum: Chordata
- Class: Amphibia
- Order: Anura
- Family: Bufonidae
- Genus: Firouzophrynus
- Species: F. hololius

Binomial name
- Firouzophrynus hololius (Günther, 1876)

Synonyms
- Bufo holoius Duttaphrynus holoius

= Firouzophrynus hololius =

Species of amphibian

Firouzophrynus hololius, known as Günther's toad, Malabar toad, or rock toad, is an uncommon, rock-dwelling toad found in the Eastern Ghats and Deccan plateau of peninsular India.

== Description ==
The crown of this toad lacks bony ridges and has a short, prominent snout. Its inter-orbital space as broad and the upper eyelid; tympanum very distinct, nearly as large as the eye and close to it. Fingers short, first extending a little beyond second; toes short, webbed at the base only; subarticular tubercles single, not very prominent; two small metatarsal tubercles; no tarsal fold. The tarso-metatarsal articulation reaches the eye. Skin smooth, the back with very flat, smooth, distinctly porous glandular patches; parotoids flat. Olive above, marbled with brown: beneath immaculate. From snout to vent about 2 inches.

== Distribution ==
This toad is known from rocky hillocks and outcrops of Bangalore in Karnataka, Hosur, Gingee and Javadi Hills in Tamil Nadu, Chittoor, Nellore, Visakhapatnam and Nagarjuna Sagar Dam in Andhra Pradesh and Telangana. (It was previously mistaken to be found in the Western Ghats).

== Natural history ==
This uncommon species of toad is very partial to rocky habitats; being only found in places with predominantly rocky substrate and boulder formations. Thought to be nocturnal and insectivorous; and to become active during the rains. Breeds by laying eggs in stagnant ephemeral pools and ponds formed only on rocky surfaces, but not on soil layers. Tadpoles develop in ephemeral pools on rock scapes. Young ones are very bright replicas of the adults; sporting vivid scarlet red spots on body. Its depressed body form may indicate a life suited for rock-dwelling habits.

The threats are not exactly known but habitat loss is possible; it also occurs in Nagarjunsagar-Srisailam Tiger Reserve and possibly but needing verification Bannerghatta National Park. It has a fragmented and declining population and there were no recent records until 2009, when it was re-sighted in the Hosur Forest Division. Following this work more sightings turned out subsequently from Thommaguddai, Ambur Range, Tiruppattur, Vellore and it was seen three more times in 2012.
