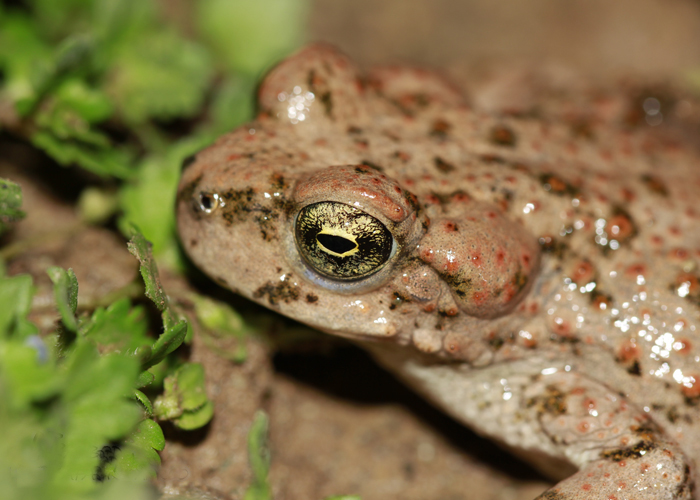

Conservation status
- Least Concern (IUCN 3.1)

Scientific classification
- Kingdom: Animalia
- Phylum: Chordata
- Class: Amphibia
- Order: Anura
- Family: Bufonidae
- Genus: Bufotes
- Species: B. luristanicus

Binomial name
- Bufotes luristanicus (Schmidt, 1952)

Synonyms
- Bufo luristanicus; Pseudepidalea luristanica

= Bufotes luristanicus =

Species of amphibian

Bufotes luristanicus, the Lorestan earless toad or Lorestan toad (not to be confused with Luristan toad), is a species of toad in the family Bufonidae. It is endemic to the Zagros Mountains in Iran and occurs at an altitude of 350–1,300 m (1,150–4,270 ft), most often near rocky outcrops or freshwater ponds, which it also uses for breeding. Little is known about this species, but it is not considered threatened overall. Some local populations may be threatened by habitat loss from human activities or drought.

Adult B. luristanicus have a snout–to–vent length of c. 3.5–7 cm (1.4–2.8 in). It resembles its close relative B. surdus (Luristan (earless) toad). Both are relatively small, dull-coloured and with no or a tiny tympanum. Unlike most Bufotes species, the adults never have large and conspicuous green spots to the upperpart of their body. They have no greenish spots at all, except sometimes on their limbs, or small and often ring-shaped spots. In juveniles, the spots are relatively larger.
