= Firouzophrynus peninsularis =

Conservation status
- Least Concern (IUCN 3.1)

Scientific classification
- Kingdom: Animalia
- Phylum: Chordata
- Class: Amphibia
- Order: Anura
- Family: Bufonidae
- Genus: Firouzophrynus
- Species: F. peninsularis

Binomial name
- Firouzophrynus peninsularis (Rao, 1920)

Synonyms
- Bufo stomaticus peninsularis Rao, 1920; Duttaphrynus peninsularis (Rao, 1920)

Species of toad

Firouzophrynus peninsularis, the peninsular toad or peninsular true toad, is a species of toad in the family Bufonidae. It lives in India.

== Habitat ==
This frog spends most of its time in forests and wetlands, though it has been found in urban areas as well. This frog can live in some types of secondary forest, but it does require closed-canopy environments. Scientists saw the frog between 0 and 1000 meters above sea level.

== Threats ==
Scientists from the IUCN classify this frog as least concern of extinction. What threat it faces comes from habitat loss associated with agriculture and infrastructure and from pollution.

== Scientific description ==
- Bisht K; Garg S; Sarmah ANDA; Sengupta S; Biju SD (2021). "Lost, forgotten, and overlooked: Systematic reassessment of two lesser-known toad species (Anura: Bufonidae) from Peninsular India and another wide-ranging northern species". Zoosystematics and Evolution. 97 (2): 451–470.
