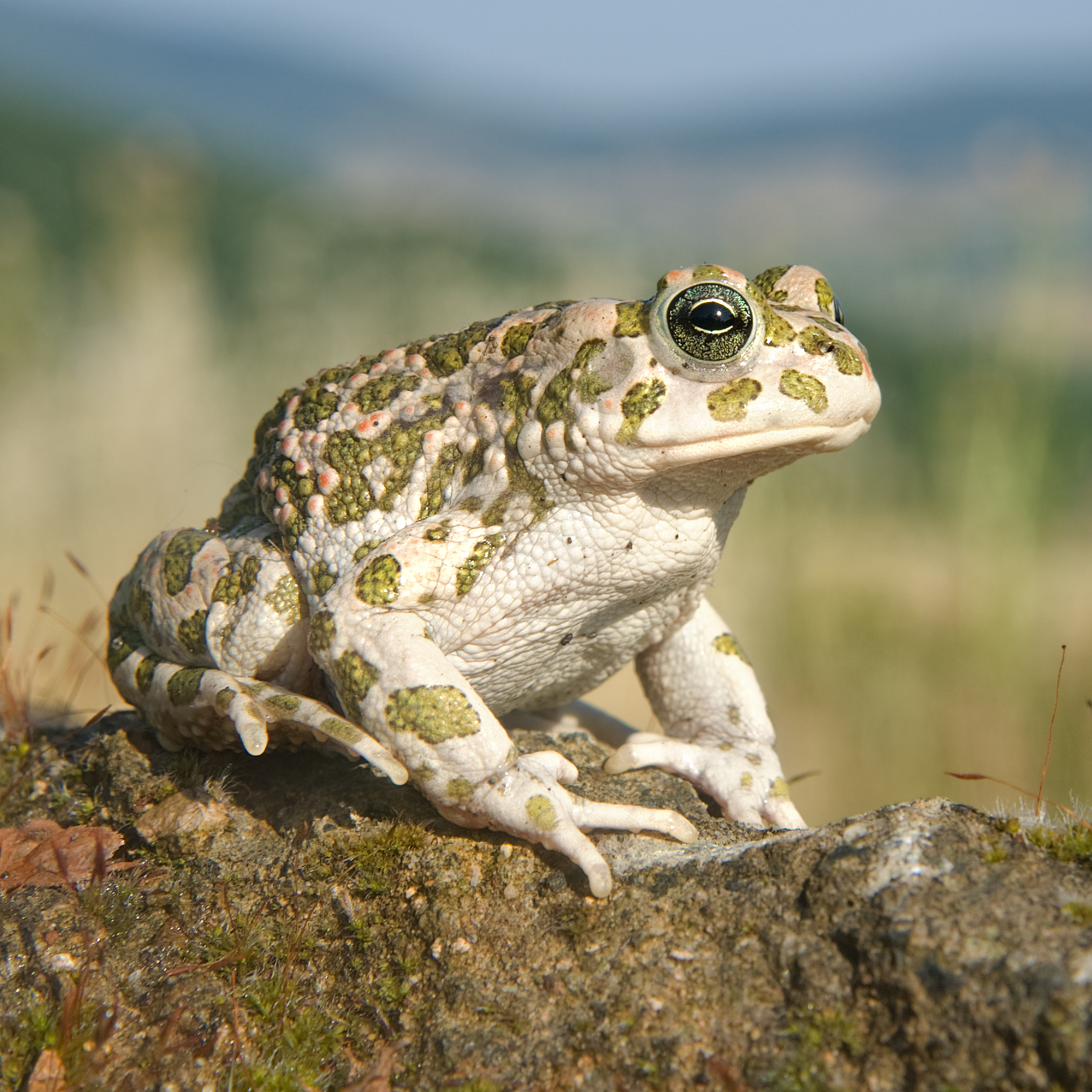

Conservation status
- Least Concern (IUCN 3.1)

Scientific classification
- Kingdom: Animalia
- Phylum: Chordata
- Class: Amphibia
- Order: Anura
- Family: Bufonidae
- Genus: Bufotes
- Species: B. balearicus

Binomial name
- Bufotes balearicus (Boettger, 1880)
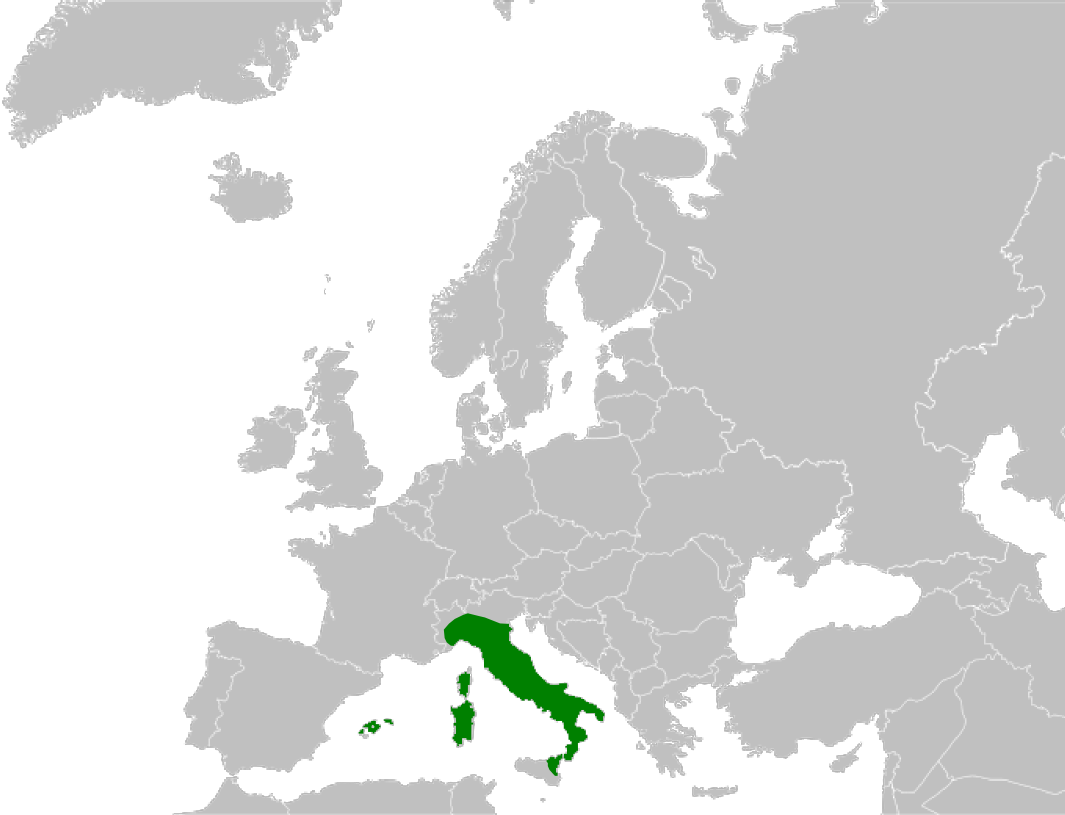

Synonyms
- Bufo balearicus Boettger, 1880; Bufo variabilis var. balearica Boettger, 1880; Bufo viridis balearicus Boettger, 1880; Pseudepidalea balearica (Boettger, 1880)

= Balearic green toad =

Species of amphibian

The Balearic green toad (Bufotes balearicus) is a species of anuran, a toad, belonging to the true toad family, Bufonidae, from Italy and islands in the western Mediterranean Sea. It is mostly a lowland species, but can be found as high as 1,300 m (4,300 ft) above sea level in central Italy.

== Distribution ==
The Balearic green toad, despite its name, is native to Italy (where it is present on all territories except for the extreme north-east, south-east and south-west) and Corsica. This species appears to have been introduced, either accidentally or deliberately, to the Balearic Islands from Sardinia and Corsica, probably in the Bronze Age. The Balearic population is still common, but declining. It formerly extended into Switzerland and there have been (so far) unsuccessful reintroduction attempts in that country. Its range meets that of the similar and closely related European green toad (B. viridis) in far northeastern Italy and that of the Sicilian green toad (B. boulengeri siculus) in easternmost Sicily.

== Taxonomy and appearance ==
Specimen in San Vincenzo, Tuscany, calling

The Balearic green toad was first formally described in 1880 as Bufo variabilis Pall. var. balearica by Oskar Boettger with its type locality given as the Balearic islands of Menorca and Mallorca. Once considered the same as the European green toad, molecular genetic data now firmly support its status as a separate species. There is some hybridization where their ranges come into contact; hybridization with the Sicilian green toad is extremely limited. The three species are very similar, but the Balearic green toad has paratoid glands with brownish or reddish spots.
