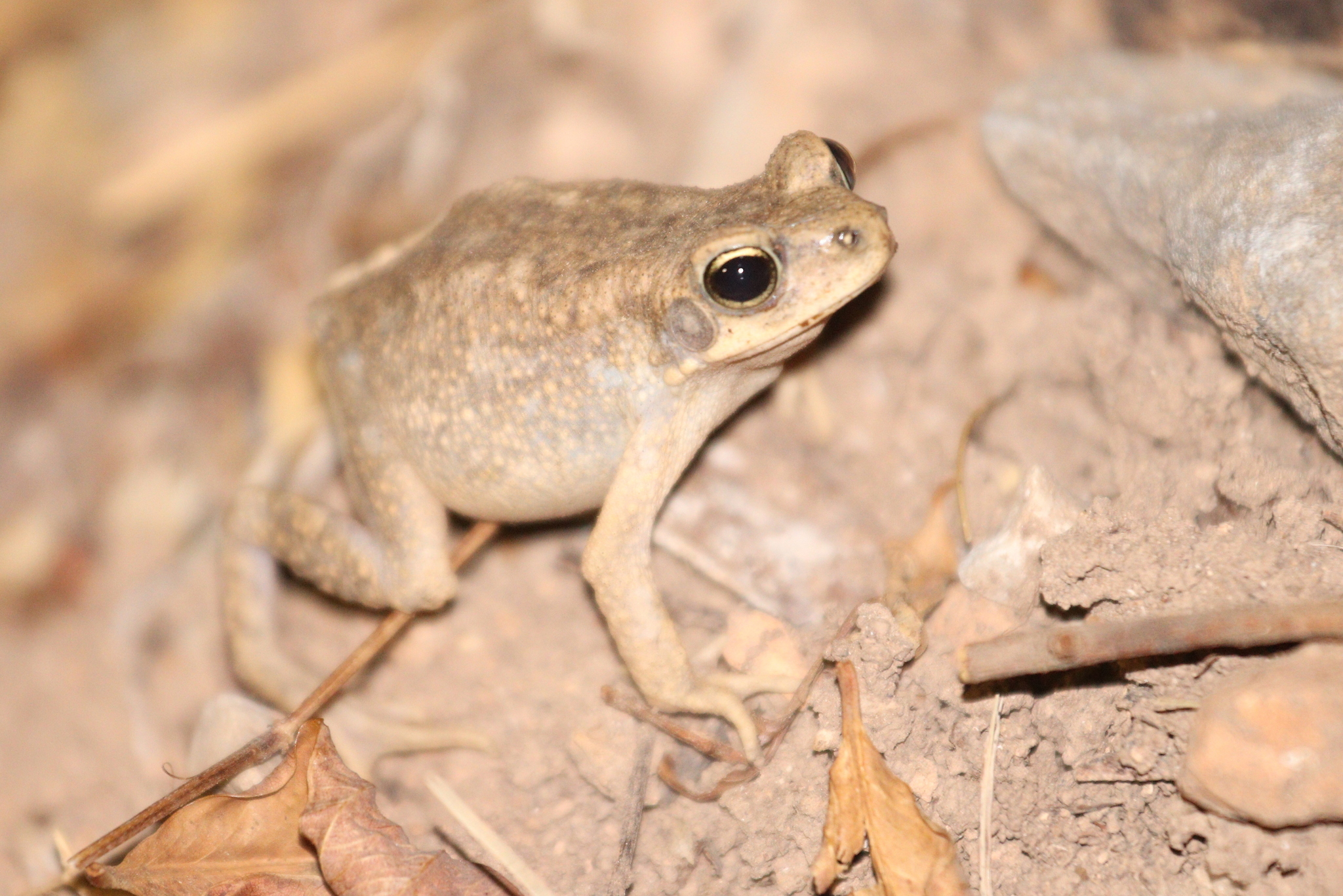

Conservation status
- Least Concern (IUCN 3.1)

Scientific classification
- Kingdom: Animalia
- Phylum: Chordata
- Class: Amphibia
- Order: Anura
- Family: Bufonidae
- Genus: Firouzophrynus
- Species: F. dhufarensis

Binomial name
- Firouzophrynus dhufarensis (Parker, 1931)

Synonyms
- Bufo dhufarensis Duttaphrynus dhufarensis

= Dhofar toad =

Species of amphibian

The Dhofar toad or Oman toad (Firouzophrynus dhufarensis) is a species of toad in the family Bufonidae. It is endemic to the Arabian Peninsula and is found in Oman, Saudi Arabia, the United Arab Emirates, and Yemen.

== Description ==
The Dhofar toad is a small and highly variable species, ranging from greenish to various shades of brown, and it may appear either plain in colour or patterned with darker mottling and speckles. The tympanum, just behind and below the bulging eyes, is large, which contrasts with the Arabian toad, the only other amphibian with which it is likely to be confused, which has a small tympanum. The call of the male at breeding time is a sharp "kra-kra-kra", and this contrasts with the "rusty hinge" sound made by the Arabian toad. The latter is less likely to be found far away from water bodies.

== Distribution and habitat ==
One of only nine species of amphibian in the Arabian Peninsula, the Dhofar toad is found in Yemen, Oman, Saudi Arabia and the United Arab Emirates. It is also present on the Farasan Islands and other islands, and its altitudinal range is from sea level up to about 2,000 m (6,600 ft). Its typical habitat is wet places, springs, pools, streams, canals, ditches, irrigated land, gardens and oases, but it is sometimes found far from any permanent water.

== Biology ==
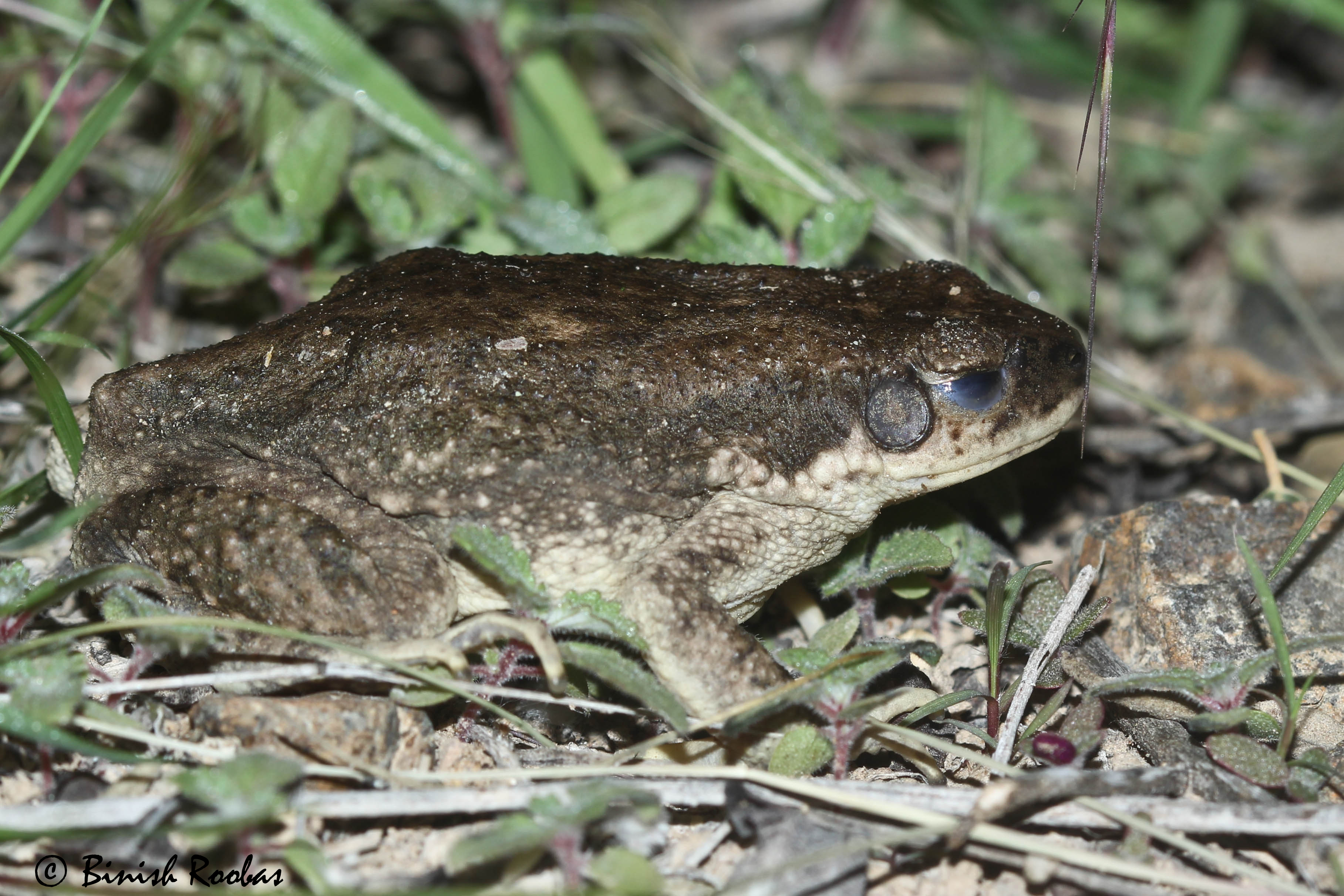
Dhofar toad from Wadi Wurrayah National Park

This toad is largely nocturnal and feeds mostly on insects. It reacts to drought conditions by burying itself in the ground and aestivating, which it has been known to do for up to three years. When heavy rain falls, it emerges to feed and makes its way to nearby water bodies where the males call to attract the females. The eggs are laid in strings and the tadpoles develop with great rapidity before the ephemeral water sources dry up.

== Status ==
The International Union for Conservation of Nature has assessed this toad's conservation status as being of "least concern" on the basis of its "wide distribution, tolerance of a degree of habitat modification, presumed large population, and because it is unlikely to be declining fast enough to qualify for listing in a more threatened category."
