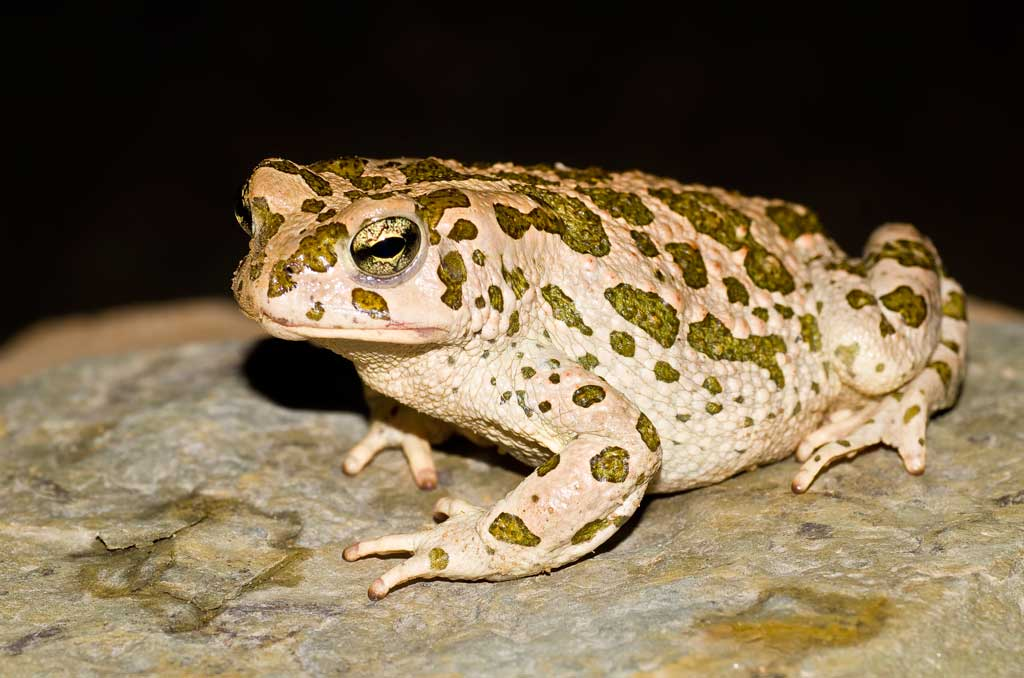

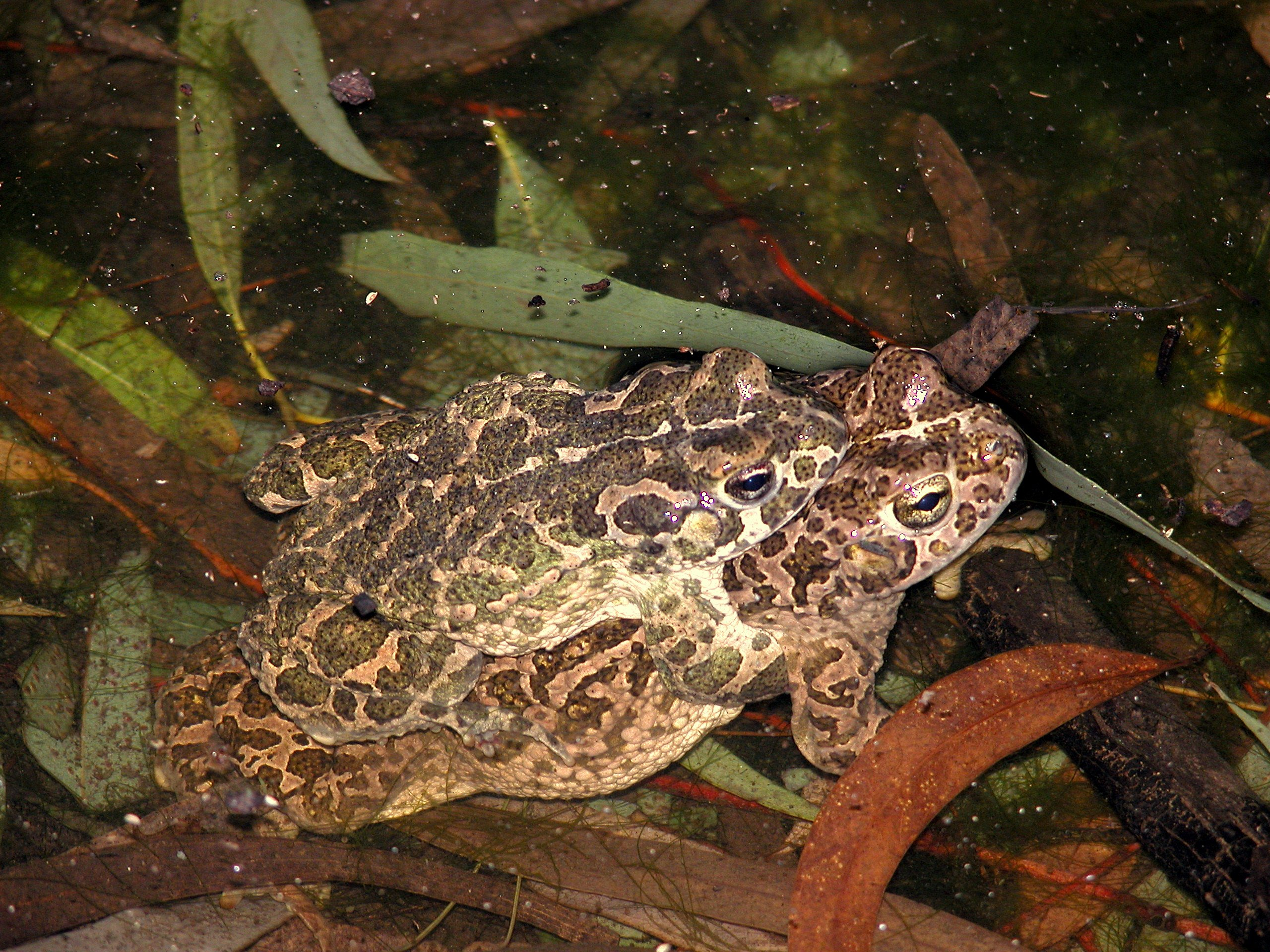
- B. b. boulengeri above, B. b. siculus below

Conservation status
- Least Concern (IUCN 3.1)

Scientific classification
- Kingdom: Animalia
- Phylum: Chordata
- Class: Amphibia
- Order: Anura
- Family: Bufonidae
- Genus: Bufotes
- Species: B. boulengeri

Binomial name
- Bufotes boulengeri (Lataste, 1879)
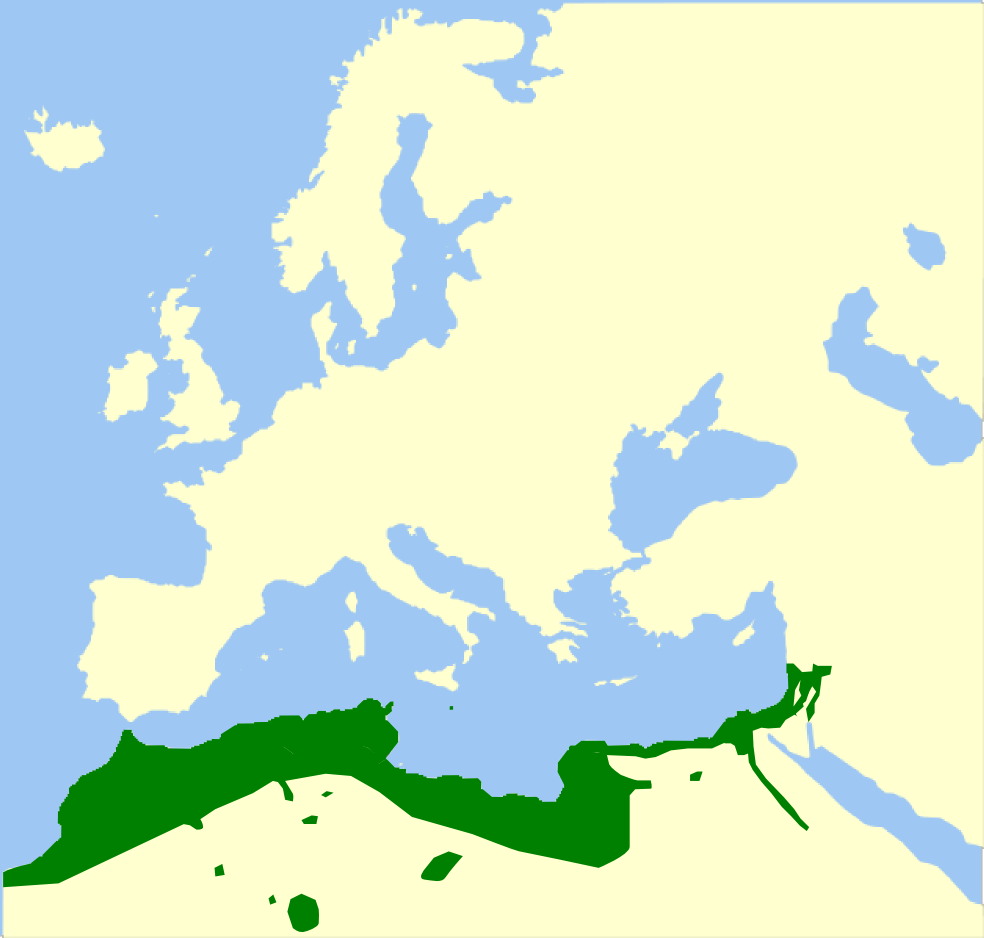
- Range of African green toad, but lacking the populations on Italian islands, and incorrectly including Sinai and the Levant

Synonyms
- Bufo boulengeri Lataste, 1879; Pseudepidalea boulengeri (Lataste, 1879); Bufo siculus Stöck et al 2008; Bufotes siculus (Stöck et al 2008); Pseudepidalea sicula (Stöck et al 2008)

= African green toad =

Species of amphibian

The African green toad (Bufotes boulengeri) is a species of toad found in North Africa from Morocco to Egypt, and on the Italian islands of Sicily, Favignana, Lampedusa and Ustica. The populations on the Italian islands were described as a separate species, the Sicilian green toad (B. siculus), in 2008, but more recent authorities treat it as a subspecies of the African green toad because they are very closely related. Both were historically included in the European green toad (B. viridis) and all have been included in the genus Bufo. It was previously suggested that the African green toad might range east into Sinai and the Levant, but a review has shown that this involves the related B. sitibundus. The African green toad is found from coastal areas to highland plateaus in forests, scrubland, grassland, semi-deserts and deserts; it breeds in temporary ponds and similar habitats.

In both size and colouration, the African green toad resembles other members of the genus Bufotes, including the European green toad and the Balearic green toad (B. balearicus). The range of the African and Balearic green toads approach each other in easternmost Sicily; only the latter species has coloured spots on the paratoid glands and some reddish-orange markings. The two subspecies of the African green toad very closely resemble each other; the North African B. b. boulengeri may differ from the Sicilian B. b. siculus by its dorsal stripe.

The African green toad was first formally described as Bufo boulengeri in 1879 by the French zoologist Fernand Lataste with its type locality given as Algeria.
