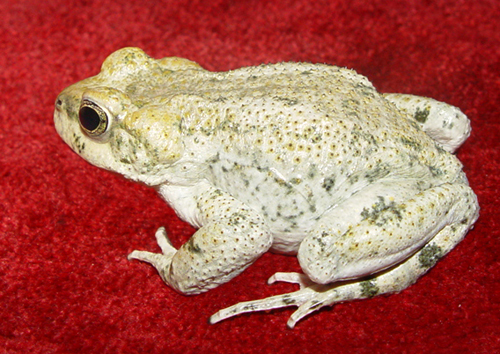

Conservation status
- Least Concern (IUCN 3.1)

Scientific classification
- Kingdom: Animalia
- Phylum: Chordata
- Class: Amphibia
- Order: Anura
- Family: Bufonidae
- Genus: Bufotes
- Species: B. surdus

Binomial name
- Bufotes surdus (Boulenger, 1891)

Synonyms
- Bufo persicus Steindachner, 1867; Bufo surdus Boulenger, 1891; Bufo viridis var. persica Nikolskii, 1900 "1899"; Bufo persicus Nikolskii, 1904; Pseudepidalea surda (Boulenger, 1891)

= Bufotes surdus =

Species of amphibian

Bufotes surdus, also known as Iranian earless toad, Iranian toad, Pakistan toad, or Luristan toad (not to be confused with Lorestan toad), is a species of toad in the family Bufonidae. It is found in southern Iran and western Pakistan. There is also an isolated record from eastern Iraq.

== Appearance and subspecies ==
Bufotes surdus is a medium-small toad with a snout–to–vent length of about 4–6 cm (1.6–2.4 in) in adults. Unlike most species of Bufotes but similar to its close relative B. luristanicus, it has no visible tympanum (either absent or tiny and covered by the skin), hence the common name "earless toad". It is typically quite dull and plain-coloured, but it may have some inconspicuous greenish markings, especially to the limbs, and occasionally a larger amount of small greenish ring-shaped spots.

Two subspecies are recognized, but their separation is questionable (annulatus was described based on features that often are individually variable in toads) and require further study.

- Bufotes surdus annulatus (Schmidtler and Schmidtler, 1969)
- Bufotes surdus surdus (Boulenger, 1891)

Common name ring-spotted earless toad can be used to specifically refer to Bufotes surdus annulatus.

== Habitat and conservation ==
Bufotes surdus inhabits oases and pools in irrigated areas and their surroundings at elevations of 0–2,250 m (0–7,382 ft) above sea level. Breeding takes place during the monsoons when males gather in temporal pools. The eggs are deposited around vegetation in ponds. During the dry season these animals seek damp areas under stones and within vegetation. It can be a locally common species, but its ecology is little known and it has sometimes been confused with juveniles of other Bufotes species. It is threatened by intensification of agriculture, including agricultural pollution. Extended periods of drought can cause local population declines. Some populations occur within protected areas.
