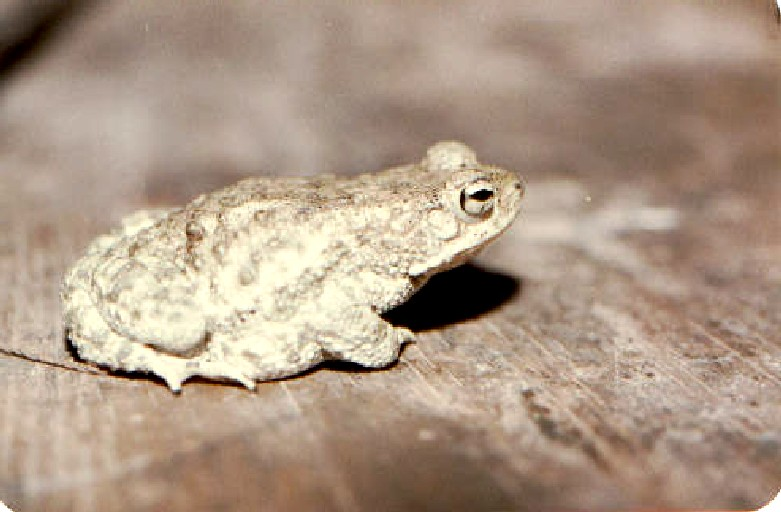

Conservation status
- Least Concern (IUCN 3.1)

Scientific classification
- Kingdom: Animalia
- Phylum: Chordata
- Class: Amphibia
- Order: Anura
- Family: Bufonidae
- Genus: Firouzophrynus
- Species: F. stomaticus

Binomial name
- Firouzophrynus stomaticus (Lütken, 1864)

Synonyms
- Bufo stomaticus Lütken, 1864; Bufo andersonii Boulenger, 1883; Bufo Andersonii Murray, 1884; Duttaphrynus stomaticus (Lütken, 1864)

= Firouzophrynus stomaticus =

Species of amphibian

Firouzophrynus stomaticus, also known as the Indian marbled toad, Punjab toad, Indus Valley toad, or marbled toad, is a species of toad found in Asia from eastern Iran, Pakistan, Afghanistan to Nepal, extending into Peninsular India and Bangladesh.

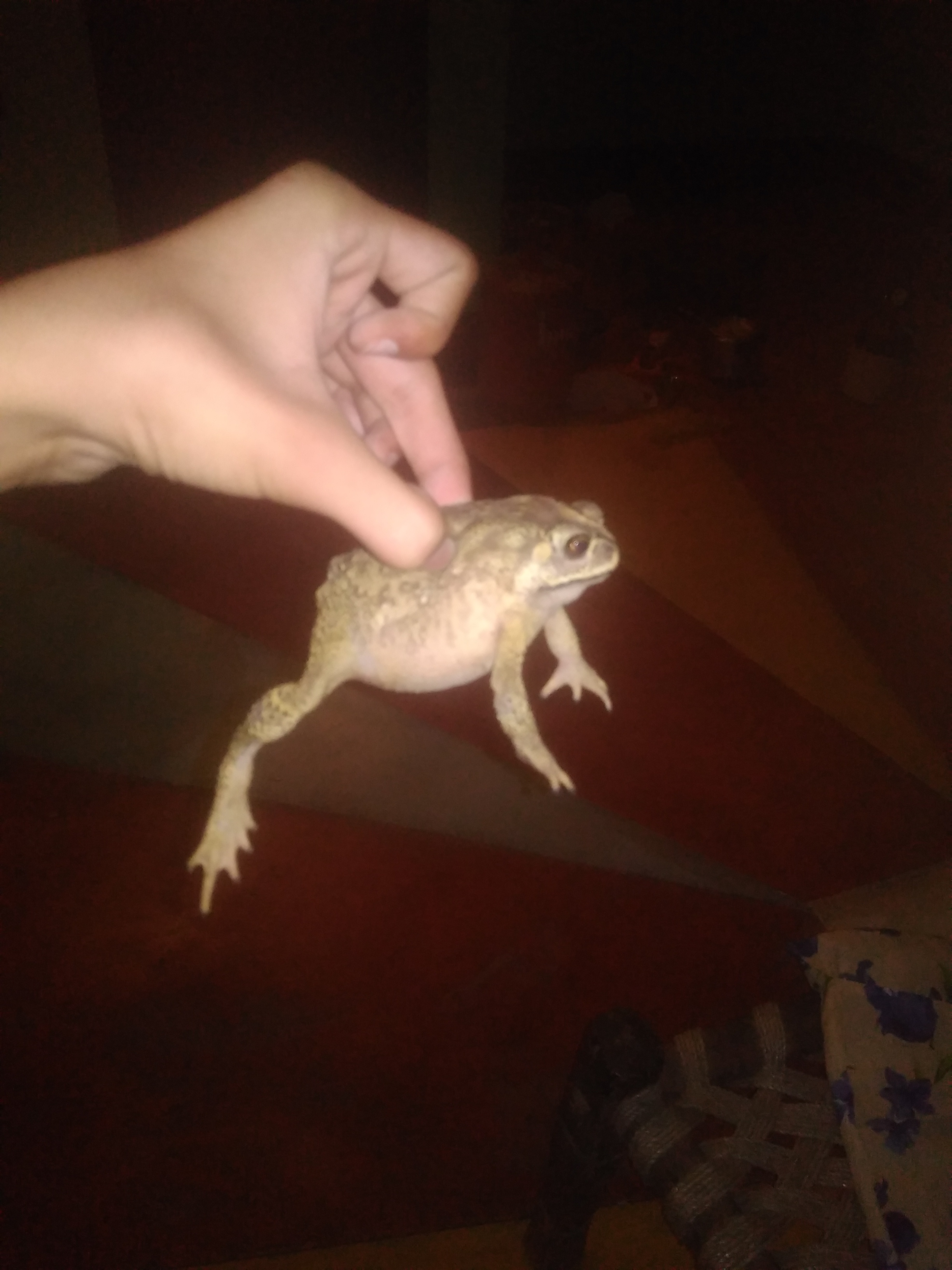
Duttaphrynus stomaticus can be pests even in parts far away from the Indus Valley like this one caught in the Indian state of Uttar Pradesh.

This toad lacks cranial crests and the space between the eyes is broader than the upper eyelid. The tympanum of the ear is two-thirds the diameter of the eye. The first and second fingers are nearly equal and there is a single sub-articular tubercle. A spiny ridge is found on the tarsus. There is a tibial gland and the parotoid is longer than broad. Three dark bands run transversely on the forearm. The underside is whitish with dark mottling on the throat.

They are nocturnal, so during the day hide from predators under rocks or fallen leaves. They are monsoon breeders and lay their eggs in small ponds during rainy season.
