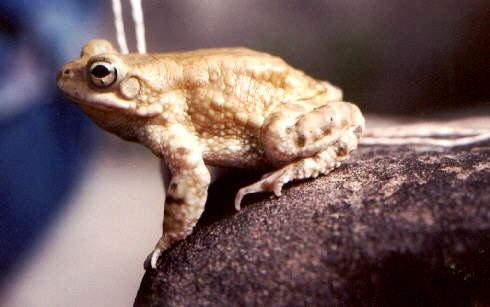

Conservation status
- Least Concern (IUCN 3.1)

Scientific classification
- Kingdom: Animalia
- Phylum: Chordata
- Class: Amphibia
- Order: Anura
- Family: Bufonidae
- Genus: Firouzophrynus
- Species: F. olivaceus

Binomial name
- Firouzophrynus olivaceus (Blanford, 1874)

Synonyms
- Bufo olivaceus Duttaphrynus olivaceus

= Firouzophrynus olivaceus =

Species of amphibian

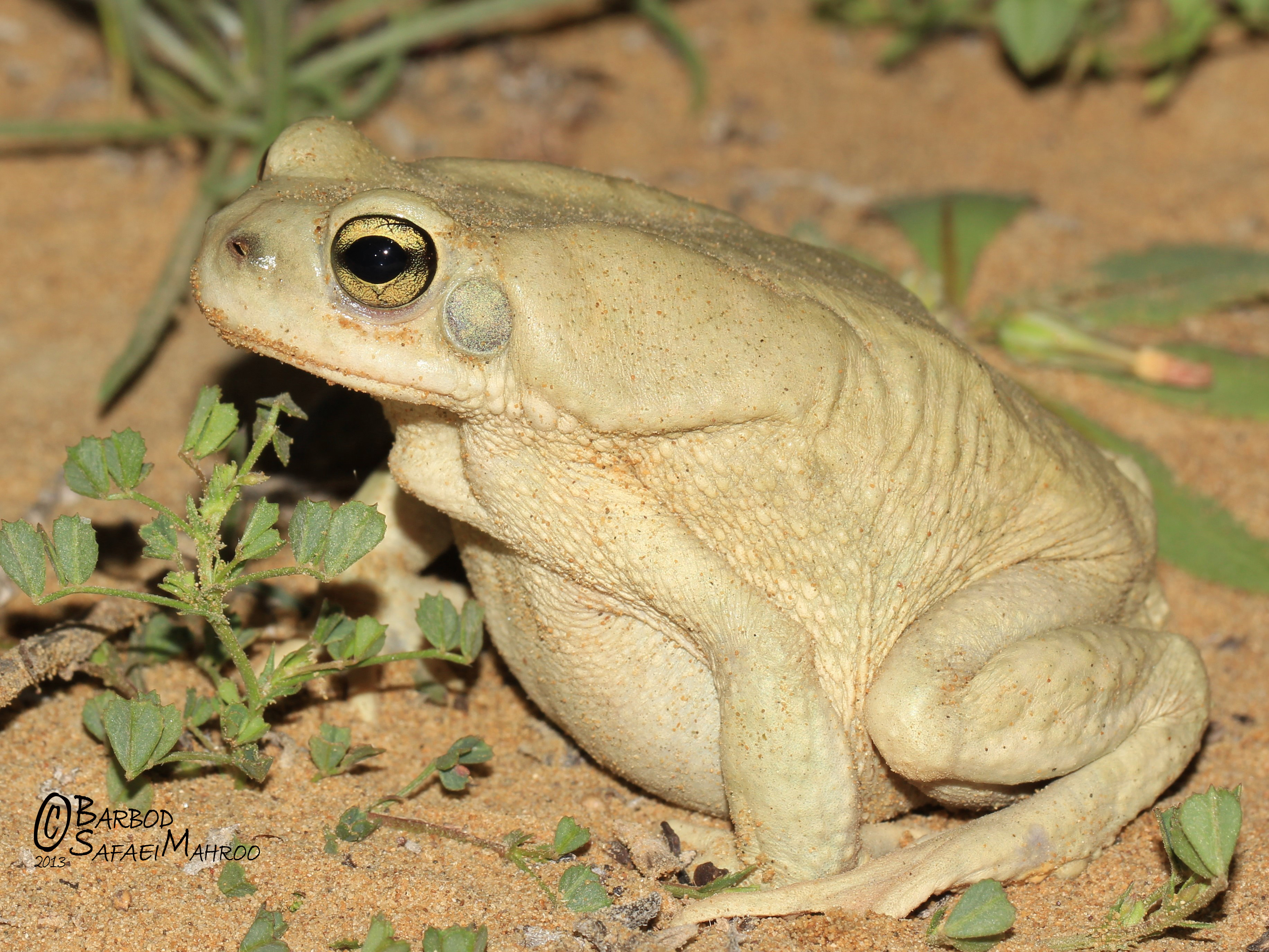
F. olivaceus in Sistan and Baluchestan province of Iran

Firouzophrynus olivaceus is a species of toad in the family Bufonidae. It is found in southeastern Iran and western Pakistan. Its presence in Afghanistan and India is doubtful. Common names olive toad, Baluchistan coastal toad, Baluchestan coastal toad, and Makran toad have been coined for it.

Firouzophrynus olivaceus occurs in areas where water is available, such as irrigated land, springs, oases, and other types of wetlands at elevations below 700 m (2,300 ft). Breeding takes place in ponds and oases. The surrounding habitat is mostly semi-desert with date palms.

Firouzophrynus olivaceus is an adaptable species that often depends on human-made habitats. It can be locally common. Pollution, habitat alteration, and droughts are localized threats.
