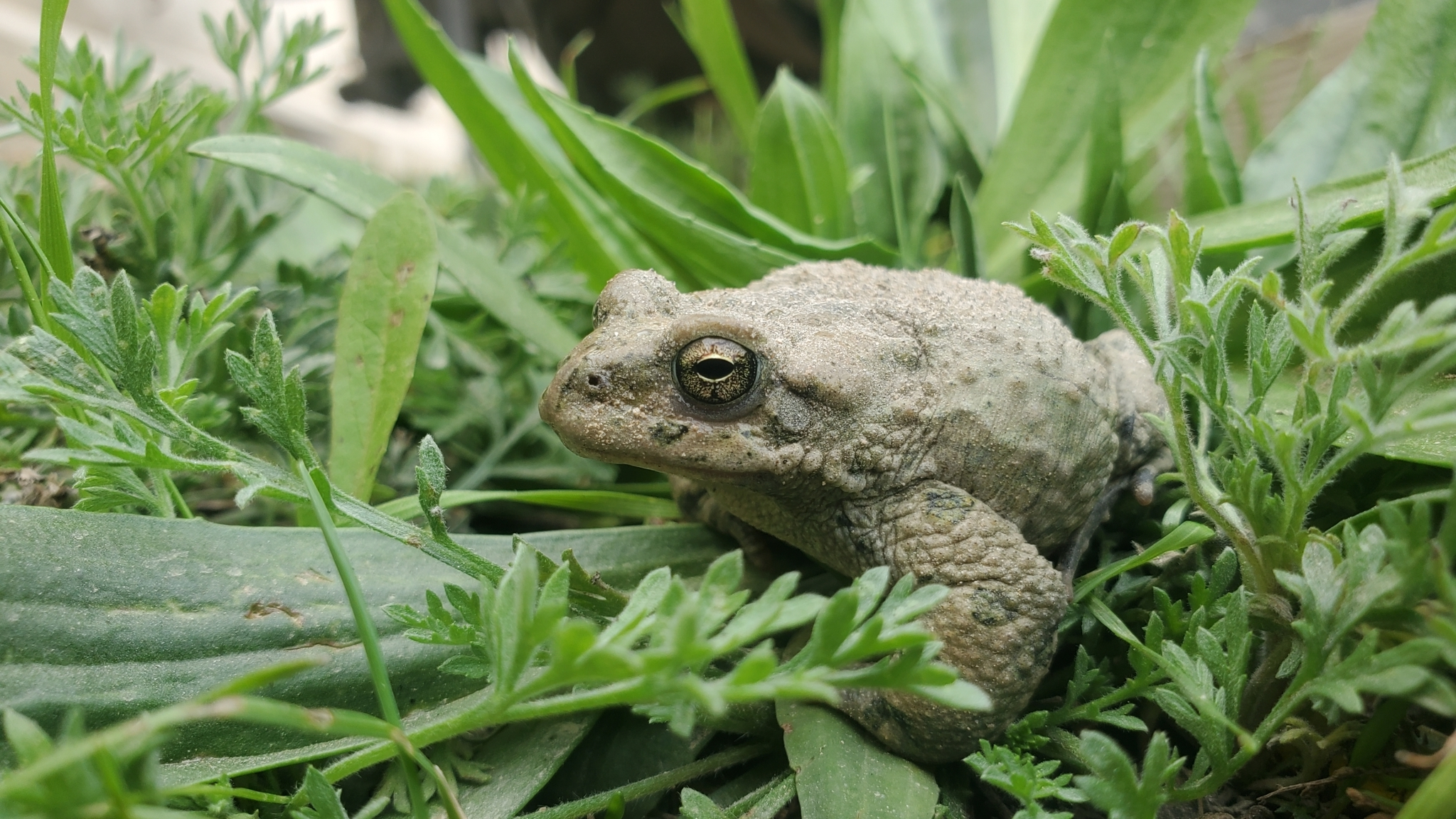

Conservation status
- Least Concern (IUCN 3.1)

Scientific classification
- Kingdom: Animalia
- Phylum: Chordata
- Class: Amphibia
- Order: Anura
- Family: Bufonidae
- Genus: Bufotes
- Species: B. pseudoraddei

Binomial name
- Bufotes pseudoraddei (Mertens, 1971)

Synonyms
- Bufo pseudoraddei; Pseudepidalea pseudoraddei

= Bufotes pseudoraddei =

Batura toad

Species of amphibian

Bufotes pseudoraddei (Batura toad, Batura Glacier toad, or Swat green toad) is a species of toad in the family Bufonidae. It is found in the West Himalayan region, including northern Pakistan and the border area between western Xizang of China and adjacent northwestern India. Its natural habitats are temperate forests, intermittent freshwater marshes, arable land, pastureland, plantations, and rural gardens.
