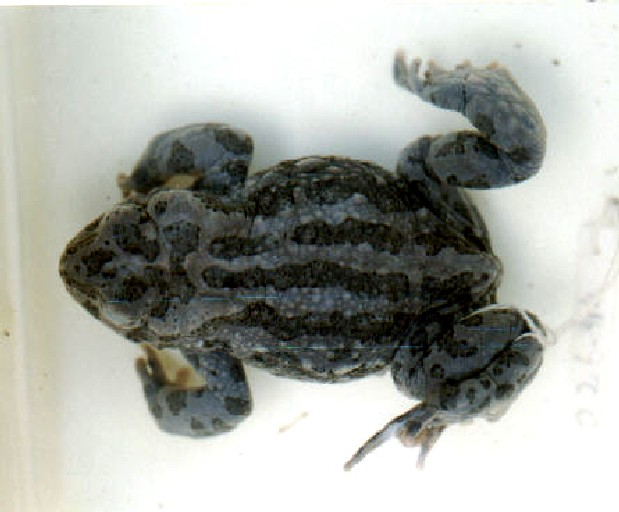

Conservation status
- Least Concern (IUCN 3.1)

Scientific classification
- Kingdom: Animalia
- Phylum: Chordata
- Class: Amphibia
- Order: Anura
- Family: Bufonidae
- Genus: Bufotes
- Species: B. latastii

Binomial name
- Bufotes latastii (Boulenger, 1882)

Synonyms
- Bufo latastii Boulenger, 1882; Bufo siachinensis Khan, 1997; Pseudepidalea latastii (Boulenger, 1882)

= Bufotes latastii =

Species of amphibian

Bufotes latastii, commonly known as the Baltistan toad, Ladakh toad or vertebral-banded toad, is a species of toad in the family Bufonidae. It is found in the West Himalayan region at altitudes of 780–3,200 m (2,560–10,500 ft) from northern Pakistan to Ladakh in India; although sometimes reported elsewhere, this is the result of misidentifications of other species. It is found in alpine forests, coniferous forests, grasslands, paddy fields, mountain desert and roadsides. It often lives near water, like lakes and ponds, in the riparian growth. It can be beneficial to humans as it feeds on insects and their larvae within areas of agriculture.

It is generally fairly common, and not considered threatened by the IUCN, although locally declining due to habitat loss (logging), pesticides, and other sources of pollution.

== Description ==
Adult B. latastii have a snout–vent length of about 4.5–6.2 cm (1.8–2.4 in).

Description from "Fauna of British India":

Crown without bony ridges; snout short, blunt; interorbital space narrower than the upper eyelid; tympanum very distinct, half the diameter of the eye. First finger not extending beyond second; toes two-thirds webbed, with double subartieular tubercles; two moderate metatarsal tubercles; a tarsal fold. The tarsometatarsal articulation reaches the tympanum or the hinder border of the eye. Upper parts with irregular, depressed, distinctly porous warts; parotoids moderate, kidney-shaped; a parotoid-like gland on the calf. Olive above, spotted or marbled with blackish; a light vertebral band; beneath more or less spotted or marbled with blackish.

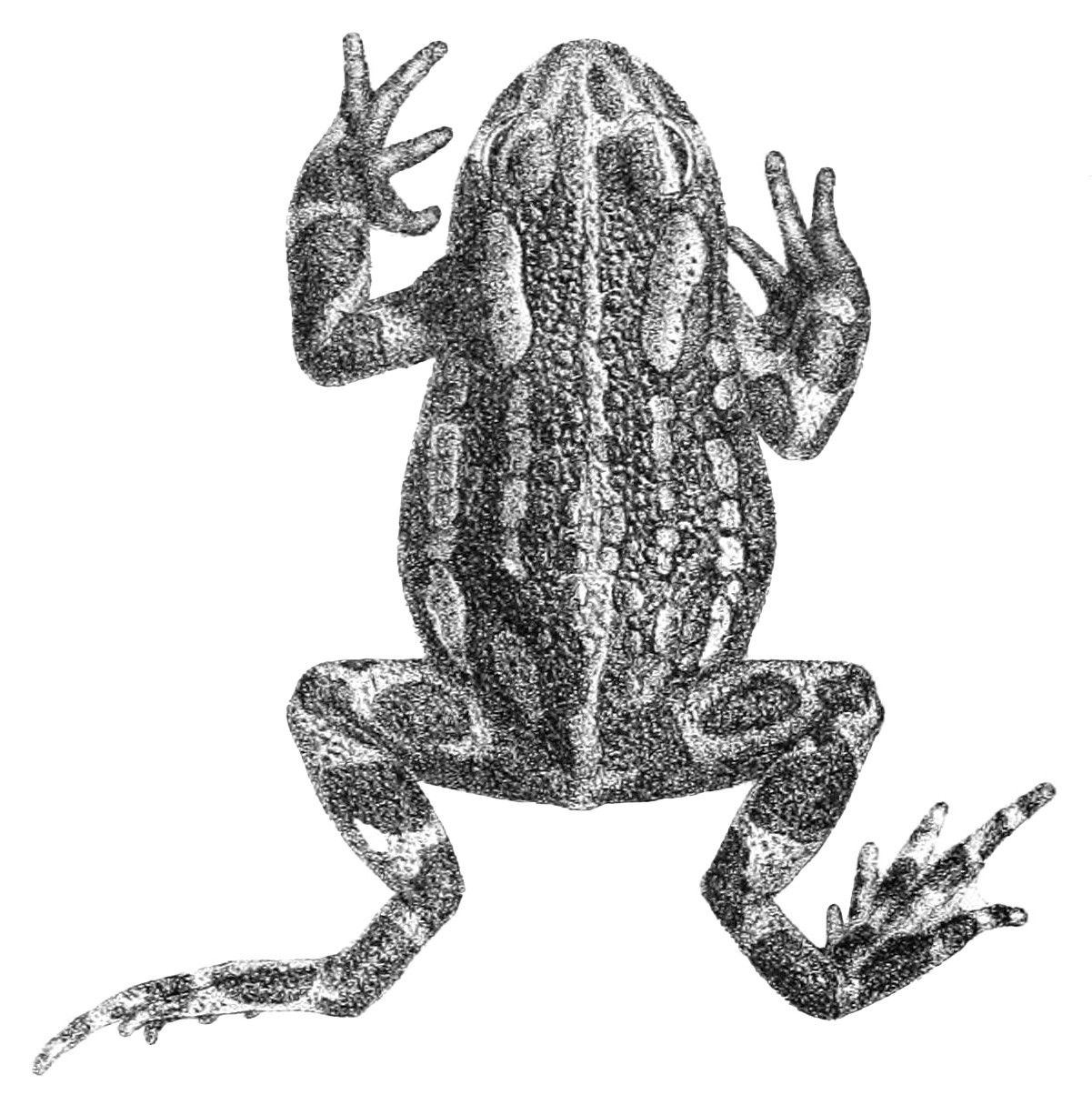
Illustration from "Catalogue of the Batrachia Salientia s. Ecaudata in the collection of the British Museum" (1882)
