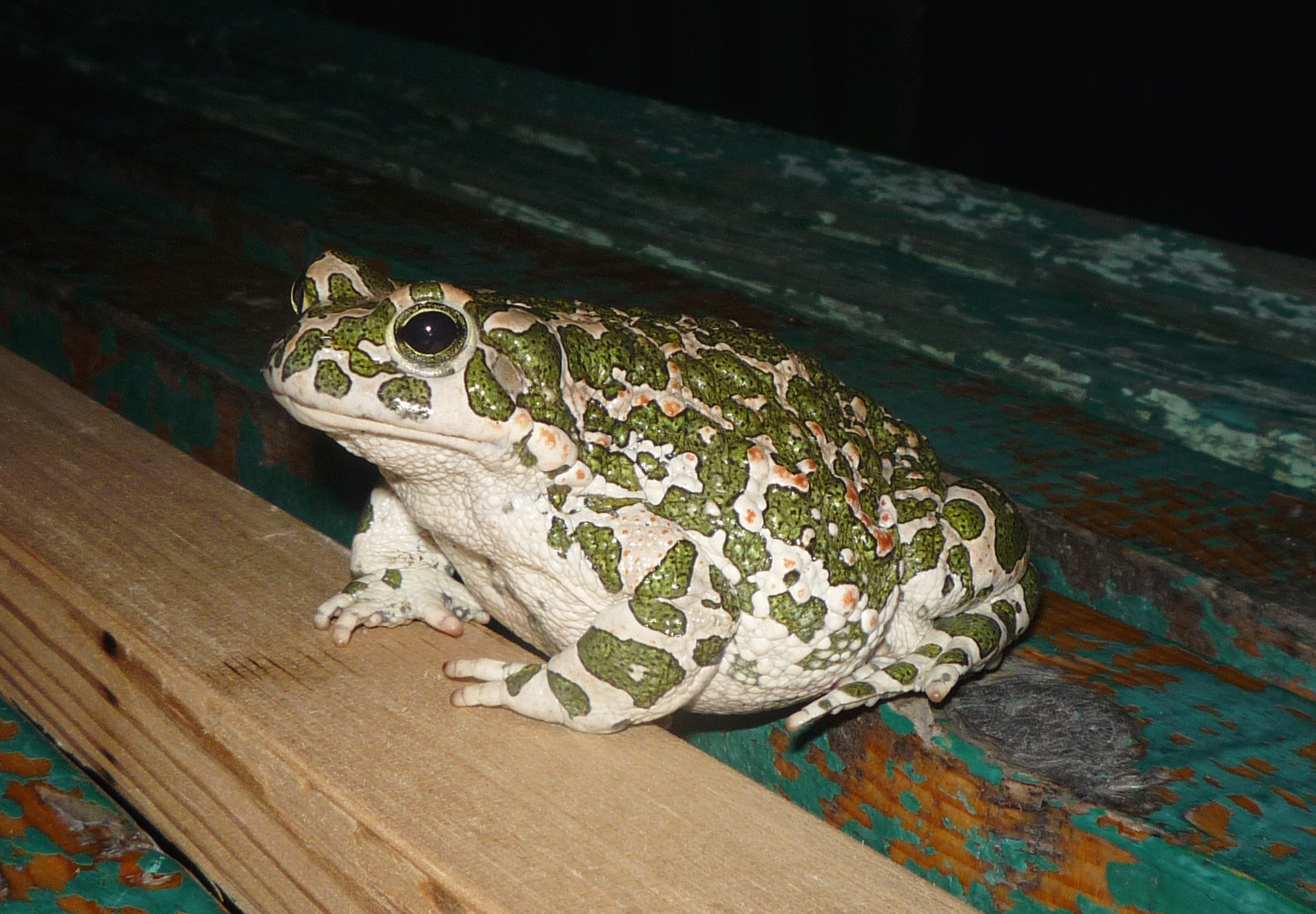

Conservation status
- Least Concern (IUCN 3.1)

Scientific classification
- Kingdom: Animalia
- Phylum: Chordata
- Class: Amphibia
- Order: Anura
- Family: Bufonidae
- Genus: Bufotes
- Species: B. viridis

Binomial name
- Bufotes viridis (Laurenti, 1768)
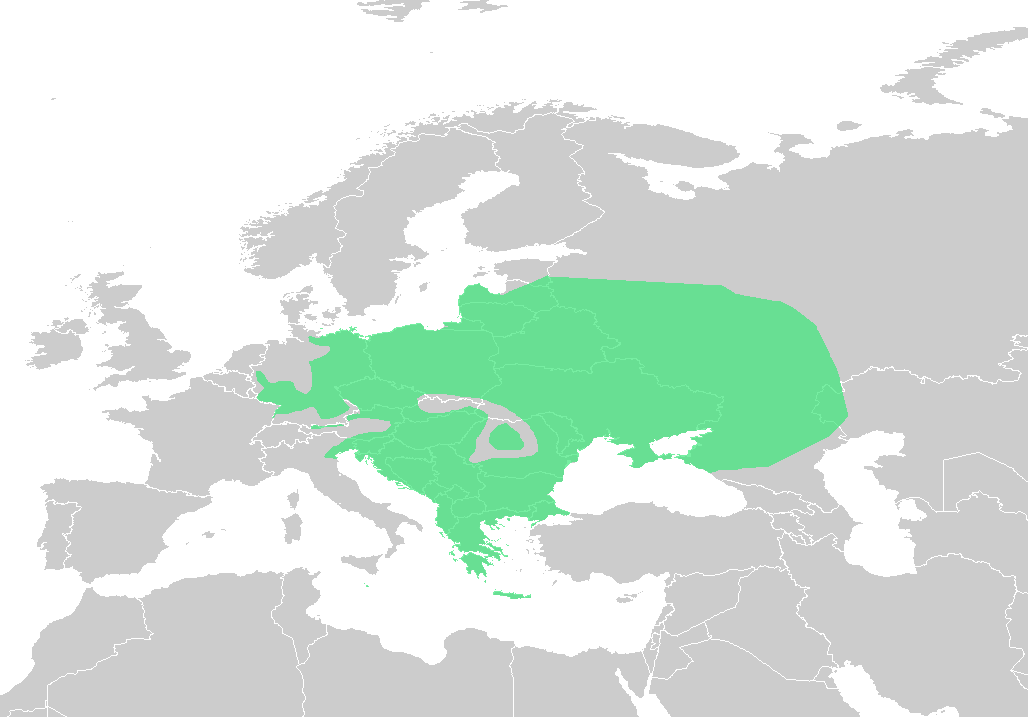
- European green toad range

Synonyms
- Bufo viridis Laurenti, 1768; Pseudepidalea viridis Darrel R. Frost et al., 2006

= European green toad =

Species of amphibian

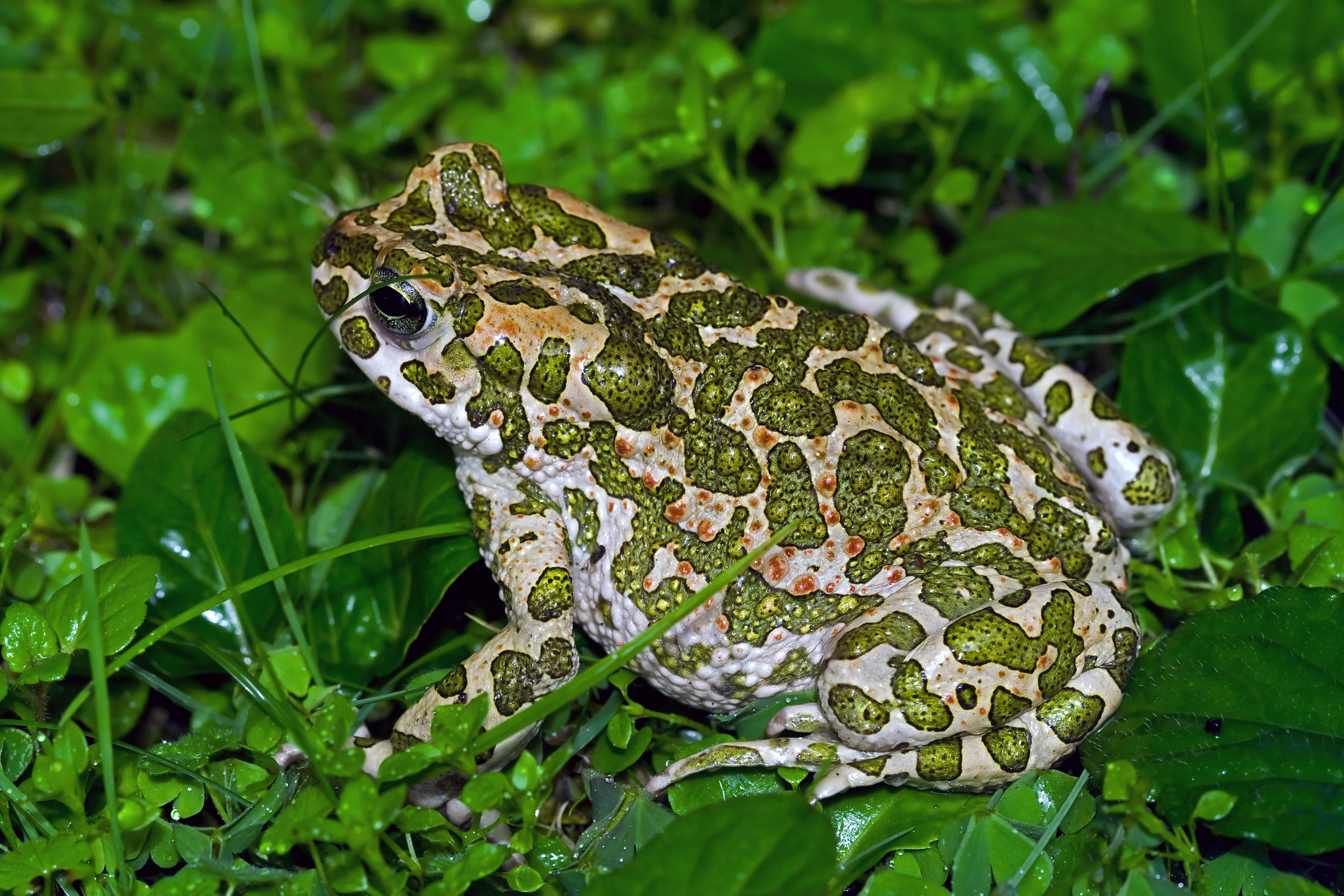
A European Green Toad in nature

European green toad sound

The European green toad (Bufotes viridis) is a species of true toad found in steppes, mountainous areas, semi-deserts, urban areas and other habitats in mainland Europe, ranging from far eastern France and Denmark to the Balkans, European Russia and the Caucasus. As historically defined, the species ranged east through the Middle East and Central Asia to western China, Mongolia and northwestern India, and south through Italy and the Mediterranean islands to North Africa.

Following genetic and morphological reviews, 14 populations (all largely or entirely Asian, except for the African and Balearic green toads) are now regarded as separate species. These species and the European green toad are placed in their own genus Bufotes, but they were included in Bufo.

== Description ==
The spots on the back vary from green to dark brown and sometimes red spots appear, too. The underside is white or very lightly coloured. The European green toad will change colour in response to heat and light changes. Females are larger than males and can lay 9,000 to 15,000 eggs at a time.

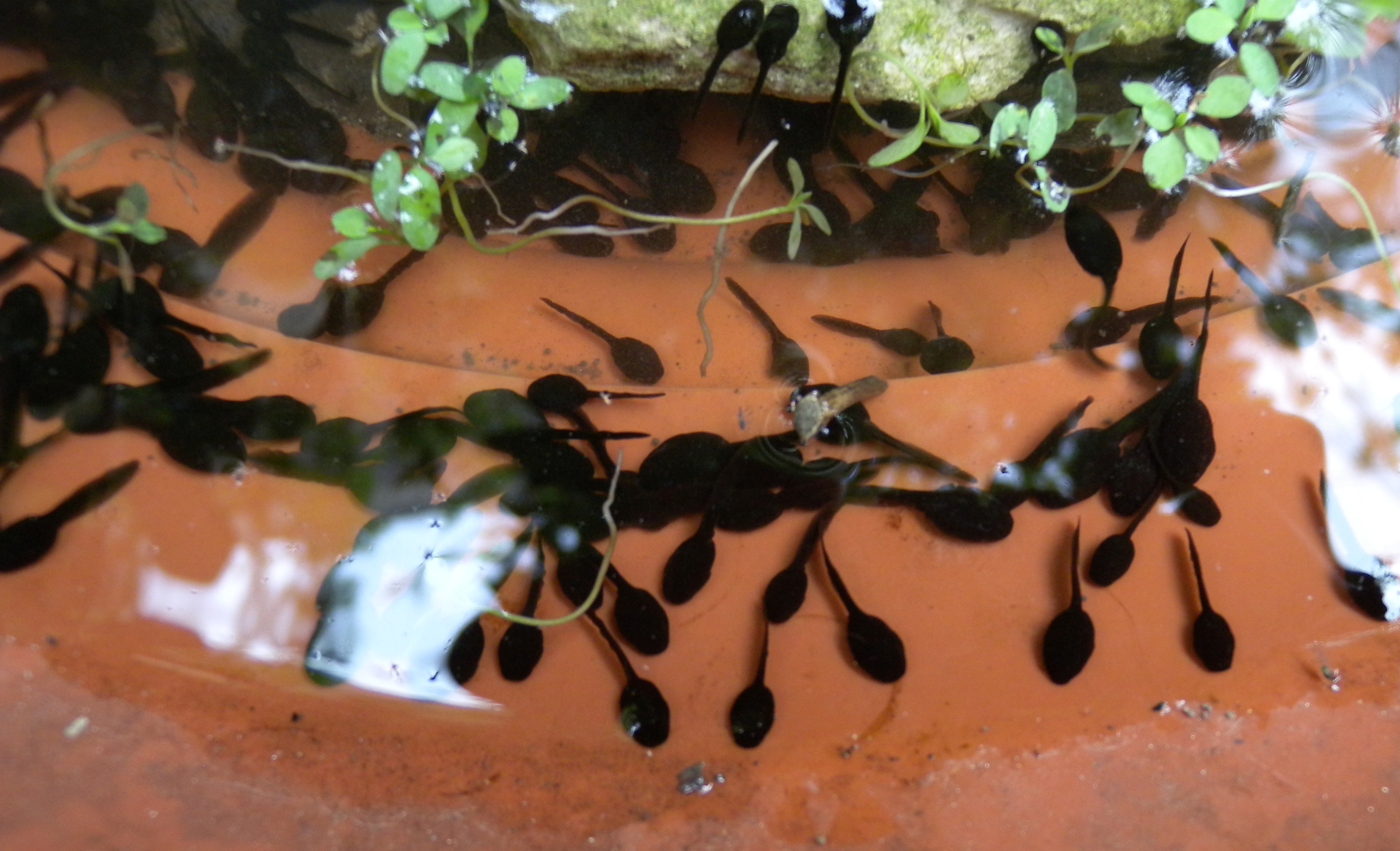
Bufotes viridis tadpoles

It can reach a maximum size (head and body length) of 10 centimetres (3.9 in), but growth to this size is rare.

== Behavior ==
This species of toad is mainly nocturnal, although diurnal behaviors are sometimes recorded during parts of the year, especially in spring. It loves warm summers with high water temperatures and in order to avoid the cold weather it hibernates during the winter. Its lifespan is 8-9 years in captivity and up to 7 years in the wild.

=== Diet ===
Bufotes viridis eats a variety of insects and invertebrates, mainly crickets, meal worms, small butterflies, earthworms, moths, beetles, ants, spiders and caterpillars. There has also been a reported attack on a common pipistrelle in Russia.

=== Defense mechanism ===
The European green toad has the ability to secrete defensive toxins from its parotoid glands and these toxins are effective enough to kill most of the toad's predators. They are harmless to humans when contact is made with the skin.
