= South Iran Nubo–Sindian desert and semi-desert =

Ecoregion in Iran, Iraq, and Pakistan

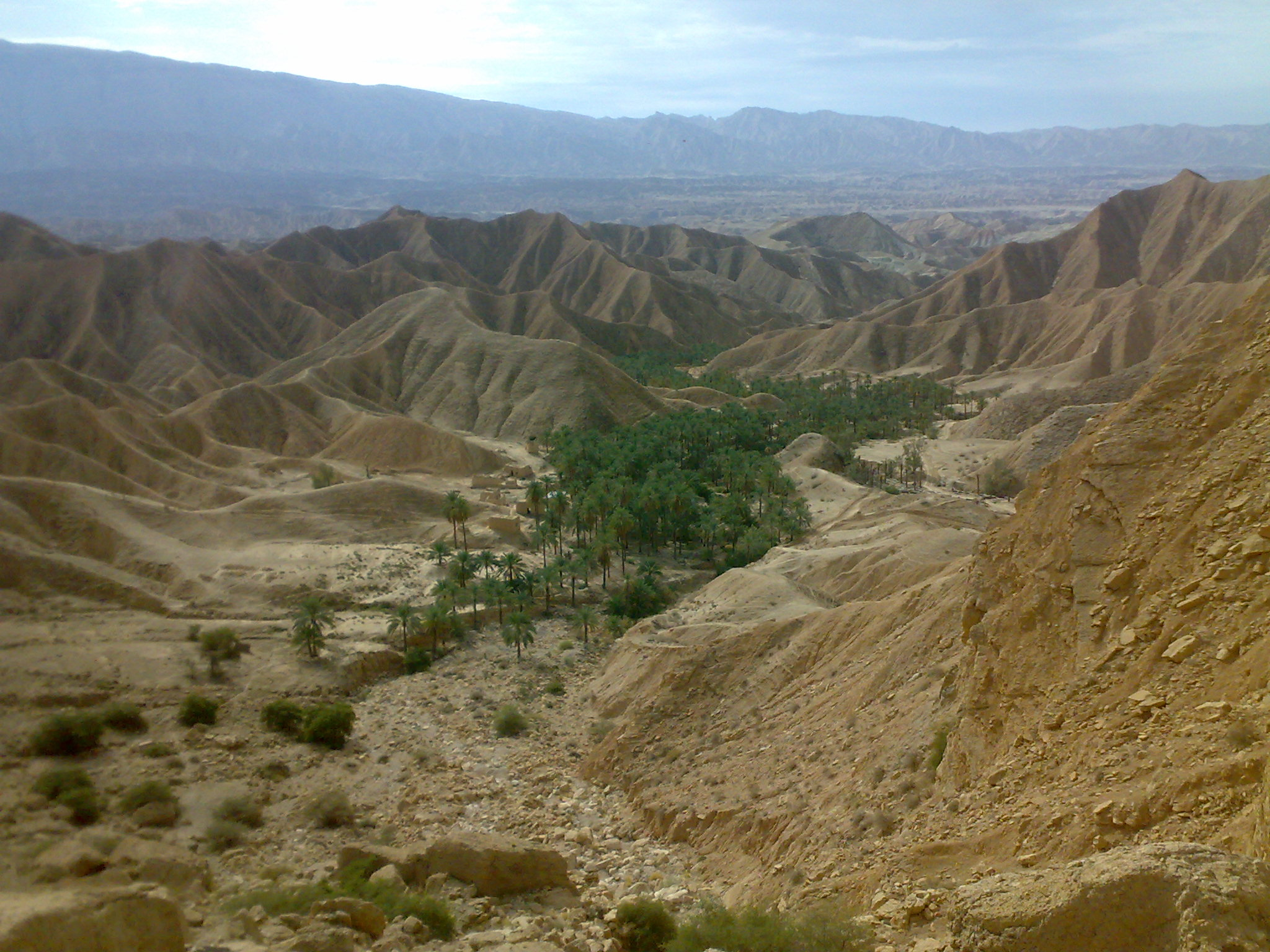
- Landscape in Bushehr Province, Iran

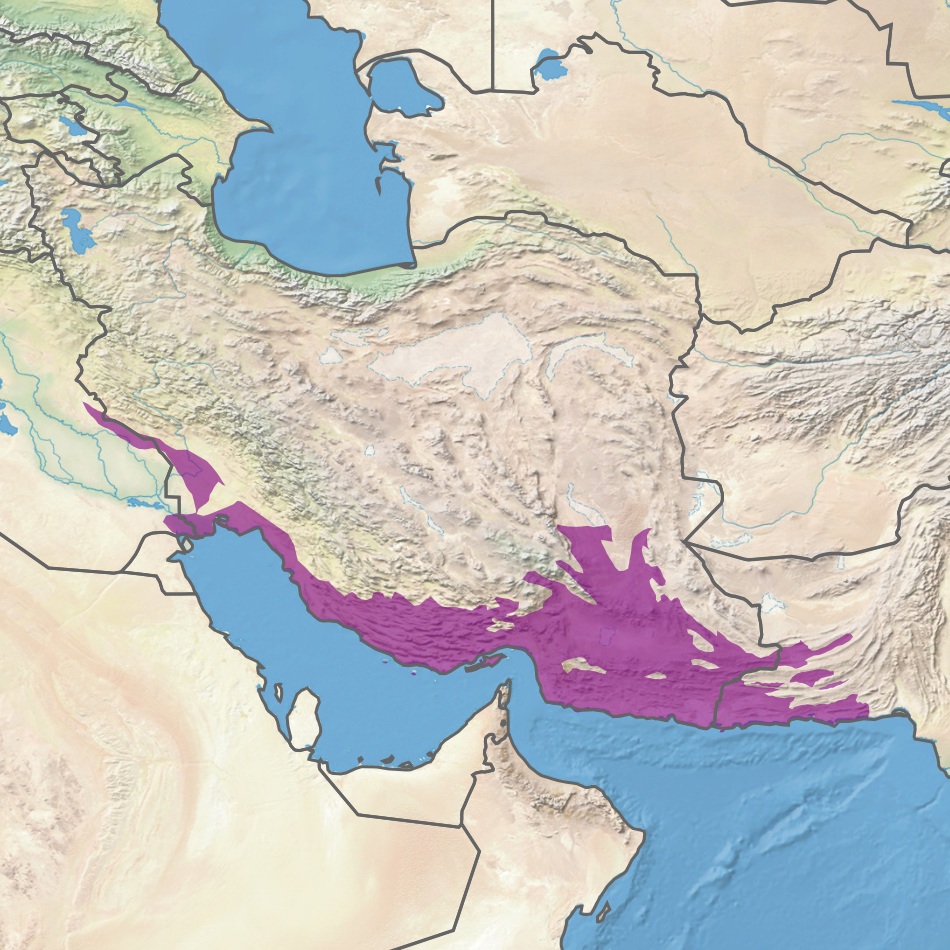
- Ecoregion territory (in purple)

Ecology
- Realm: Palearctic
- Biome: Deserts and xeric shrublands
- Borders: List: Arabian Desert; Baluchistan xeric woodlands; Central Persian desert basins; Kuh Rud and Eastern Iran montane woodlands; Persian Gulf desert and semi-desert; Tigris-Euphrates alluvial salt marsh; Zagros Mountains forest steppe

Geography
- Area: 352,234 km^{2} (135,998 mi^{2})
- Country: Iran, Iraq, Pakistan
- Coordinates: 27.25°N 60.75°E

Conservation
- Protected: 7.48%

The South Iran Nubo–Sindian desert and semi-desert ecoregion (WWF ID: PA1328) covers the northern coastal plain of the Persian Gulf and the inland desert hills south of the Zagros Mountains of Iran. The region also has extensions reaching into southeastern Iraq, and eastward into southwestern Pakistan. The region is one of hot sand deserts, shrubland, and open thorn woodlands inland. Mangrove forests and swamps are found along the coast.

== Location and description ==
The ecoregion stretches for 1,600 kilometres (990 mi) along the northern coast of the Persian Gulf, from the head of the Gulf at Abadan to the estuary of the Hingol River on the southern coast of Pakistan 150 km west of Karachi. For most of its length, the region reaches 120 km inland, but widen considerably east of the Strait of Hormuz. The ecoregion includes the Jaz Murian depression, an endorheic basin in southeastern Iran enclosed by mountains. As it enters Pakistan the ecoregion covers the Makran Coastal Range. Elevations range from sea level to 3,283 metres (10,771 ft), with a mean of 559 metres (1,834 ft).

== Climate ==
The climate of the ecoregion is Hot desert climate (Köppen climate classification (BWh)). This climate features stable air and high pressure aloft, producing a hot, arid desert. Hot-month temperatures typically average 29–35 °C (84–95 °F).

== Flora ==
Most of the ecoregion is dry shrubland interspersed with sandy desert. 8% is herbaceous cover or converted to agriculture.

Various tropical desert plant communities are found here, including:

- Periploca aphylla – Prunus arabica association
- Euphorbia larica – Plocama aucheri association
- Euphorbia larica – Convolvulus acanthocladus association
- Euphorbia larica – Sphaerocoma hookeri subsp. aucheri association
- Convolvulus acanthocladus, Helianthemum lippii, Gymnocarpos decander, Echiochilon persicum, Convolvulus spinosus, Cymbopogon schoenanthus, Dichanthium foveolatum, Aristida spp., Forsskaolea tenacissima, and Plocama calycoptera association
- Vachellia flava – Prosopis cineraria association

At the north end of the Gulf is the Shadegan Ponds on the delta of the Karun River. This internationally important wetland features brackish sedge marshes dominated by Bulrush (Scirpus) in the better drained areas, and Tamarix on the mudflats. Farther south along the coast is a representative mangrove community at the deltas of the Rud-e-Gaz and Rud-e-Hara Rivers at Hormuz. This area features tidal creeks, mudflats, and mangrove swamp. At the mouths of the rivers are extensive stands of grey mangrove (Avicennia marina), known locally as the Hara tree.

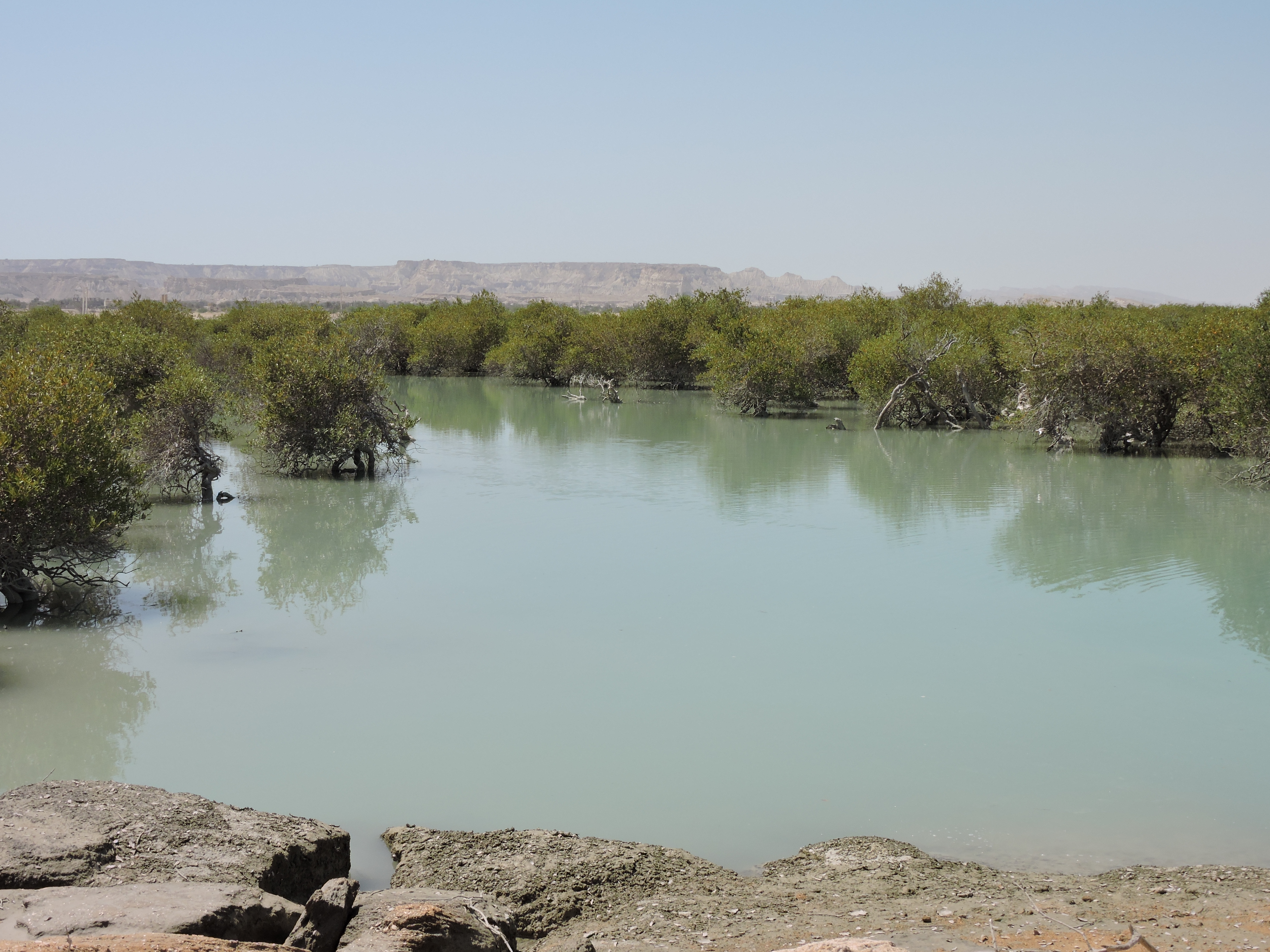
Mangrove forests at Qeshm

The ecoregion corresponds to the South Iranian Floristic Province identified by Armen Takhtajan, and is part of the Omano-Sindian Subregion. Takhtajan thought it the floristically richest province of the subregion. Endemic and near-endemic plants including the species Salvia majdae (syn. Zhumeria majdae) and the species Diceratella canescens, Diceratella floccosa, Grewia tenax subsp. makranica, Zygophyllum acerosum, Zygophyllum subinerme, Moluccella aucheri, Achillea eriophora, Echinops kotschyi, and Iphiona aucheri. Other wider-ranging native plants include Argyrolobium roseum subsp. roseum, Crotalaria persica, Monsonia nivea, Pycnocycla nodiflora, Salvia mirzayanii, and Schweinfurthia papilionacea.

== Fauna ==
Native mammals include the chinkara (Gazella bennettii), goitered gazelle (Gazella subgutturosa), African wildcat (Felis lybica), Indian grey mongoose (Urva edwardsii), jungle cat (Felis chaus), striped hyena (Hyaena hyaena), and Persian trident bat (Triaenops persicus). The Iranian shrew (Crocidura susiana) is endemic.

Resident breeding birds include crowned sandgrouse (Pterocles coronatus), bar-tailed lark (Ammomanes cinctura zarudnyi), and pale rock martin (Ptyonoprogne obsoleta). MacQueen's bustard (Chlamydotis macqueenii) winters here.

The region is important for reptiles and amphibians. Common species are the Iranian toad (Bufotes surdus), Persian ground agama (Trapelus persicus), Iranian comb-fingered gecko (Stenodactylus affinis), ocellated skink (Chalcides ocellatus), rock semaphore gecko (Pristurus rupestris), and false cobra (Rhagerhis moilensis).

Endemic species of reptiles and amphibians include Blanford's short-toed gecko (Cyrtopodion brevipes), Jaz murian bent-toed gecko (Mediodactylus sagittifer), Iranian worm snake (Xerotyphlops wilsoni), and Persian krait (Bungarus persicus), a venomous snake of the Elapidae family.

== Protected areas ==
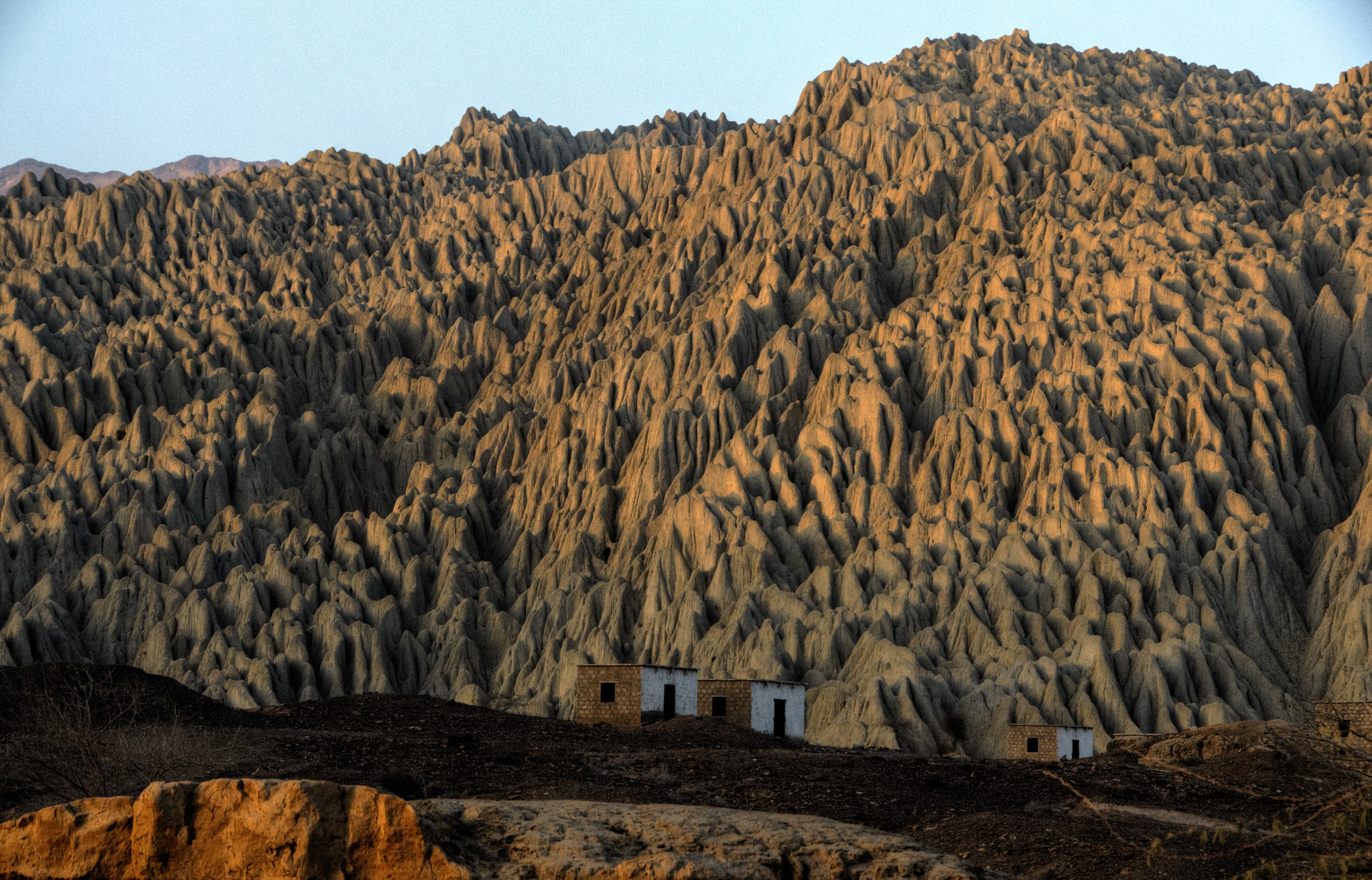
Rock formations at Hingol National Park.

Over 7% of the ecoregion is officially protected. These protected areas include:

- Shadegan Ponds Wildlife Refuge (Iran).
- Geno Biosphere Reserve (Iran).
- Mangrove forests of Qeshm (Iran).
- Hingol National Park (Pakistan).
- Mond protected area (Iran).
