= Zagros Mountains forest steppe =

Temperate broadleaf and mixed forests ecoregion in western Asia

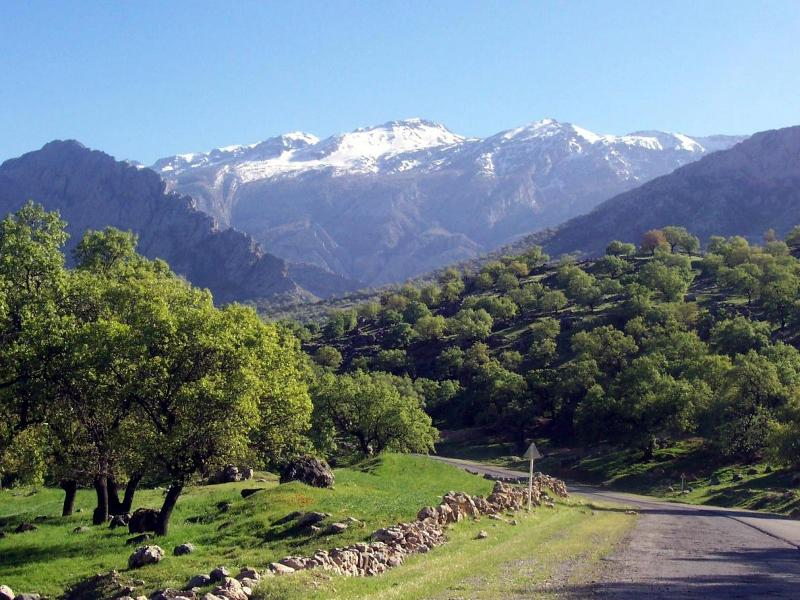
- Landscape near Shadegan

- Map of the ecoregion

Ecology
- Realm: Palearctic
- Biome: temperate broadleaf and mixed forests
- Borders: List: Central Persian desert basins; Eastern Anatolian montane steppe; Eastern Mediterranean conifer-sclerophyllous-broadleaf forests; Kuh Rud and Eastern Iran montane woodlands; Mesopotamian shrub desert; Middle East steppe; South Iran Nubo-Sindian desert and semi-desert; Tigris-Euphrates alluvial salt marsh

Geography
- Area: 397,555 km^{2} (153,497 mi^{2})
- Countries: Iran; Iraq, Turkey

Conservation
- Conservation status: Critical/endangered
- Protected: 20,339 km^{2} (5%)

The Zagros Mountains forest steppe is a temperate broadleaf and mixed forests ecoregion in Western Asia. The ecoregion extends along the Zagros Mountains, stretching from eastern Turkey and northern Iraq to southern Iran.

== Geography ==
The Zagros Mountains are a belt of folded mountains formed by the collision of the African Plate with the Eurasian Plate. On the west, south, and east, the mountains are surrounded by deserts and semi-deserts. The dry grasslands, shrublands, and low-lying deserts of Mesopotamia and southern Iran lie to the west, and the plateau deserts of the Iranian Plateau to the east. The Armenian Highlands and Alborz Mountains lie to the north.

== Climate ==
The ecoregion's climate is semi-arid and temperate. Annual precipitation ranges from 400 mm to 800 mm, and falls mostly in winter and spring. Summers are hot and dry, and winters are cold, with the coldest winter temperatures dropping below −25 °C (-13 °F). Temperatures are generally warmer and the climate drier at the southern end of the range.

== Flora ==
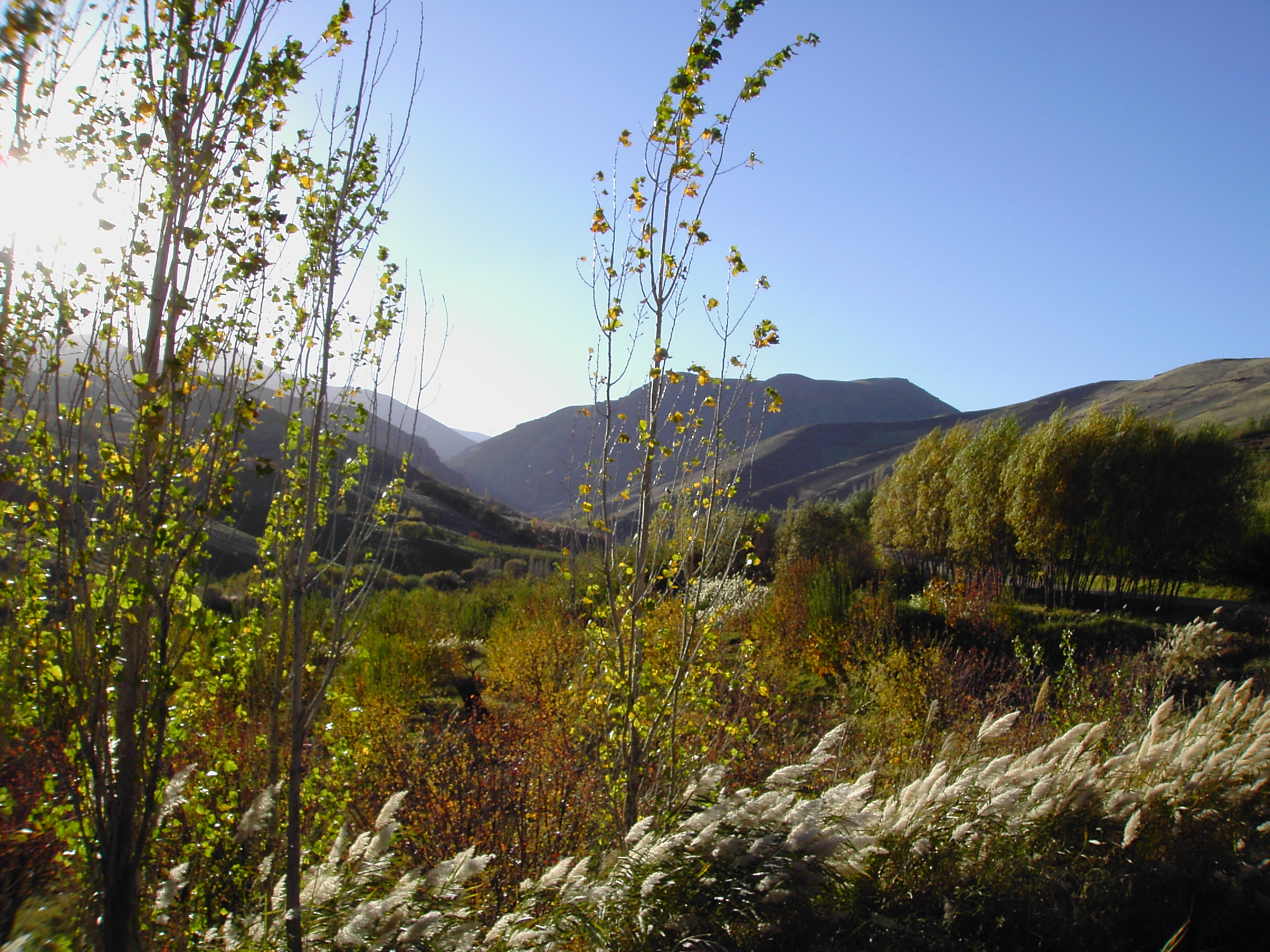
A view of Persian oak forests that dominate the Zagros Mountains

The predominant plant community in the mountains is forest or open woodland of deciduous broadleaf trees, with an understory of steppe shrubs and grasses. Oaks, particularly Persian oak (Quercus brantii), are the characteristic trees, covering over 50% of the Zagros mountains in Iran. Pistachio (Pistacia spp.) forms groves, and grows in association with oaks. Vegetation varies with altitude and exposure to prevailing winds. In the northern part of the ecoregion, shrub steppe of Astragalus spp. and Salvia spp. with scattered trees occurs above 400m to 500m elevation. Forests and forest remnants of Quercus brantii and/or Q. boissieri occur from 700 to 800 meters elevation to about 1,700 m. The treeline is at 1,900 to 2,000 meters elevation, with sub-alpine vegetation above it.

Commonly associated with three main Quercus species (Quercus brantii, Quercus infectoria, and Quercus libani) are Acer monspessulanum, Pistacia atlantica var. kurdica, Pistacia khinjuk, Rhus coriaria, Crataegus azarolus (also occasionally Crataegus monogyna and Crataegus meyeri), Pyrus syriaca, Juniperus deltoides (particularly at the medium lower levels in the north-west parts of the range), Juniperus polycarpos (mostly in the south-east parts of the range), Lonicera nummulariifolia, Cotoneaster nummularius, Prunus argentea, Prunus arabica, Prunus microcarpa, Prunus mahaleb, Celtis tournefortii, Anagyris foetida (particularly in the lower parts of the forest), Rhamnus kurdica, and Paliurus spina-christi. The arborescent species commonly found alongside mountain streams in the forest zone are Salix acmophylla, Salix alba, Platanus orientalis, Fraxinus angustifolia subsp. syriaca, Populus euphratica, Ficus carica, and Juglans regia. Among shrubs Vitis vinifera, Rubus sanctus, Cionura erecta, Rosa canina, Nerium oleander, and Vitex agnus-castus are abundant.

At the southern end of the range, the trees are sparser and more open, and the steppe vegetation is more prominent. Steppe extends up to 1400 meters elevation, and open woodlands of Quercus brantii, hawthorn (Crataegus), almond (Prunus amygdalus), nettle tree (Celtis spp.) and pear (Pyrus syriaca and Pyrus glabra) continue up to 2,400 meters.

Although degraded from overgrazing and deforestation, the Zagros is home to a rich and complex flora. Remnants of the originally widespread oak-dominated woodland can still be found, as can park-like pistachio-almond steppelands. The wild ancestors of many important food plants, including wheat, barley, lentil, almond, walnut, pistachio, apricot, plum, pomegranate, and grape, grow throughout the mountains. Endemic plants of the mountain range include Allium iranicum, Astragalus crenophila, Bellevalia kurdistanica, Cousinia carduchorum, Cousinia odontolepis, Echinops rectangularis, Erysimum boissieri, Iris barnumiae, Ornithogalum iraqense, Quercus magnosquamata, Quercus ophiosquamata, Quercus saei, Scrophularia atroglandulosa, Scorzonera kurdistanica, Tragopogon rechingeri, and Tulipa kurdica.

== Fauna ==
The Zagros are home to many threatened and endangered animals, including the Persian leopard (Panthera pardus tulliana), Syrian brown bear (Ursus arctos syriacus), mouflon (Ovis orientalis orientalis), wolf (Canis lupus), striped hyena (Hyena hyena), Blanford's fox (Vulpes cana), and Zagros Mountains mouse-like hamster (Calomyscus bailwardi). Wild goats (Capra aegagrus) can be found throughout the Zagros Mountains. The Persian fallow deer (Dama mesopotamica), once thought extinct, was rediscovered in the late 20th century in Khuzestan Province in the southern Zagros.

In the late 19th century, the Asiatic lion (Panthera leo persica) inhabited the southwestern part of the mountains. It is now extinct in this region.

The Luristan newt (Neurergus kaiseri) is a vulnerable species endemic to the central Zagros mountains of Iran.

== Protected areas ==
A 2017 assessment found that 20,339 km^{2}, or 5%, of the ecoregion is in protected areas. Protected areas include:

- Arjan and Parishan Protected Area (IUCN category V, 597.8 km^{2})
- Bamou National Park (IUCN category II, 486.8 km^{2})
- Bakhtegan Wildlife Refuge (IUCN category IV, 2004 km^{2})
- Kolahghazi Wildlife Refuge (IUCN category IV, 41.2 km^{2})
- Dez Wildlife Refuge (IUCN category IV, 53 km^{2})
- Bijar Protected Area (IUCN category V, 316.1 km^{2})
- Bahramgor Protected Area (IUCN category V, 4080 km^{2})
- Angoran Protected Area (IUCN category V, 923.2 km^{2})
- Dez Protected Area (IUCN category V, 175.3 km^{2})
- Karkheh Protected Area (IUCN category V, 140 km^{2})
