= Kuh Rud and Eastern Iran montane woodlands =

Ecoregion in central and eastern Iran

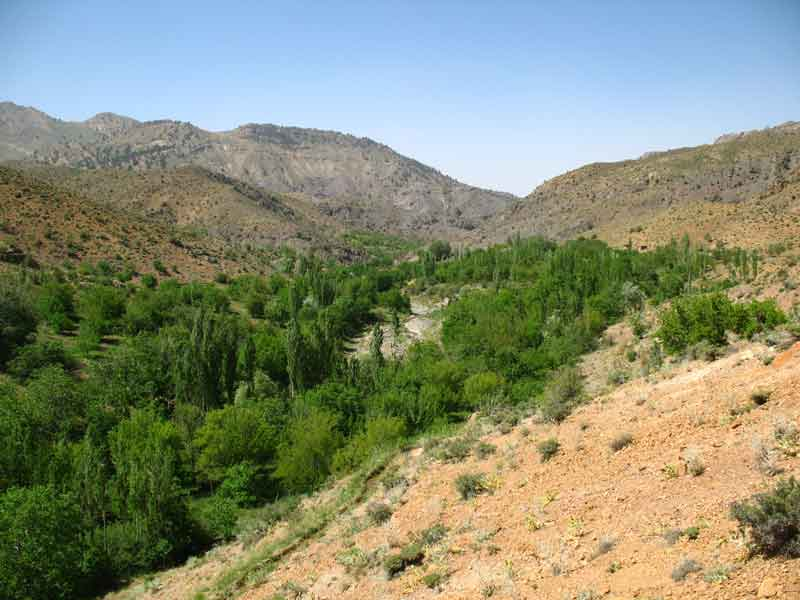
- Near Sarmeshk, Iran

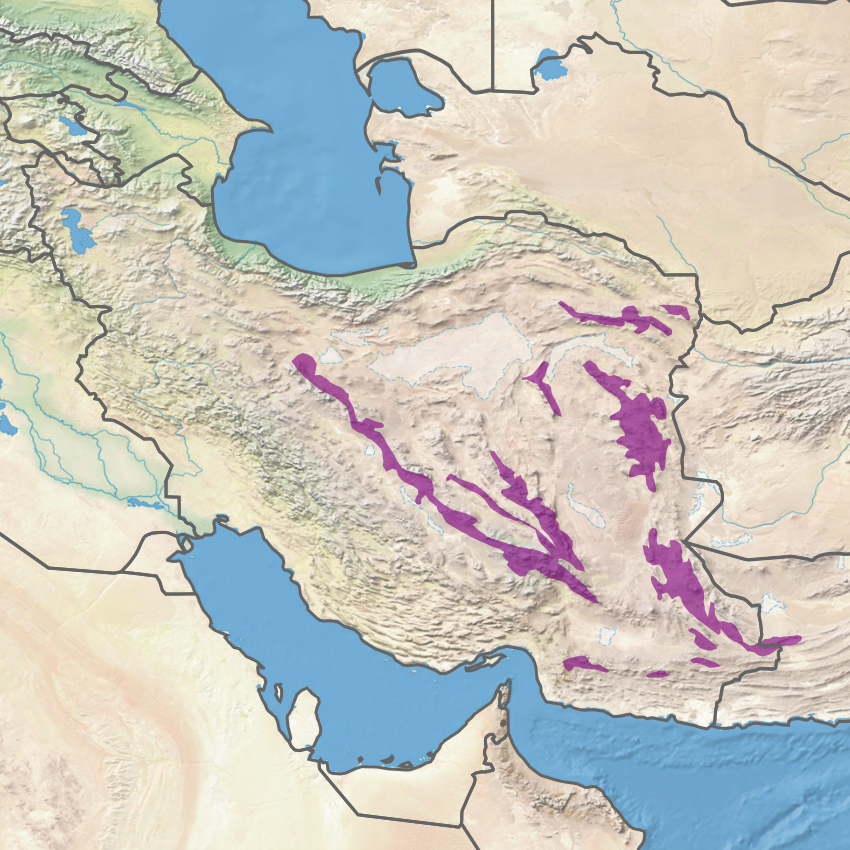
- Ecoregion territory (in purple)

Ecology
- Realm: Palearctic
- Biome: Montane grasslands and shrublands
- Borders: Central Persian desert basins; Registan-North Pakistan sandy desert; South Iran Nubo-Sindian desert and semi-desert, Zagros Mountains forest steppe

Geography
- Area: 126,623 km^{2} (48,889 mi^{2})
- Country: Iran, Pakistan
- Coordinates: 32.75°N 59.75°E

Conservation
- Protected: 1.7%

The Kuh Rud and Eastern Iran montane woodlands ecoregion (WWF ID: PA1009) covers hills and mountains in central and eastern Iran. The habitat is wetter and cooler than the surrounding desert of the Iranian Plateau, supporting the vulnerable goitered gazelle and small populations of the cheetah. The ecoregion is under conservation threat from overgrazing and conversion of steep slopes to cultivation.

== Location and description ==
The ecoregion extends for over 800 km along the mountain ridges of the Central Iranian Range, which runs northwest to southeast along western edge of the Iranian Plateau, and along a series of ranges on the eastern side of Iran and a small extension into Pakistan. The mean elevation is 1,788 metres (5,866 ft), with a minimum of 594 metres (1,949 ft) and a maximum of 4,318 metres (14,167 ft). Peaks include Kuh-e-Kargiz (3,890 m) and Shir Kuh (4,075 m) in the Central Iranian Range, and the volcanic peaks Bazman (3,489m) and Taftan (4,042 m) in the southeast. At lower elevations the region transitions into the Central Persian desert basins ecoregion, which includes the Dasht-e Lut desert basin between the Central Iranian Range and the eastern ranges. The Registan–North Pakistan sandy desert ecoregion lies in the Sistan Basin east of the eastern ranges. In the south, the lower and drier elevations are in the South Iran Nubo-Sindian desert and semi-desert ecoregion.

== Climate ==
The climate of the ecoregion is Cold semi-arid climate (Köppen climate classification (BSk)). This climate is characteristic of steppe climates intermediary between desert humid climates, and typically have precipitation is above evapotranspiration. At least one month averages below 0 °C (32 °F).

== Flora and fauna ==
Despite the term "woodlands" in the name of the ecoregion, less than 1% of the territory is forested. About 10% has herbaceous or shrub cover; the remaining 90% is bare or with sparse vegetation. The forest-steppe areas feature widely spaced trees/shrubs of genus Pistacia (pistachio) and Amygdalus (almond). Historically, these two types of plants were the characteristic feature of this region. The surroundings of these will be thorn-cushion and herbaceous vegetation. Other shrub cover is of genus Pteropyrum and Lycium (box-thorn).

== Protected areas ==
Less than 2% of the ecoregion is officially protected.
