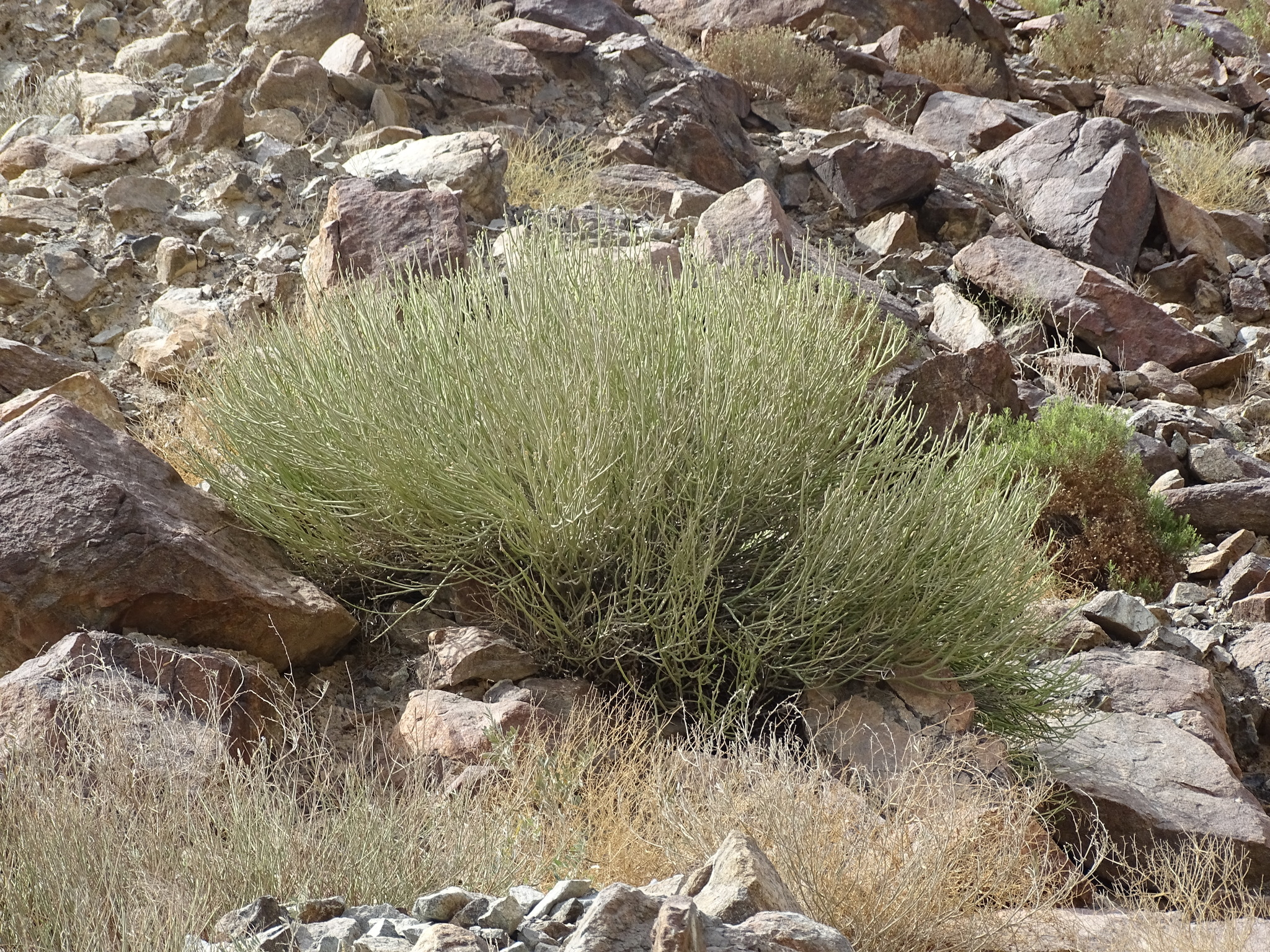

Scientific classification
- Kingdom: Plantae
- Clade: Tracheophytes
- Clade: Angiosperms
- Clade: Eudicots
- Clade: Rosids
- Order: Malpighiales
- Family: Euphorbiaceae
- Genus: Euphorbia
- Species: E. larica

Binomial name
- Euphorbia larica Boiss.

Synonyms
- Euphorbia masirahensis Ghaz.; Tirucalia larica (Boiss.) P.V.Heath

= Euphorbia larica =

Species of flowering plant

Euphorbia larica is a semi-succulent shrub or subshrub native to southern Iran and the south-eastern part of the Arabian Peninsula (the U.A.E., Oman, and Yemen). In the United Arab Emirates and Oman it is commonly known as isbuq.

== Description ==
Euphorbia larica is a perennial evergreen shrub or subshrub which grows up to 150 cm (59 in) in height. It has many erect stems rising close together. The upper stems and young stems are light-green, while the lower stems are smooth, brown, and woody. Leaves are small and nearly absent. Like many other euphorbias, the stems exude a milky sap when broken. It flowers from November to April, producing small yellow flowers on terminal and upper lateral spikes.

== Range and habitat ==
Euphorbia larica is native to the subtropical deserts of southern Iran, and portions of Arabia, including the Hajar Mountains of northern Oman and the eastern U.A.E., and the Dhofar Mountains of southern Oman.

In the South Iran Nubo–Sindian desert and semi-desert ecoregion of southern Iran, Euphorbia larica is prominent in several shrubland plant communities, including the Euphorbia larica – Plocama aucheri association, Euphorbia larica – Convolvulus acanthocladus association, and Euphorbia larica – Sphaerocoma hookeri subsp. aucheri association.

In the montane woodlands of the Hajar Mountains, Euphorbia larica is predominant on steep and rocky slopes, often in association with Vachellia tortilis, Vachellia gerrardi, and Periploca aphylla.

== See also ==
- Middle East
- Persian Gulf
