= Quercus saei =

Scientific classification
- Kingdom: Plantae
- Clade: Embryophytes
- Clade: Tracheophytes
- Clade: Spermatophytes
- Clade: Angiosperms
- Clade: Eudicots
- Clade: Rosids
- Order: Fagales
- Family: Fagaceae
- Genus: Quercus
- Subgenus: Quercus subg. Cerris
- Section: Quercus sect. Cerris
- Species: Q. saei

Binomial name
- Quercus saei Djav.-Khoie

Species of flowering plant

Quercus ophiosquamata is a species of oak. It is a tree endemic to Iran. It is native to the Zagros Mountains. The type specimen was collected in forests of Meleh Galeh southwest of Shiraz in Fars Province at 2062 metres elevation.

The species was described by Karim Djavanchir-Khoie in 1967, but not validly published by the standards of the International Code of Nomenclature for algae, fungi, and plants. The species was validated by Parisa Panahi and Ziba Jamzad in 2018.
