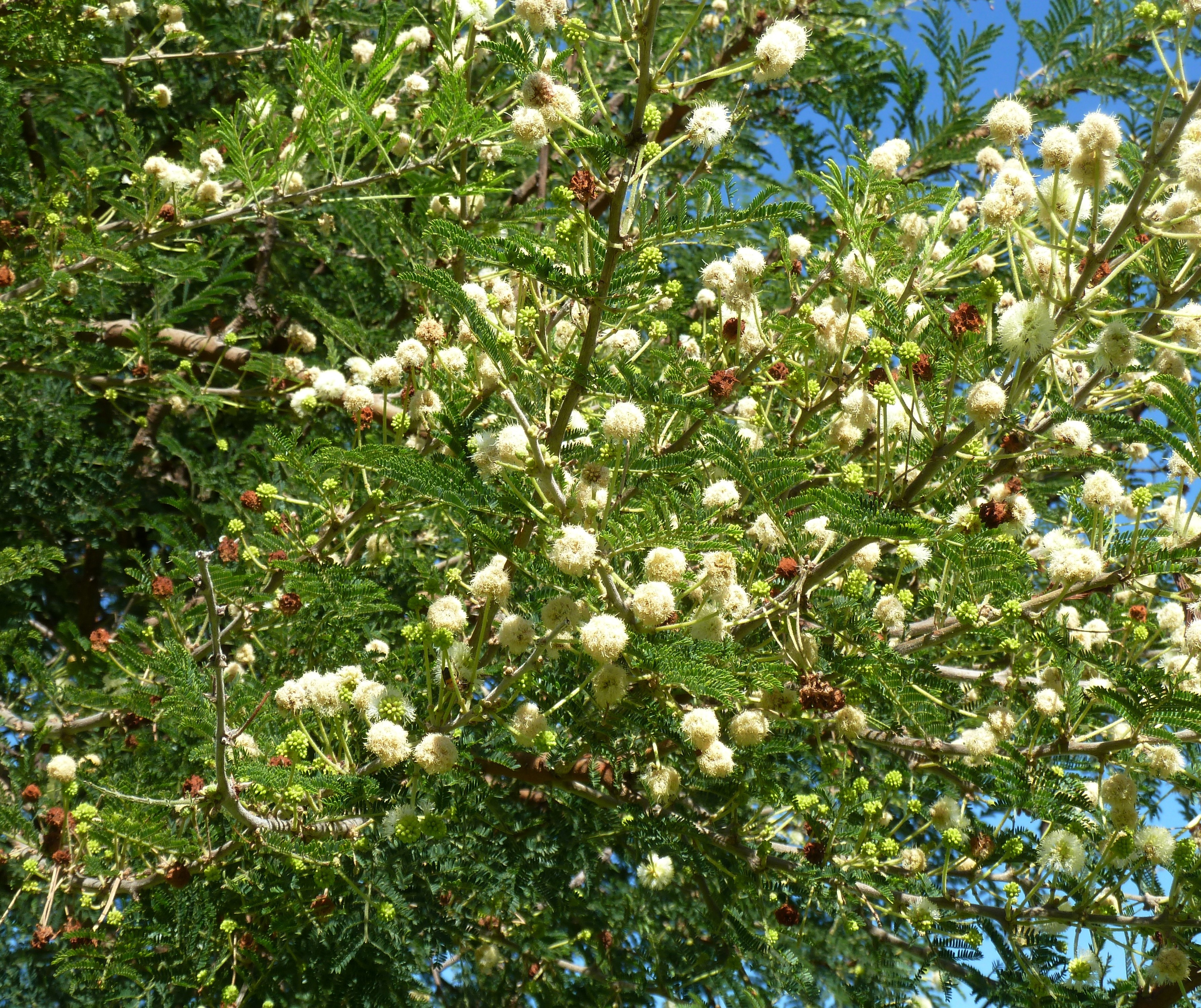

Scientific classification
- Kingdom: Plantae
- Clade: Tracheophytes
- Clade: Angiosperms
- Clade: Eudicots
- Clade: Rosids
- Order: Fabales
- Family: Fabaceae
- Subfamily: Caesalpinioideae
- Clade: Mimosoid clade
- Genus: Vachellia
- Species: V. gerrardi

Binomial name
- Vachellia gerrardi (Benth.) P.J.H.Hurter

Synonyms
- Acacia gerrardi Benth.; synonyms of var. calvescens: Acacia gerrardi var. calvescens Brenan; synonyms of var. gerrardi: Acacia etbaica var. hirta A.Chev.; Acacia hebecladoides Harms; Acacia subtomentosa De Wild.; synonyms of var. latisiliqua: Acacia gerrardi var. latisiliqua Brenan; synonyms of var. najdensis: Acacia gerrardi var. najdensis Chaudhary; Acacia gerrardi subsp. negevensis Zohary; Acacia iraqensis Rech.f.; Acacia pachyceras O.Schwartz; Acacia pachyceras var. najdensis (Chaudhary) Boulos; Vachellia gerrardi subsp. negevensis (Zohary) Ragup., Seigler, Ebinger & Maslin

= Vachellia gerrardi =

Species of flowering plant

Vachellia gerrardi is a species of flowering plant in the family Fabaceae. It is a shrub or tree native to seasonally-dry and semi-arid regions of sub-Saharan Africa from Burkina Faso to Ethiopia, Namibia, and KwaZulu Natal, and to the Arabian Peninsula, Iraq, southern Israel, and Sinai Peninsula in southwestern Asia.

Four varieties are accepted.

- Vachellia gerrardi var. calvescens (Brenan) Kyal. & Boatwr. – Kenya and Tanzania
- Vachellia gerrardi var. gerrardi – tropical Africa from Burkina Faso to Ethiopia, Namibia, and KwaZulu-Natal
- Vachellia gerrardi var. latisiliqua (Brenan) Kyal. & Boatwr. – Angola, Kenya, and Tanzania
- Vachellia gerrardi var. najdensis (Chaudhary) Ragup., Seigler, Ebinger & Maslin – Arabian Peninsula, Iraq, southern Israel, and the Sinai Peninsula

In the montane woodlands of Oman's Hajar Mountains, var. najdensis grows in woodland on steep and rocky slopes with Euphorbia larica, Vachellia tortilis, and Periploca aphylla.

The species was first described by George Bentham in 1875. In 2008 P. J. H. Hurter placed the species in genus Vachellia as V. gerrardi.
