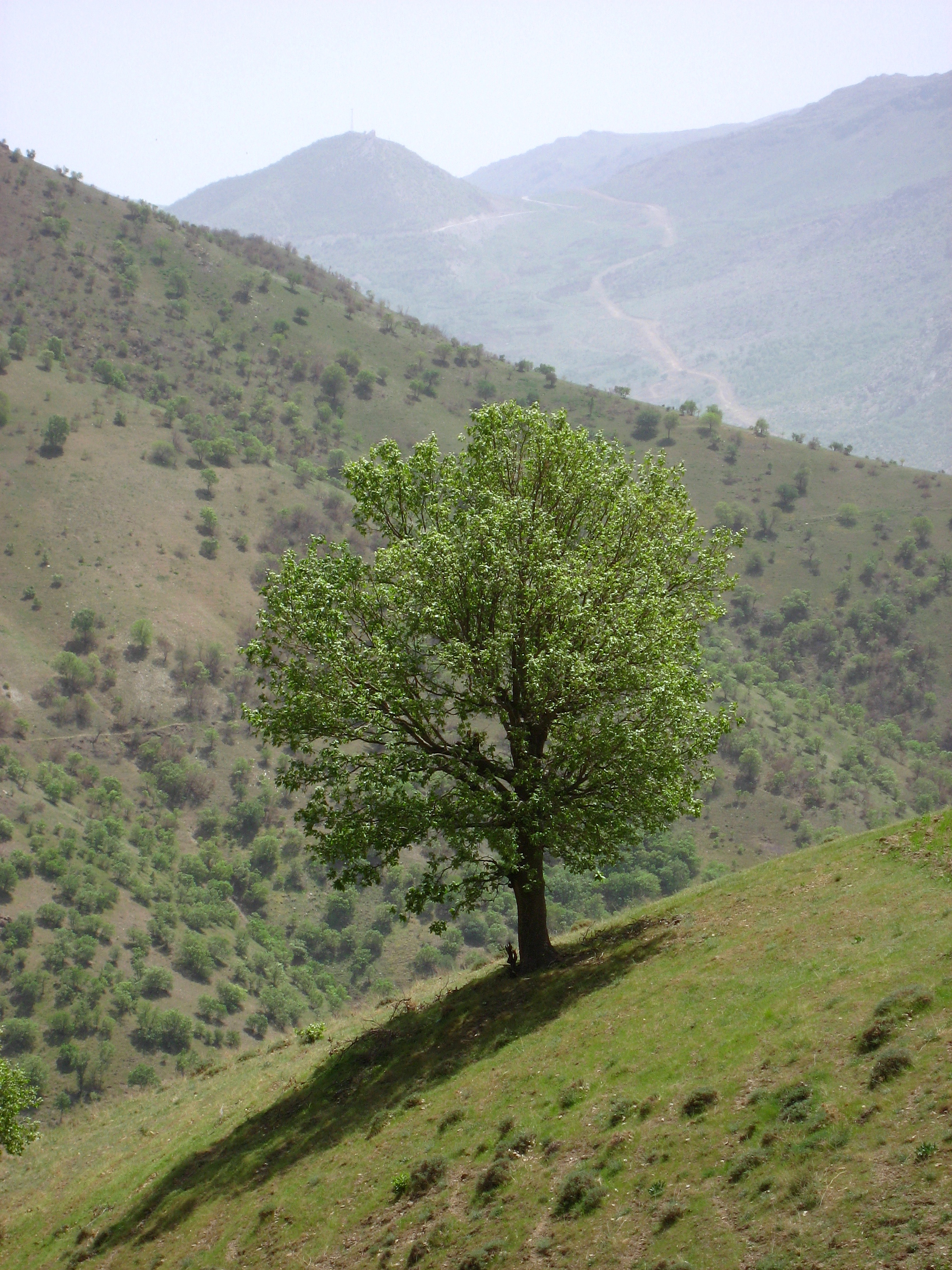

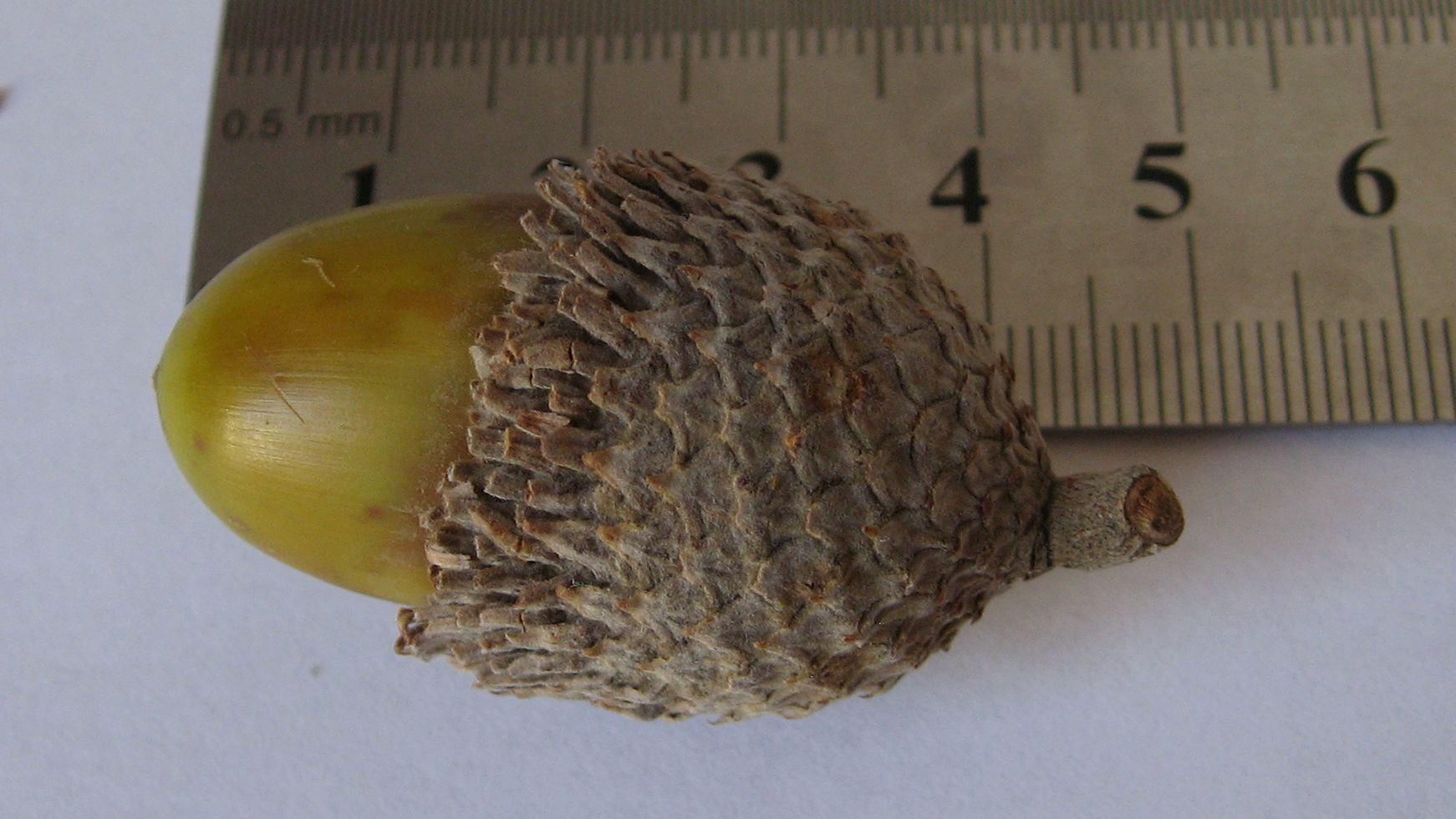

Conservation status
- Least Concern (IUCN 3.1)

Scientific classification
- Kingdom: Plantae
- Clade: Tracheophytes
- Clade: Angiosperms
- Clade: Eudicots
- Clade: Rosids
- Order: Fagales
- Family: Fagaceae
- Genus: Quercus
- Subgenus: Quercus subg. Cerris
- Section: Quercus sect. Cerris
- Species: Q. brantii

Binomial name
- Quercus brantii Lindl.

Synonyms
- List: Quercus aegilops subsp. brantii (Lindl.) A.Camus; Quercus baneica Djav.-Khoie, contrary to Art. 30.5; Quercus brantii subsp. oophora (Kotschy) O.Schwarz; Quercus oophora Kotschy; Quercus squamulosa Djav.-Khoie, contrary to Art. 30.5

= Quercus brantii =

Species of oak tree

Quercus brantii, Brant's oak, is a species of oak native to Western Asia, mainly in Iran, Iraq, Syria, and Turkey.

A shrub or small tree, Quercus brantii grows to between 6 and 15 metres (20 and 49 ft) tall, and has serrated leaves with 5-14 teeth per side.

Quercus brantii (covering more than 50% of the Zagros Mountains forest steppe ecoregion) is the most important tree species of the Zagros Mountains in Iran. It grows in soils derived from limestone at altitudes up to 2200 meters above sea level, and forms communities with other oaks, as well as Pinus brutia, Styrax officinalis, and Paliurus spina-christi.

Iranians use its seed in traditional medicine. Other useful products derived from oaks include fuel wood, charcoal and timber hardwood.
