= Sphaerocoma =

Scientific classification
- Kingdom: Plantae
- Clade: Tracheophytes
- Clade: Angiosperms
- Clade: Eudicots
- Order: Caryophyllales
- Family: Caryophyllaceae
- Genus: Sphaerocoma; T.Anderson
- Species: S. hookeri

Binomial name
- Sphaerocoma hookeri T.Anderson

Genus of plants

Sphaerocoma is a monotypic genus of flowering plants belonging to the family Caryophyllaceae. The only species is Sphaerocoma hookeri.

Its native range is Egypt to Northeastern Tropical Africa (Sudan, Eritrea, and Somalia), Sinai Peninsula, Arabian Peninsula, southern Iran, and southwestern Pakistan.

== Subspecies ==
Two subspecies are recognized:

- Sphaerocoma hookeri subsp. aucheri (Boiss.) Kool & Thulin – Arabian Peninsula, southern Iran, and southwestern Pakistan
- Sphaerocoma hookeri subsp. hookeri – Egypt, Eritrea, Sinai, Socotra, Somalia, Sudan, and Yemen

== Ecology ==
In the South Iran Nubo–Sindian desert and semi-desert ecoregion of southern Iran and southwestern Pakistan, Sphaerocoma hookeri subsp. aucheri in association with Euphorbia larica forms one of the ecoregion's typical plant communities.
