= Quercus magnosquamata =

Scientific classification
- Kingdom: Plantae
- Clade: Embryophytes
- Clade: Tracheophytes
- Clade: Spermatophytes
- Clade: Angiosperms
- Clade: Eudicots
- Clade: Rosids
- Order: Fagales
- Family: Fagaceae
- Genus: Quercus
- Subgenus: Quercus subg. Cerris
- Section: Quercus sect. Cerris
- Species: Q. magnosquamata

Binomial name
- Quercus magnosquamata Djav.-Khoie

Synonyms
- Quercus scalaridentata Djav.-Khoie

Species of flowering plant

Quercus magnosquamata is a species of oak. It is a tree endemic to northwestern Iran, where it grows in forest in the northern Zagros Mountains. The type species was collected in the Chenareh forest of Kurdistan Province at 1580 metres elevation.

The species was described by Karim Djavanchir-Khoie in 1967, but not validly published by the standards of the International Code of Nomenclature for algae, fungi, and plants. The species was validated by Parisa Panahi and Ziba Jamzad in 2018.
