= Quercus ophiosquamata =

Scientific classification
- Kingdom: Plantae
- Clade: Embryophytes
- Clade: Tracheophytes
- Clade: Spermatophytes
- Clade: Angiosperms
- Clade: Eudicots
- Clade: Rosids
- Order: Fagales
- Family: Fagaceae
- Genus: Quercus
- Subgenus: Quercus subg. Cerris
- Section: Quercus sect. Cerris
- Species: Q. ophiosquamata

Binomial name
- Quercus ophiosquamata Djav.-Khoie

Species of flowering plant

Quercus ophiosquamata is a species of oak. It is a tree endemic to Iran. It is native to the Zagros Mountains. The type specimen was collected in forest between Baneh and Armardeh in Kurdistan Province at 1630 metres elevation.

The species was described by Karim Djavanchir-Khoie in 1967, but not validly published by the standards of the International Code of Nomenclature for algae, fungi, and plants. The species was validated by Parisa Panahi and Ziba Jamzad in 2018.
