= Shahina A. Ghazanfar =

Pakistani botanist (born 1949)

Shahina Agha Ghazanfar PhD, ScD (Cantab.) FLS
- Born: 1949 (age 76–77)
- Education: University of the Punjab, University of Cambridge
- Occupation: Botanist

Shahina Agha Ghazanfar (born 1949) is a Pakistani botanist and author best known for her work on plants from the Arabian Peninsula, Pakistan and East Africa.

== Education ==
Ghazanfar studied at the University of the Punjab and the University of Cambridge.

== Professional life ==
Ghazanfar lectured in botany at Kinnaird College in Lahore and at State University of New York. She then worked as a curator and researcher at the National Herbarium in Islamabad.

From 1983, Ghazanfar lectured at Bayero University in Nigeria, where she was keeper of the botanical garden. She founded the herbarium of the university, specialising in collecting plants from northern Nigeria.

In 1987, she became associate professor at Sultan Qaboos University in Oman. She worked there until 1997, creating a herbarium (the second in the country) and supporting the National Herbarium of Oman (in the Museum of Natural History) by providing curatorial support. Ghazanfar edited the Horticultural Association of Oman and Historical Association of Oman newsletters.

From 1997 onwards, Ghazanfar taught and researched the flora of the Arabian Peninsula, especially Oman. She had some grants from Cambridge University and German Academic Exchange Service (DAAD).

From 1999, Ghazanfar was a lecturer and researcher at the University of the South Pacific in Suva. She led a study of the plants of the islands.

In 2001, Ghazanfar became an Academic Visitor to the Department of Plant Sciences in [Newnham College, Cambridge], Cambridge.

From 2001, Ghazanfar has been based at the Royal Botanic Gardens, Kew, where she is an Honorary Research Associate. She is also a Gibbs Fellow at Newnham College, researching on the medicinal plants of the Middle East.

From 2011, she worked extensively on the Flora of Iraq project.

In 2023, Ghazanfar's book on the plants of the Qur'an was published. The New Zealand artist Sue Wickison and Ghazanfar collaborated on an exhibition at the Shirley Sherwood Gallery at the Royal Botanic Gardens, Kew featuring plants named in the Qur'an, which featured alongside the work of Anila Quayyum Agha.

== Research and publications ==
Ghazanfar is known for her work on the vegetation and floras, ethnobotany, and biogeography of plants of the Middle East.

In addition to being a researcher, lecturer and curator, Ghazanfar is a botanical artist who illustrates many of her own books and papers.

=== Selected publications ===
- Handbook of Arabian Medicinal Plants (CRC Press, 1994)
- Vegetation of the Arabian Peninsula with M. Fisher (Springer, 1998)
- Flora of Tropical East Africa (Royal Botanic Gardens, Kew Publishing)
- Trees of Fiji with Gunnar Keppel (Secretariat of the Pacific Community, 2006)
- Flora of Oman (National Botanic Garden, Belgium, 2003–2018)
- Flora of Iraq with John R. Edmondson (Royal Botanic Gardens, Kew Publishing, 2013–2019)
- A Herbal of Iraq with Chris Thorogood (Royal Botanic Gardens, Kew Publishing, 2022)
- Plants of the Qur'an illustrated by Sue Wickison (Royal Botanic Gardens, Kew Publishing, 2023)
- An Ancient Mesopotamian Herbal with Barbara Boek and Mark Nesbitt (Royal Botanic Gardens, Kew Publishing, 2023)

=== Scholarly involvement ===
In 2023 Ghazanfar was awarded the Degree of ScD (Doctor of Science) from the University of Cambridge for her work on the plants of the Middle East. She is a member of the Linnean Society and has been awarded the Linnean Medal for Botany, in 2021. She is also a member of the Association for the Taxonomic Study of the Flora of Tropical Africa, the Society for Arabian Studies, the Society of Economic Botany, and the Arabian Plant Specialist Group contributing to the Species Survival Commission of the International Union for Conservation of Nature.
