= Bijar Protected Area =

- Location within Iran
- Location: Bijar County, Kurdistan, Iran
- Nearest city: Bijar
- Coordinates: 35°52′22″N 47°36′10″E
- Area: 31,612 ha (122.05 sq mi)

Bijar Protected Area is in northeastern Kurdistan province, 15 kilometers from Bijar city. Its area is 31,612 hectares (78,110 acres).
