= Salvia majdae =

Scientific classification
- Kingdom: Plantae
- Clade: Tracheophytes
- Clade: Angiosperms
- Clade: Eudicots
- Clade: Asterids
- Order: Lamiales
- Family: Lamiaceae
- Genus: Salvia
- Species: S. majdae

Binomial name
- Salvia majdae (Rech.f. & Wendelbo) Sytsma

Synonyms
- Zhumeria majdae Rech.f. & Wendelbo

Genus of flowering plants

Salvia majdae is a species of flowering plant in the family Lamiaceae, first described in 1967 as Zhumeria majdae. When placed in the genus Zhumeria, it was the only species. It is a subshrub endemic to southern Iran.
