= Sarmeshk =

Sarmeshk سرمشك
- Village
- Location within Iran
- Coordinates: 29°21′38″N 57°05′47″E
- Country: Iran
- Province: Kerman
- County: Rabor
- Bakhsh: Hanza
- Rural District: Hanza

Population (2012)
  - Total: 1,000
- Time zone: UTC+3:30 (IRST)
  - Summer (DST): UTC+4:30 (IRDT)
- Website: http://geography.kermanedu.ir/Geo_Album_sarmoshk.htm

Sarmeshk (Persian: سرمشك; also known as Sarmoshk) is a village in Hanza Rural District of Rabor County, Kerman Province, Iran. At the 2011 census, its population was 1699.

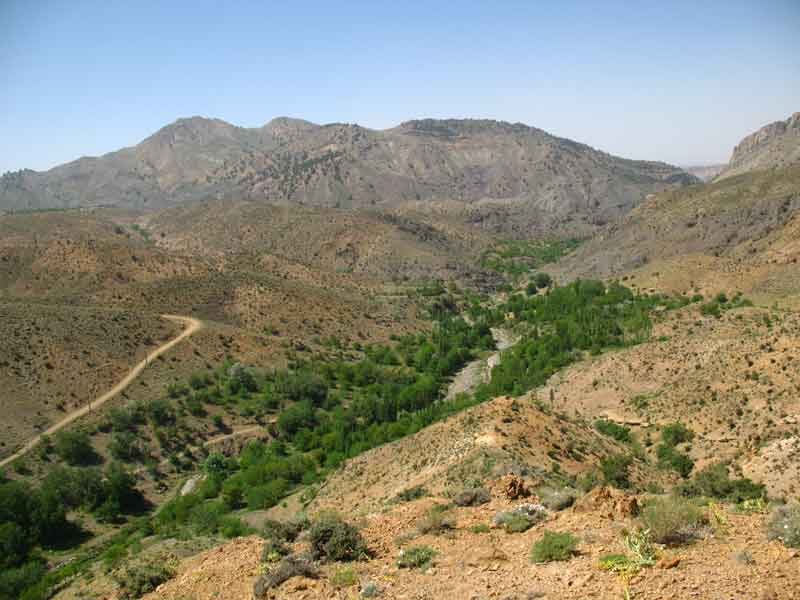
سرمشک

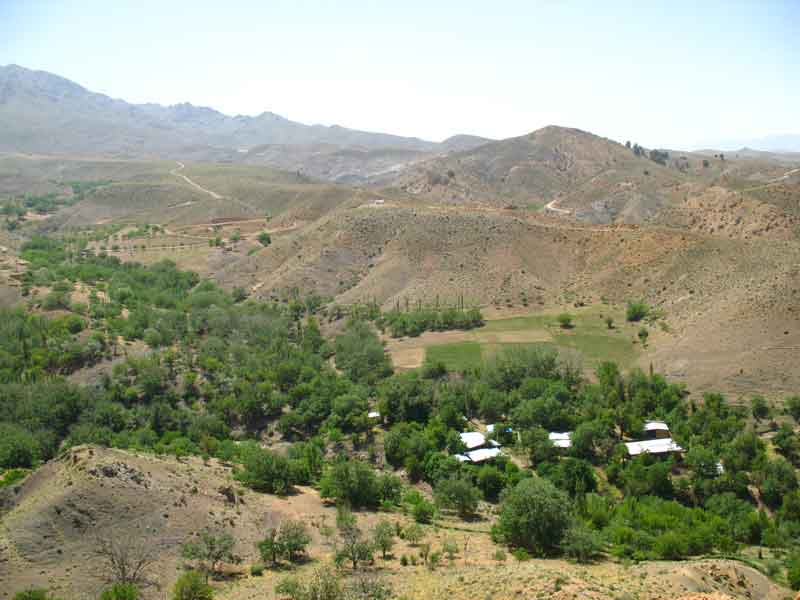
سرمشک

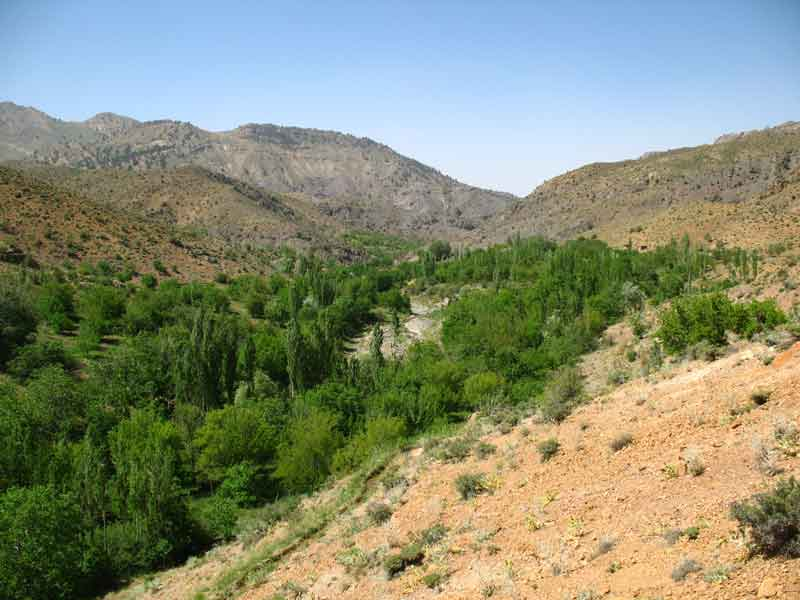
سرمشک

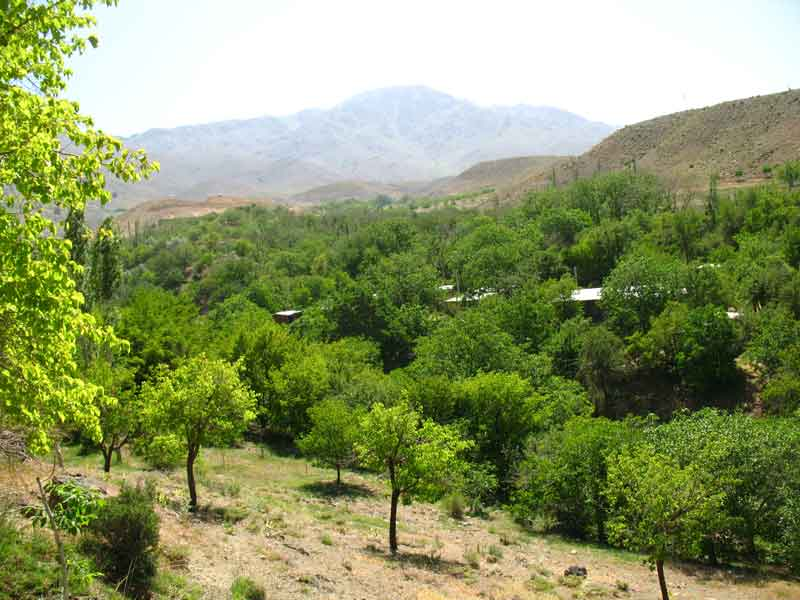
سرمشک

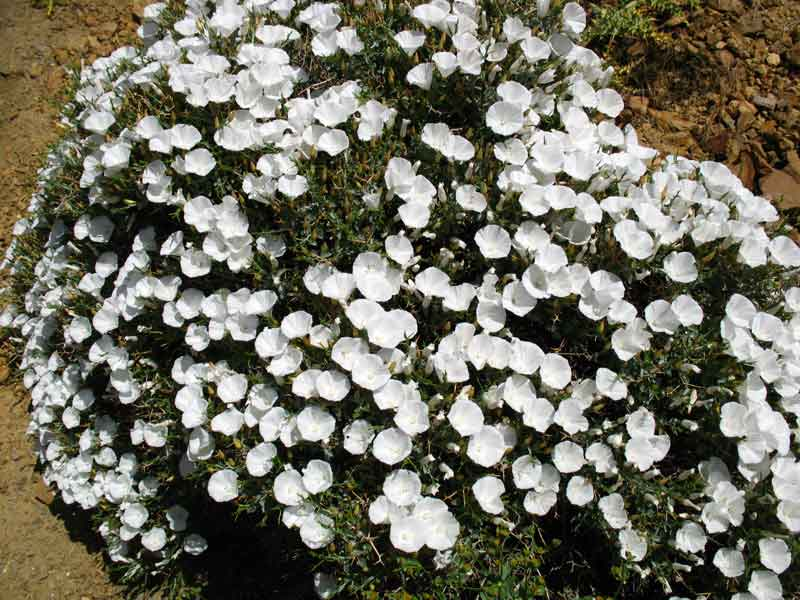
سرمشک

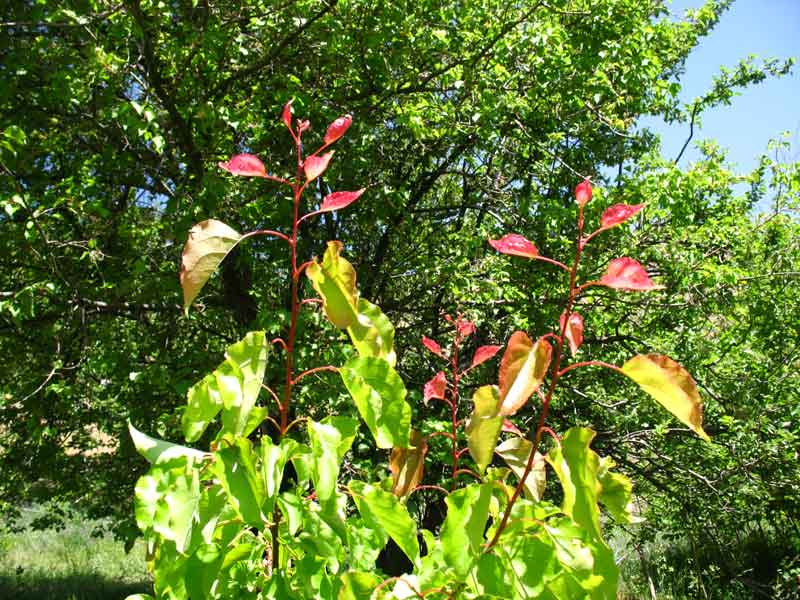
سرمشک

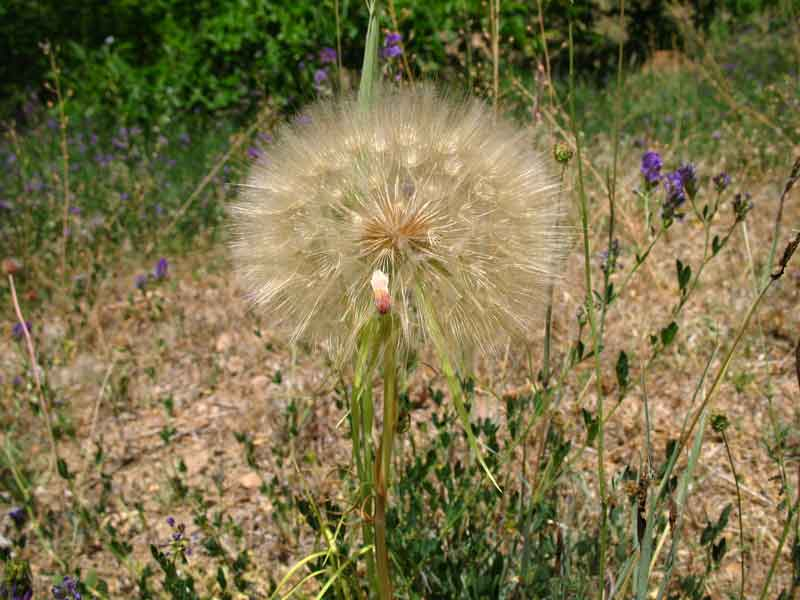
سرمشک

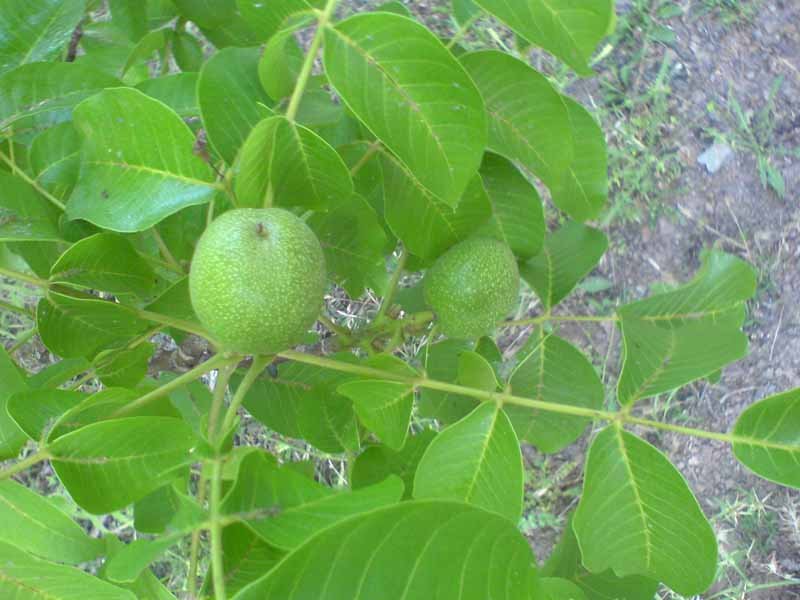
سرمشک

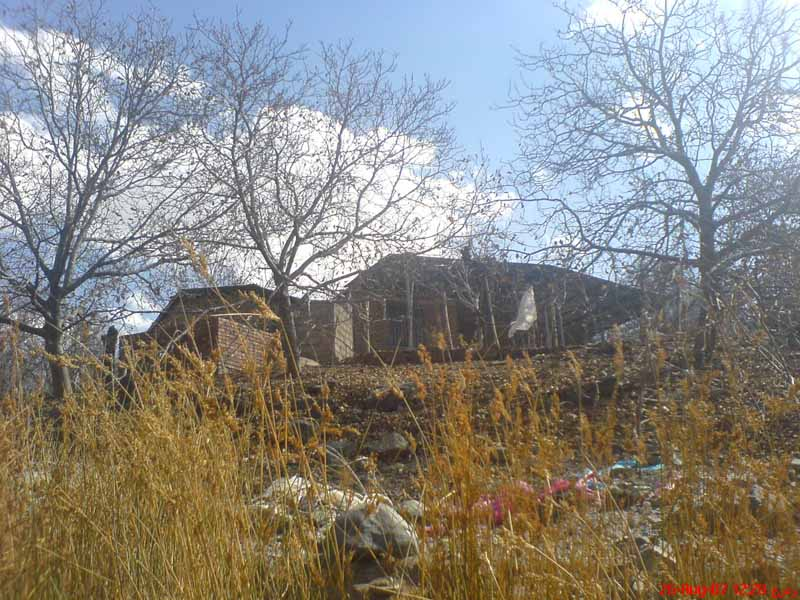
سرمشک
