= Meleh Galeh =

Meleh Galeh مله گاله
- Village
- Location within Iran
- Coordinates: 29°19′15″N 52°15′55″E
- Country: Iran
- Province: Fars
- County: Shiraz
- Bakhsh: Central
- Rural District: Siyakh Darengun

Population (2006)
  - Total: 150
- Time zone: UTC+3:30 (IRST)
  - Summer (DST): UTC+4:30 (IRDT)

Meleh Galeh (Persian: مله گاله, also Romanized as Meleh Gāleh and Moleh Gāleh; also known as Meleh Gāleh-ye Jadīd and Mol-e Gāleh) is a village in Siyakh Darengun Rural District, in the Central District of Shiraz County, Fars province, Iran. At the 2006 census, its population was 150, in 36 families.
