= Sorkheh Hesar National Park =

National park in Tehran County, Iran

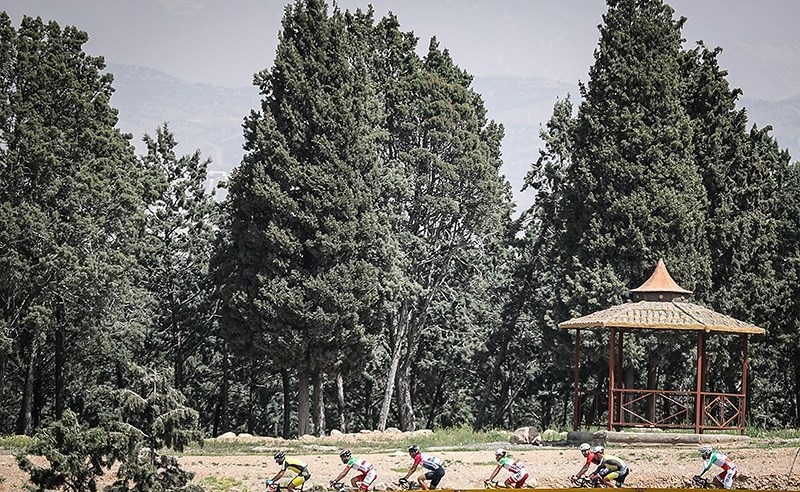
- Interactive map of Sorkheh Hesar National Park
- Location: Tehran, Iran
- Nearest city: Ray
- Coordinates: 35°38′18″N 51°34′46″E
- Area: 9,380 ha (23,200 acres)
- Established: 1931 (as royal hunting ground); 1980 (as national park)

Sorkheh Hesar National Park (Persian: پارک ملی سرخه‌حصار) lies with an area of 9,380 hectares (23,200 acres) and stands at an altitude of 1,547 metres (5,075 ft) above sea-level, near by Ray - Tehran 20th District, Tehran, Iran. The whole of this forest park, except the northeastern part has been managed by Iran Environmental Protection Organization since 1980. The major portion of this territory is a base for migrating birds during winter.

== Environment ==
The area has semi-arid climate and the day-night temperature difference is very high. The maximum temperature annual average in the area is 18.9 °C (66.0 °F). Jajrood River ( also protected) flows in this area, continues to the side of the area after passing Latyan Dam, and leaves the area in Parchin Township.

== Geography ==
Access to this park can be gained from the Khojir Road and Qasr-e-Firoozeh Roads.

== Wildlife and hunting ==
Various animals live in this national park including Persian fallow deer, red fox, cape hare, Persian leopard, golden eagle, hawk, and different snakes. Although the Sorkheh Hesar park used to be a hunting ground, today any hunting activity is strictly prohibited.

== Gallery ==
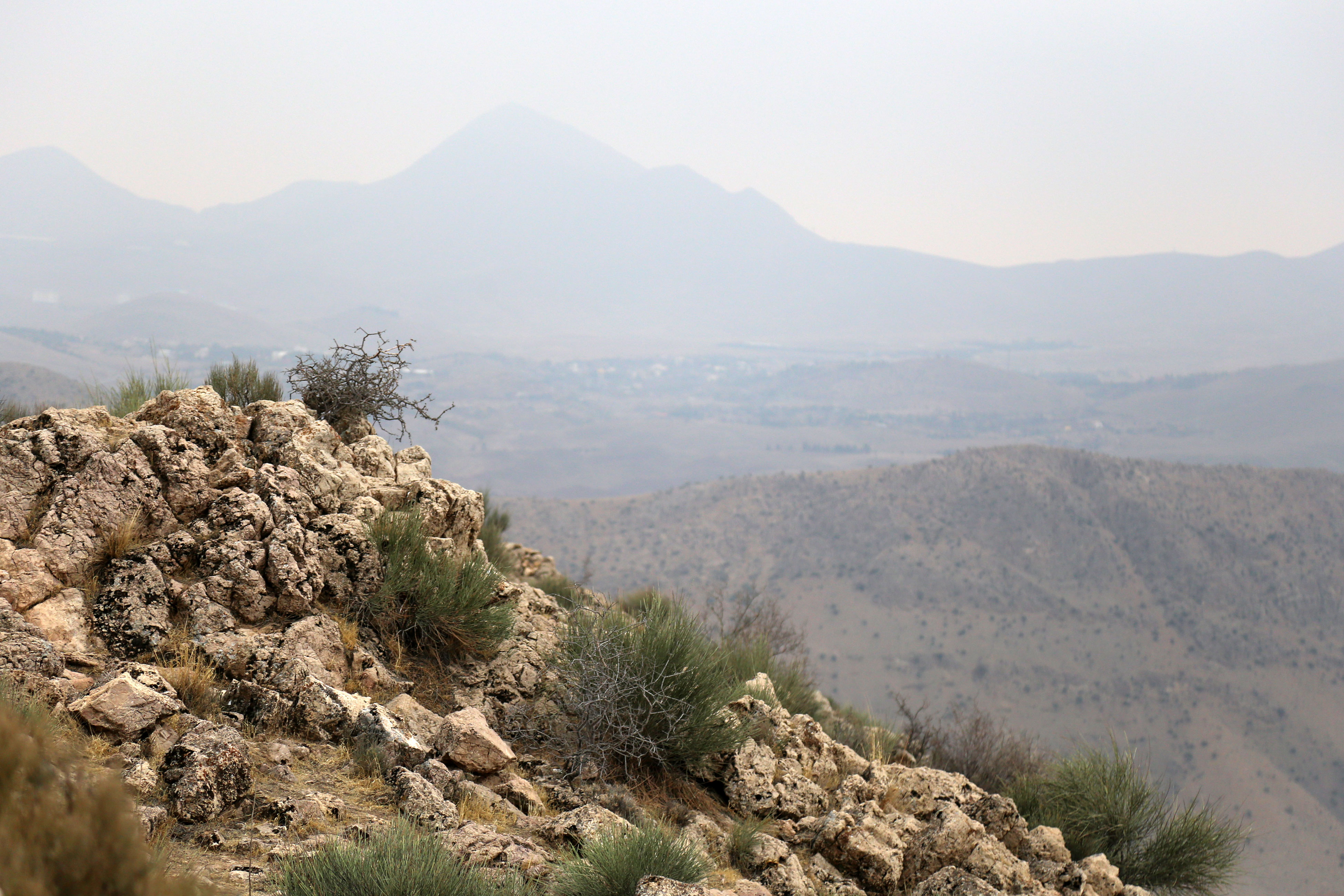
Mount Sorkheh Hesar, Tehran, Iran

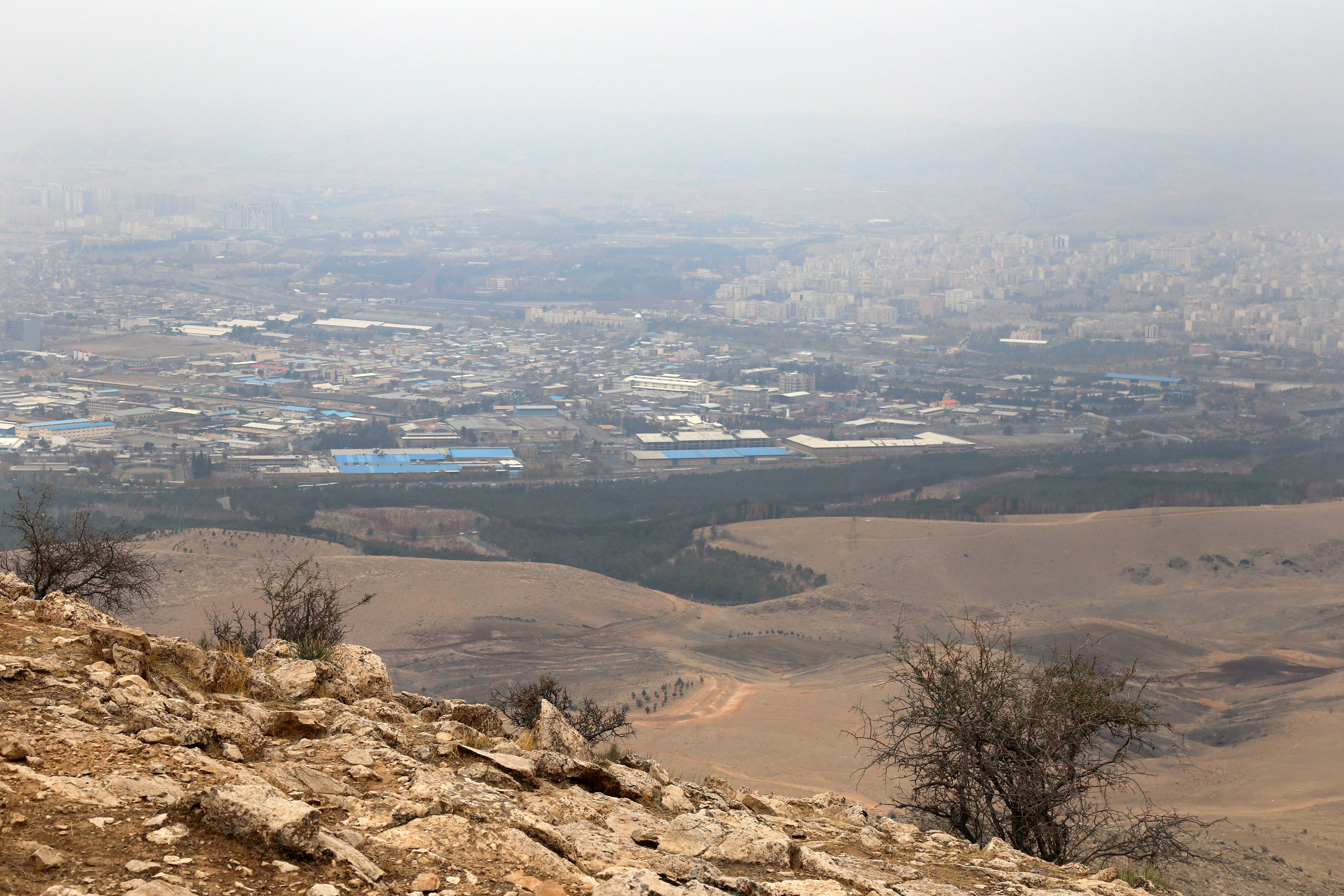
Mount Sorkheh Hesar, Tehran, Iran

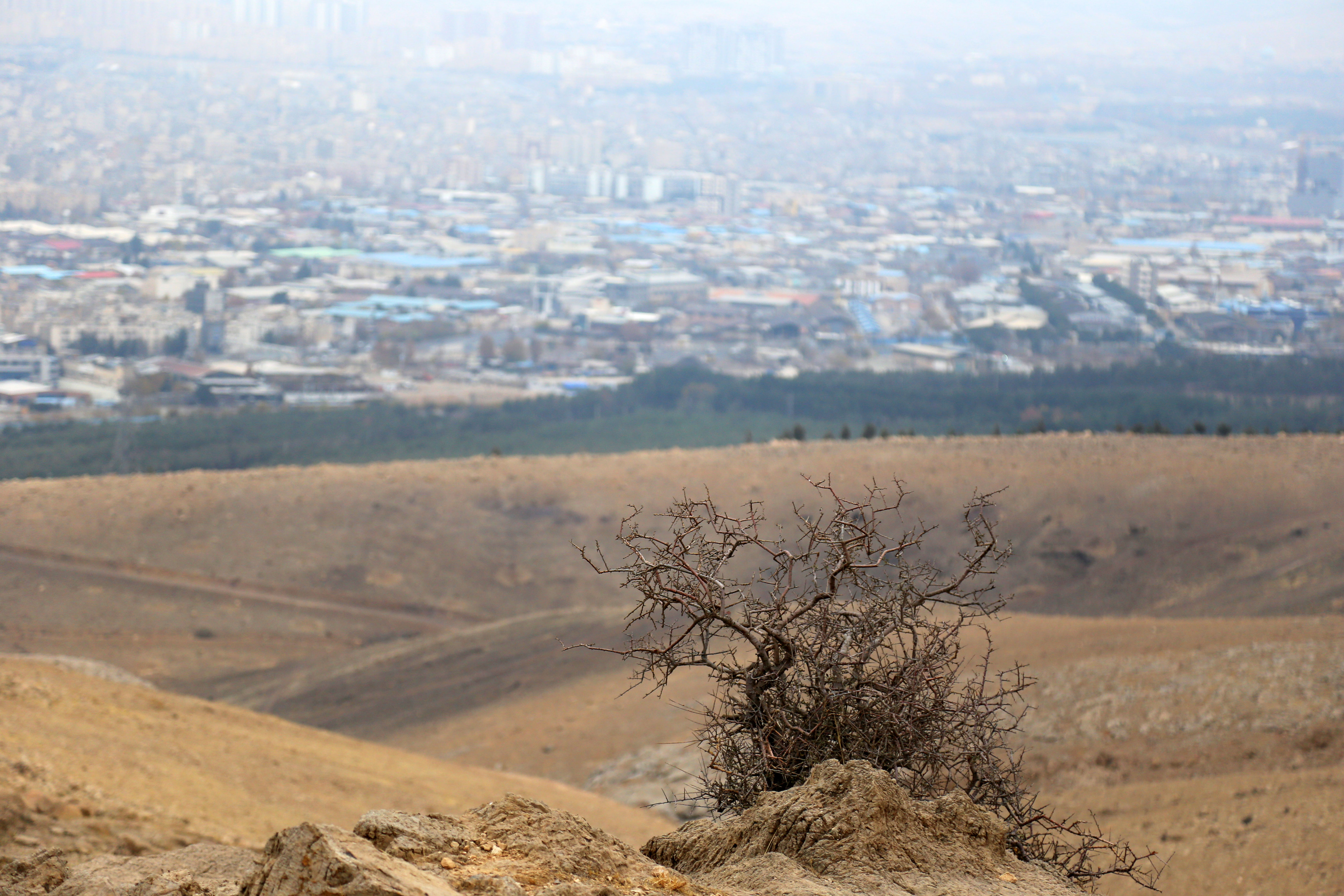
Mount Sorkheh Hesar, Tehran, Iran

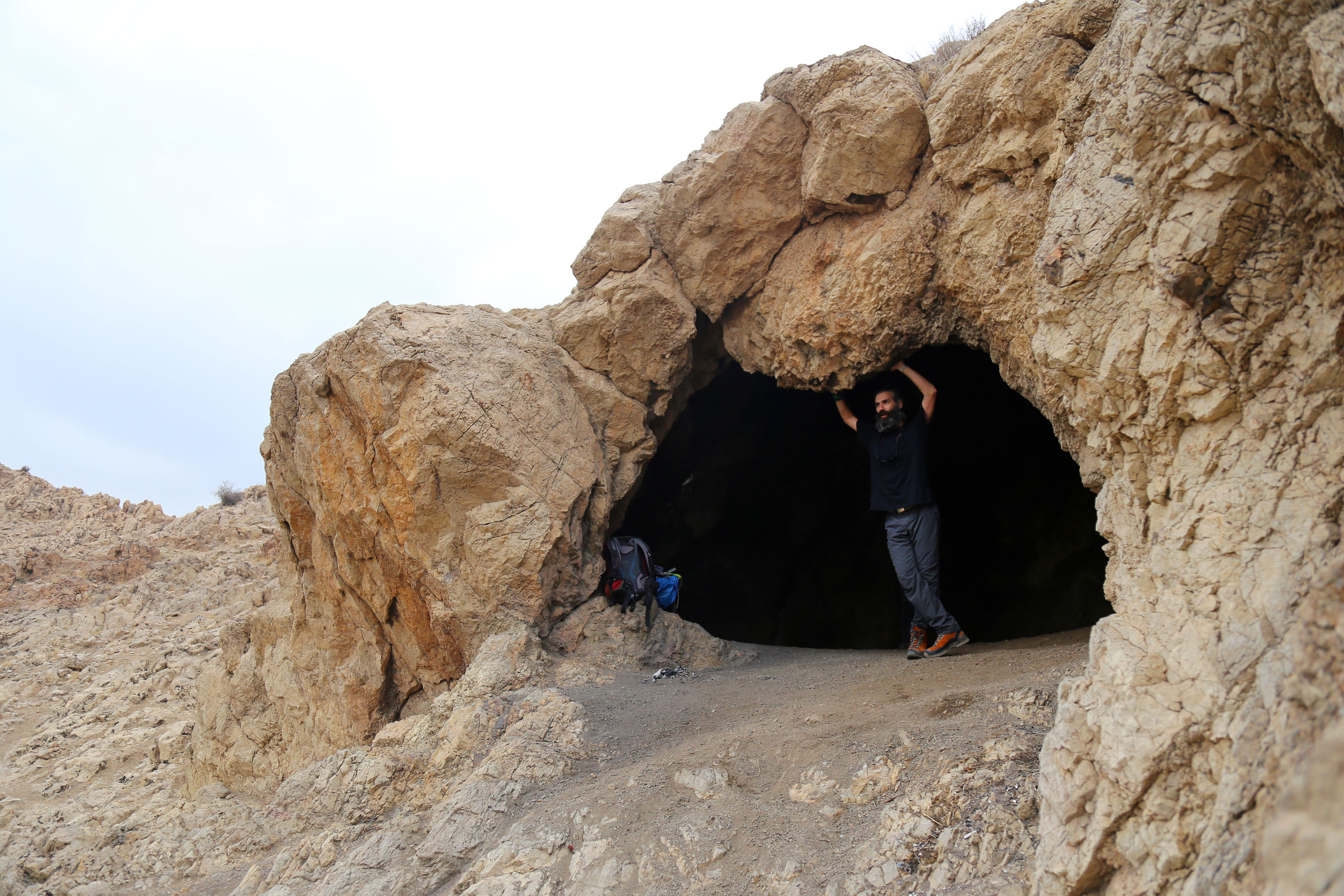
Mount Sorkheh Hesar, Tehran, Iran

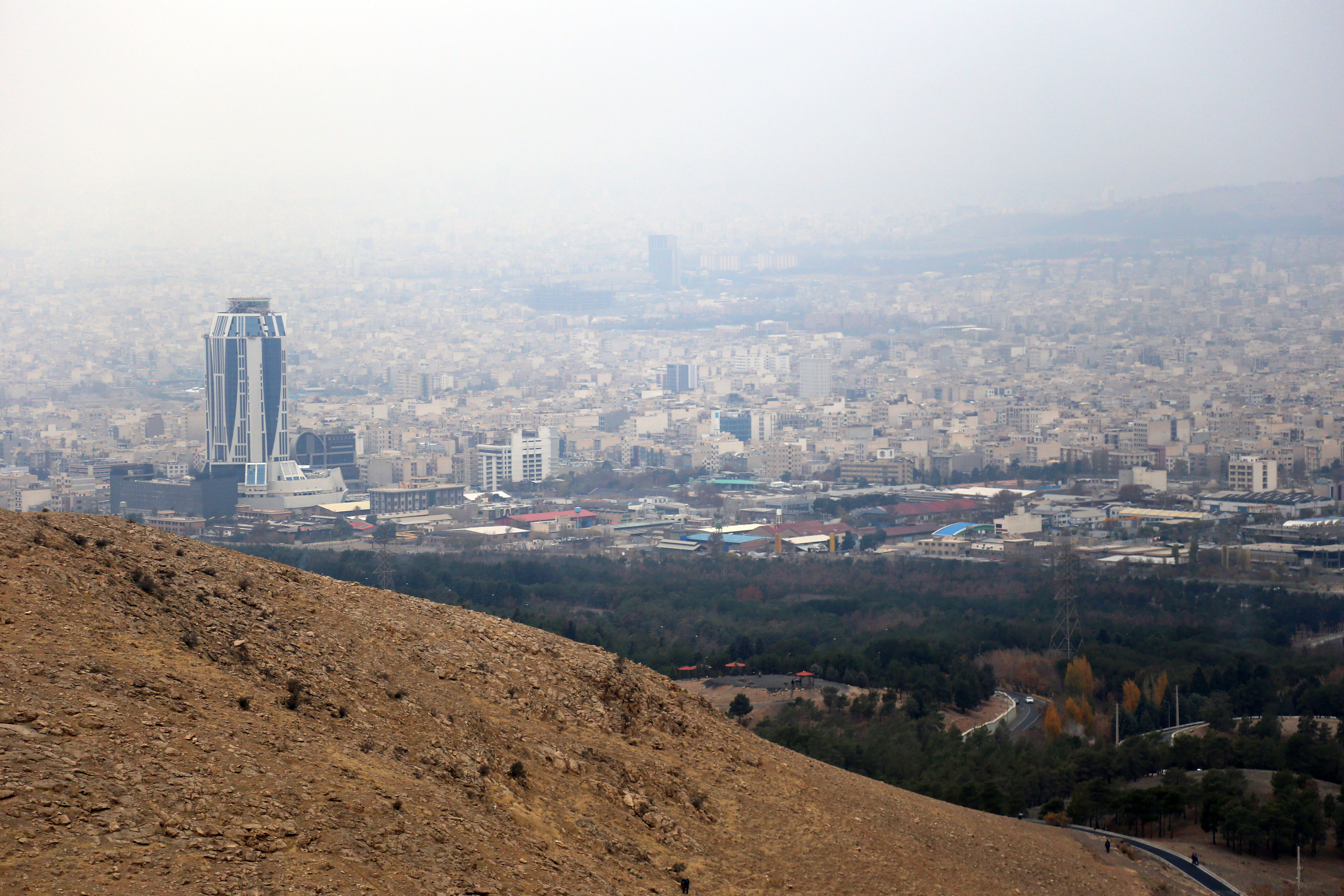
Mount Sorkheh Hesar, Tehran, Iran

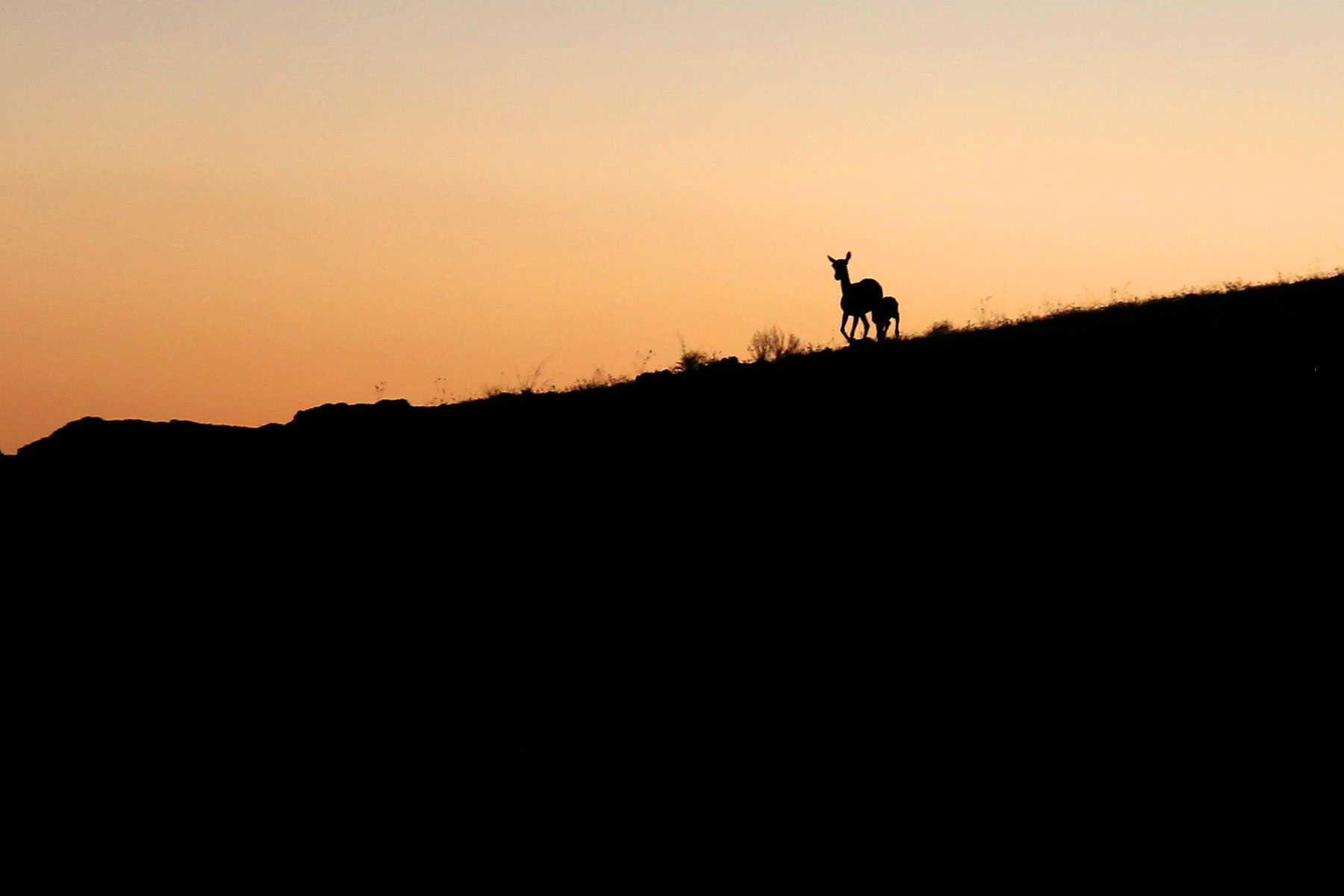
Sorkheh Hesar National Park

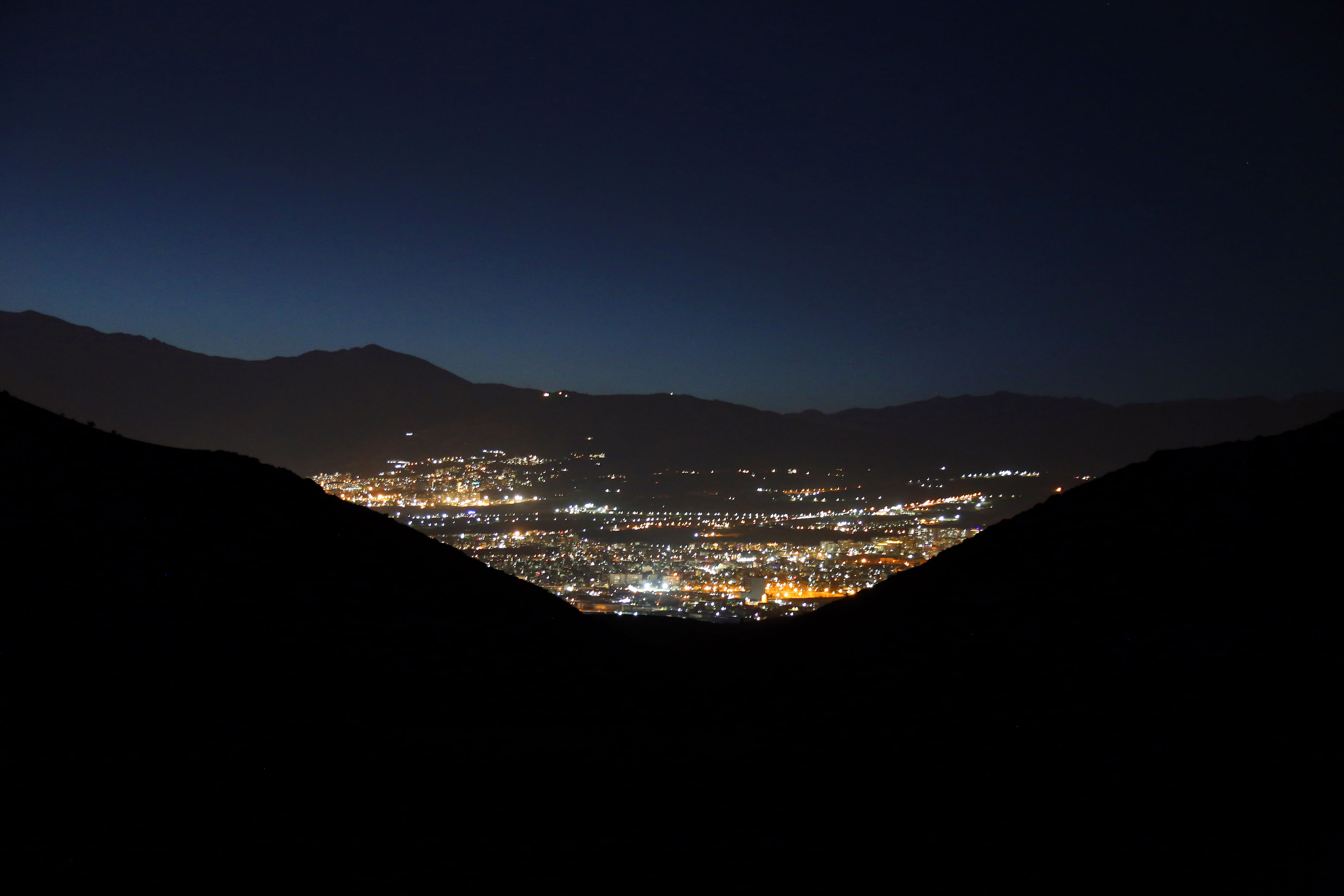
Tehran from Sorkheh Hesar
