= Central Persian desert basins =

Ecoregion in Iran and Afghanistan

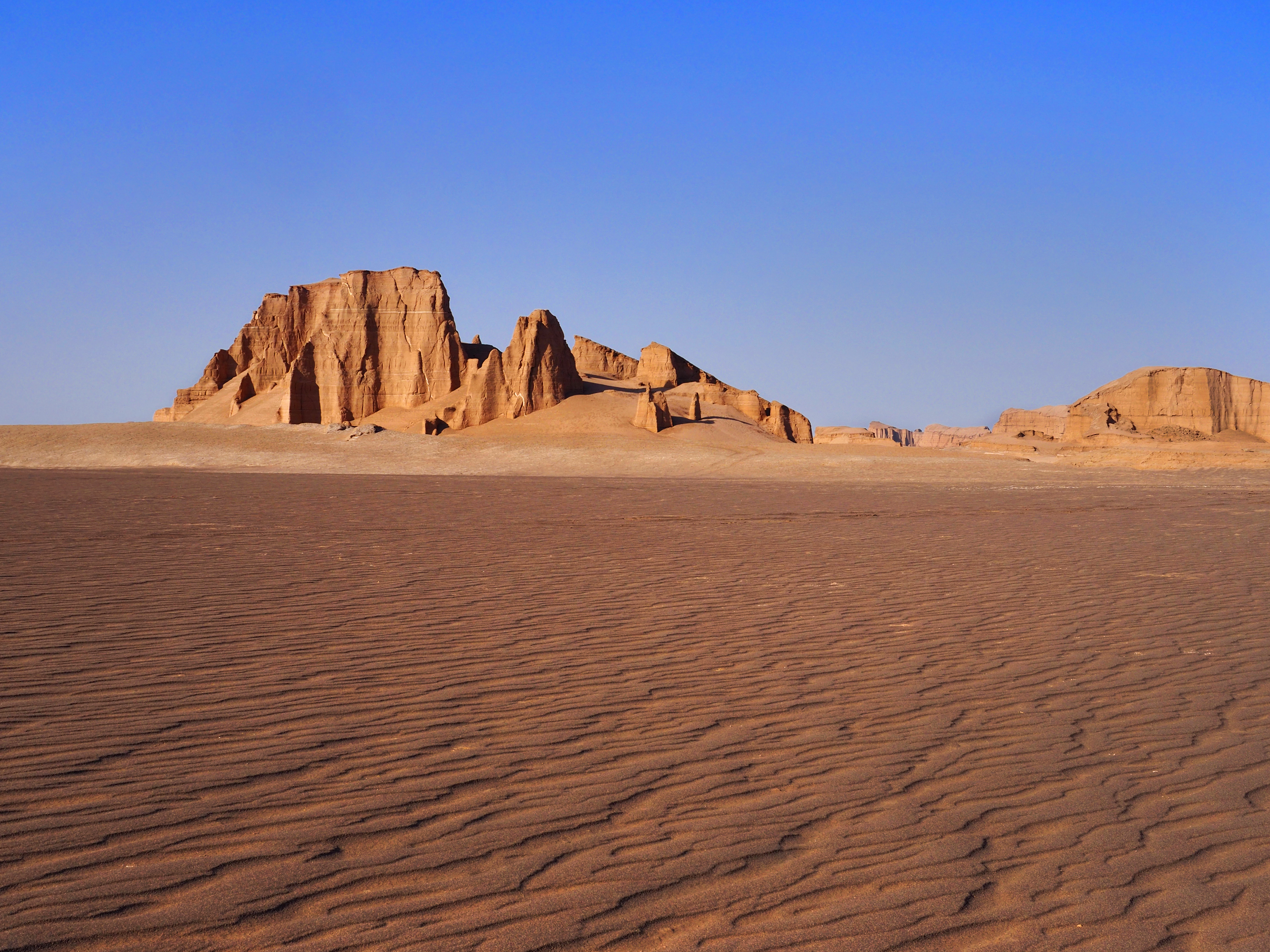
- Dasht-e Lut - Kerman Province, Iran

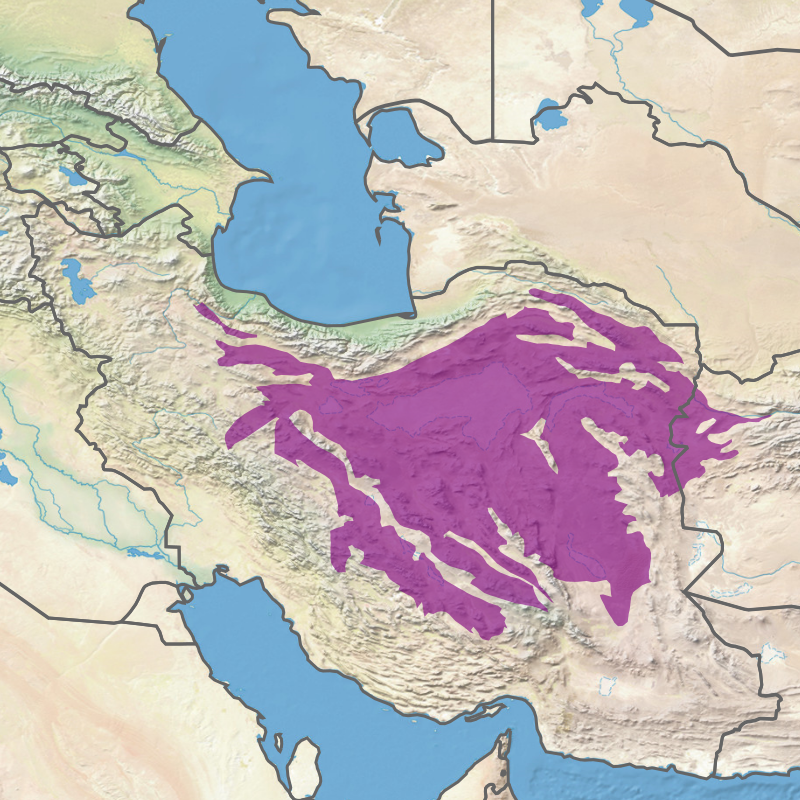
- Ecoregion territory (in purple)

Ecology
- Realm: Palearctic
- Biome: Deserts and xeric shrublands

Geography
- Area: 582,193 km^{2} (224,786 mi^{2})
- Country: Iran, Afghanistan
- Coordinates: 33.75°N 54.75°E

The Central Persian desert basins ecoregion (WWF ID: PA1313) covers the arid steppe and desert basins of central Iran, stretching into northwestern Afghanistan. The ecoregion extends over the Central Iranian Plateau, which is surrounded by mountain ranges and has no outlets to the sea. Much of the terrain is hot sand-and-gravel desert and large salt flats. The vegetation includes many specialized species of halophytes (salt-tolerant), xerophytes (drought-tolerant), and psammophile (sand-loving) plants.

== Location and description ==
The ecoregion is bounded on the west and south by the Zagros Mountains, on the north by the Alborz Mountains (Elbruz) along the Caspian Sea, on the northeast by the Kopet Dag mountains on the border with Turkmenistan, and on the east by a series of lower ranges along the border with Afghanistan. Higher elevation mountain ridges of the Kuh Rud and Eastern Iran montane woodlands ecoregion, which intrude into the plateau. In the north of the basin is the large Dasht-e Kavir (a salt desert), in the east and south is the Dasht-e Lut (a sand and gravel desert), and there are portions of the plateau covered in large sand dunes. The average elevation is 900 metres (3,000 ft).

Some areas receive water run-off from nearby mountains in the spring, but the water is mostly lost to evaporation by summer. In the northwest is Namak Lake, a significant complex of saline lake, salt marsh and salt flats.

== Climate ==
The climate of ecoregion is Semi-arid (Köppen climate classification (BSh)). This climate is characteristic of steppes, with hot summers and cool or mild winters, and minimal precipitation. The coldest month averages above 0 °C (32 °F). The ecoregion experiences great extremes in temperature, ranging from lows of −20 °C (−4 °F) to highs of 42 °C (108 °F).

== Flora and fauna ==
The flora of the ecoregion is highly dependent on the soil and moisture characteristics of the locality. In the broad interior basins, the more common ground cover is dwarf scrub of genus Artemisia (genus) (sagebrush) and Astragalus. In the more arid regions the cover is open, with a rich variety of halophytic and xerophytic species. Areas with more precipitation support the addition of thorn-cushion plants. The sand deserts support Ephedra, Calligonum, and Heliotropium. The margins of the gravel deserts support a wide variety of Tamarix plants.

On the margins of the salt pans of the Dasht-e Kavir, representative plants include genus Halothamnus, (from the Greek 'hals' (salt) and 'thamnos' (bush)), Halocnemum strobilaceum, Haloxylon (common name saxaul), and Salsola (from Latin salsus (salty)).

Mammals that were once associated with this area are now greatly reduced in number and mostly sighted in protected areas. These include the now-critically endangered Asiatic cheetah (Acinonyx jubatus, subspecies venaticus), the near threatened Striped hyena (Hyaena hyaena), the Argali (Ovis ammon), the endangered Mountain gazelle (Gazella gazella), the vulnerable leopard (Panthera pardus), and the vulnerable Marbled polecat (Vormela peregusna).

== Protected areas ==
Over 12% of the ecoregion is officially protected. These protected areas include:

- Kavir National Park
- Khojir National Park
- Sorkheh Hesar National Park
- Khar Turan National Park
