= List of national parks of Pakistan =

As of 2023, Pakistan has 37 national parks (Urdu: پاکستان کے نیشنل پارک) that are recognised by World Database on Protected Areas. In 2012, 25 of these were under supervision of respective provincial governments and remaining were in private care. Only some of these are under the conservation scope of International Union for Conservation of Nature (IUCN). Protection and conservation of the environment of Pakistan was included in the concurrent constitution of 1973. As a result, Environment Protection Ordinance was enacted in 1983, which was mainly regulated by the Environment and Urban Affairs Division. Later, a new system of 'Modern Protected Areas' legislation began at the provincial level which assigned the protected areas with designations such as national parks, wildlife sanctuaries and game reserves. Further recommendations of the national parks of the Indomalayan realm were highlighted in the IUCN review of 1986. Nevertheless, the development of national parks was mainly carried out by National Conservation Strategy of 1992. Due to more awareness about their importance in conservation of biodiversity, 10 national parks have been established during the time period from 1993 to 2005.

According to the 'Modern Protected Areas' legislation, a national park is a protected area set aside by the government for the protection and conservation of its outstanding scenery and wildlife in a natural state. It is accessible to public for research, education and recreation. In order to promote public use, construction of roads and rest houses is permitted. Use of firearms, polluting water, cleaning of land for cultivation, destruction of wildlife is banned in these areas.

The oldest national park is Lal Suhanra in Bahawalpur District, established in 1972. Lal Suhanra is the only national park established before the independence of the nation in August 1947. The main purpose of this area was to protect the wildlife of Cholistan Desert. Central Karakoram in Gilgit-Baltistan is currently the largest national park in the country, spanning over a total approximate area of 1,390,100 hectares (3,435,011.9 acres). The smallest national park is the Ayubia, covering a total approximate area of 3,312 hectares (8,184.1 acres).

National Parks of Pakistan
| Click on a 'mark' to open the article of the respective national park | 1. Ayub; 2. Ayubia; 3. Broghil Valley; 4. Central Karakorum; 5. Chinji; 6. Chitral Gol; 7. Deosai; 8. Deva Vatala; 9. Nanga Parbat; 10. Ghamot; 11. Gurez; 12. Hazarganji-Chiltan; 13. Himalaya; 14. Hingol; 15. Kala Chitta; 16. Khunjerab; 17. Kirthar; 18. Lal Suhanra; 19. Lulusar-Dudipatsar; 20. Machiara; 21. Margalla Hills; 22. Murree-Kotli Sattian-Kahuta; 23. Pir Lasura; 24. Poonch River Mahaseer; 25. Qurumbar; 26. Saiful Muluk; 27. Salt Range; 28. Shandur-Hundrap; 29. Sheikh Badin; 30. Toli Pir; 31. Ziarat; Region key Islamabad Capital Territory Azad Kashmir Balochistan Gilgit–Baltistan Khyber Pakhtunkhwa Punjab Sindh |

== List ==
| S.No | National park | Image | Established | Area | District(s) | Administrative unit(s) | Notable Wildlife | Coordinates |
|---|---|---|---|---|---|---|---|---|
| 1 | Ayubia | | 1984 | 3,312 ha (8,184 acres) | Abbottabad | Khyber Pakhtunkhwa | Indian leopard, Himalayan goral, Red giant flying squirrel | 33°51′54.83″N 73°8′19.57″E |
| 2 | Broghil Valley | | 2010 | 134,744 ha (332,960 acres) | Chitral | Khyber Pakhtunkhwa | Snow leopard, Siberian ibex, Turkestan lynx | 36.841164°N 73.335697°E |
| 3 | Central Karakoram | | 1993 | 1,390,100 ha (3,435,012 acres) | Hunza-Nagar , Skardu and Shigar | Gilgit Baltistan | Snow leopard, Markhor, Siberian ibex, Bharal | 36.897708°N 75.093545°E |
| 4 | Chitral Gol | | 1984 | 7,750 ha (19,151 acres) | Chitral | Khyber Pakhtunkhwa | Markhor, Snow leopard, Himalayan black bear | 35.933082°N 71.670693°E |
| 5 | Chinji | | 1987 | 6,095 ha (15,061 acres) | Chakwal | Punjab | Indian wolf, Urial, Bengal fox | 33.010242°N 72.491940°E |
| 6 | Deosai | | 1993 | 358,400 ha (885,626 acres) | Skardu | Gilgit Baltistan | Himalayan brown bear, Long-tailed marmot, Snow leopard, Himalayan wolf | 34.972626°N 75.396423°E |
| 7 | Deva Vatala | | 2009 | 2,993 ha (7,396 acres) | Bhimber | Azad Kashmir | Indian leopard, Indian hog deer, Nilgai | 32.892583°N 74.303172°E |
| 8 | Nanga Parbat | | 1995 | 10,000 ha (24,711 acres) | Diamer | Gilgit-Baltistan | Kashmir musk deer, Markhor,Himalayan brown bear, Snow leopard | 35.350277777778°N 74.858888888889°E |
| 9 | Ghamot | | 2004 | 27,271 ha (67,388 acres) | Neelum | Azad Kashmir | Kashmir musk deer | 35.006943°N 74.200287°E |
| 10 | Hazarganji-Chiltan | | 1980 | 15,555 ha (38,437 acres) | Quetta | Balochistan | Wild goat, Markhor, Persian leopard | 30.285695°N 67.202298°E |
| 11 | Hingol | | 1988 | 165,004 ha (407,734 acres) | Awaran, Gwadar and Lasbela | Balochistan | Chinkara, Urial, Persian leopard, Wild goat | 25.526246°N 65.085996°E |
| 12 | Hundrap-Shandur | | 1993 | 51,800 ha (128,001 acres) | Gupis-Yasin | Gilgit Baltistan | Siberian ibex, Snow leopard, Turkestan lynx | 33.865231°N 73.138768°E |
| 13 | Kala Chitta | | 2009 | 36,965 ha (91,343 acres) | Attock | Punjab | Urial, Chinkara, Indian leopard | 33.642685°N 72.400824°E |
| 14 | Khunjerab | | 1975 | 226,913 ha (560,714 acres) | Hunza | Gilgit Baltistan | Marco Polo sheep, Bharal, Kiang, Snow leopard, Siberian ibex | 36.500805°N 75.643616°E |
| 15 | Kheri Murat National Park | | 2023 | 3,537 ha (8,740 acres) | Attock | Punjab | Urial | |
| 16 | Kirthar | | 1974 | 308,733 ha (762,896 acres) | Dadu | Sindh | Chinkara, Wild goat, Urial, Leopard | 25.658107°N 67.548975°E |
| 17 | Lal Suhanra | | 1972 | 87,426 ha (216,034 acres) | Bahawalpur | Punjab | Blackbuck, Indian hog deer, Nilgai | 29.397409°N 72.025811°E |
| 18 | Lulusar-Dudipatsar | | 2003 | 30,375 ha (75,058 acres) | Mansehra | Khyber Pakhtunkhwa | Snow leopard, Long-tailed marmot, Himalayan black bear | 35.090698°N 73.929749°E |
| 19 | Machiara | | 1996 | 13,532 ha (33,438 acres) | Muzaffarabad | Azad Kashmir | Himalayan black bear, Kashmir musk deer, Nepal gray langur, Indian leopard | 34.506557°N 73.565140°E |
| 20 | Manglot | | 1990 | 710.628 ha (1,756 acres) | Nowshera | Khyber Pakhtunkhwa | Chinkara, Leopard | 36.10°N 73.23°E |
| 21 | Margalla Hills | | 1980 | 17,386 ha (42,962 acres) | Islamabad, Rawalpindi | Punjab | Northern red muntjac, Indian leopard, Leopard cat, Indian wolf, Rhesus macaque, Masked palm civet | 33.754317°N 72.956429°E |
| 22 | Musk Deer | | 2009 | 52,815 ha (130,509 acres) | Neelum | Azad Kashmir | Kashmir musk deer,Himalayan black bear | 34.731456°N 74.786682°E |
| 23 | Pabbi and Rasul Reserve Forest | | 2023 | 14,720 ha (36,374 acres) | Mandi Bahauddin and Gujrat | Punjab | Golden jackal, Wild boar | |
| 24 | Panjal Mastan | | 2005 | 5,045 ha (12,466 acres) | Bagh | Azad Kashmir | Kashmir musk deer, Indian leopard | 34.0574°N 73.7381°E |
| 25 | Pir Lasura National Park | | 2005 | 5,625 ha (13,900 acres) | Kotli | Azad Kashmir | Northern red muntjac, Indian leopard | 33.639204°N 73.846664°E |
| 26 | Poonch River Mahaseer | | 2010 | 4,500 ha (11,120 acres) | Kotli, Mirpur and Poonch | Azad Kashmir | | 33.555272°N 73.91599°E |
| 27 | Qurumbar | | 2011 | 74,000 ha (182,858 acres) | Ghizer | Gilgit-Baltistan | Snow leopard, Pallas's cat, Siberian ibex,Himalayan brown bear | 36.863141°N 73.781038°E |
| 28 | Saiful Muluk | | 2003 | 4,867 ha (12,027 acres) | Mansehra | Khyber Pakhtunkhwa | Himalayan black bear, Snow leopard, Turkestan lynx | 34.880862°N 73.698349°E |
| 29 | Salt Range | | 2021 | 17,600 ha (43,491 acres) | Chakwal | Punjab | Urial, Chinkara,Indian leopard, Indian wolf | 32.8322°N 72.6151°E |
| 30 | Sheikh Badin | | 1993 | 15,540 ha (38,400 acres) | Dera Ismail Khan | Khyber Pakhtunkhwa | Cape hare, Golden jackal, Indian wolf | 32.382281°N 70.949707°E |
| 31 | Takatu Park | | 2025 | 13,524 ha (33,419 acres) | Quetta & Pishin Districts | Balochistan | Marbled polecat, Indian wolf, Golden jackal | 30.2992°N 67.1420°E |
| 32 | Tilla Reserve | | 2021 | 8,840 ha (21,844 acres) | Jhelum | Punjab | Indian pangolin, Golden jackal, Indian crested porcupine | 32.9425°N 73.7257°E |
| 33 | Toli Pir | | 2005 | 5,045 ha (12,466 acres) | Poonch | Azad Kashmir | Asian black bear, Indian leopard | 34.12090°N 73.633118°E |
| 34 | Ziarat | | 2021 | 21,450 ha (53,004 acres) | Ziarat | Balochistan | Markhor, Marbled polecat, Balochistan black bear, Urial | 30.3939°N 67.7169°E |
| 35 | Koh-e-Sulaiman | | 2021 | 30,000 ha (74,132 acres) | Dera Ismail Khan | Khyber Pakhtunkhwa | Markhor, Urial, Persian leopard | 32.0000°N 70.2959°E |
| 36 | Thub Patri | | 2015 | | Bhimber | Azad Kashmir | | |
| 37 | Himalaya | | 2020 | 198,900 ha (491,493 acres) | Astore | Gilgit Baltistan | Siberian ibex, Markhor, Snow leopard | 35.350277777778°N 74.858888888889°E |
| 38 | Murree Kotli Sattian | | 2009 | 57,581 ha (142,286 acres) | Rawalpindi | Punjab | Indian leopard, Rhesus macaque, Himalayan goral | 33.739032°N 73.471344°E |

== See also ==
- Protected areas of Pakistan
