= Aravalli West Thorn Scrub Forests =

Ecoregion of Pakistan and India

Northwestern thorn scrub forests
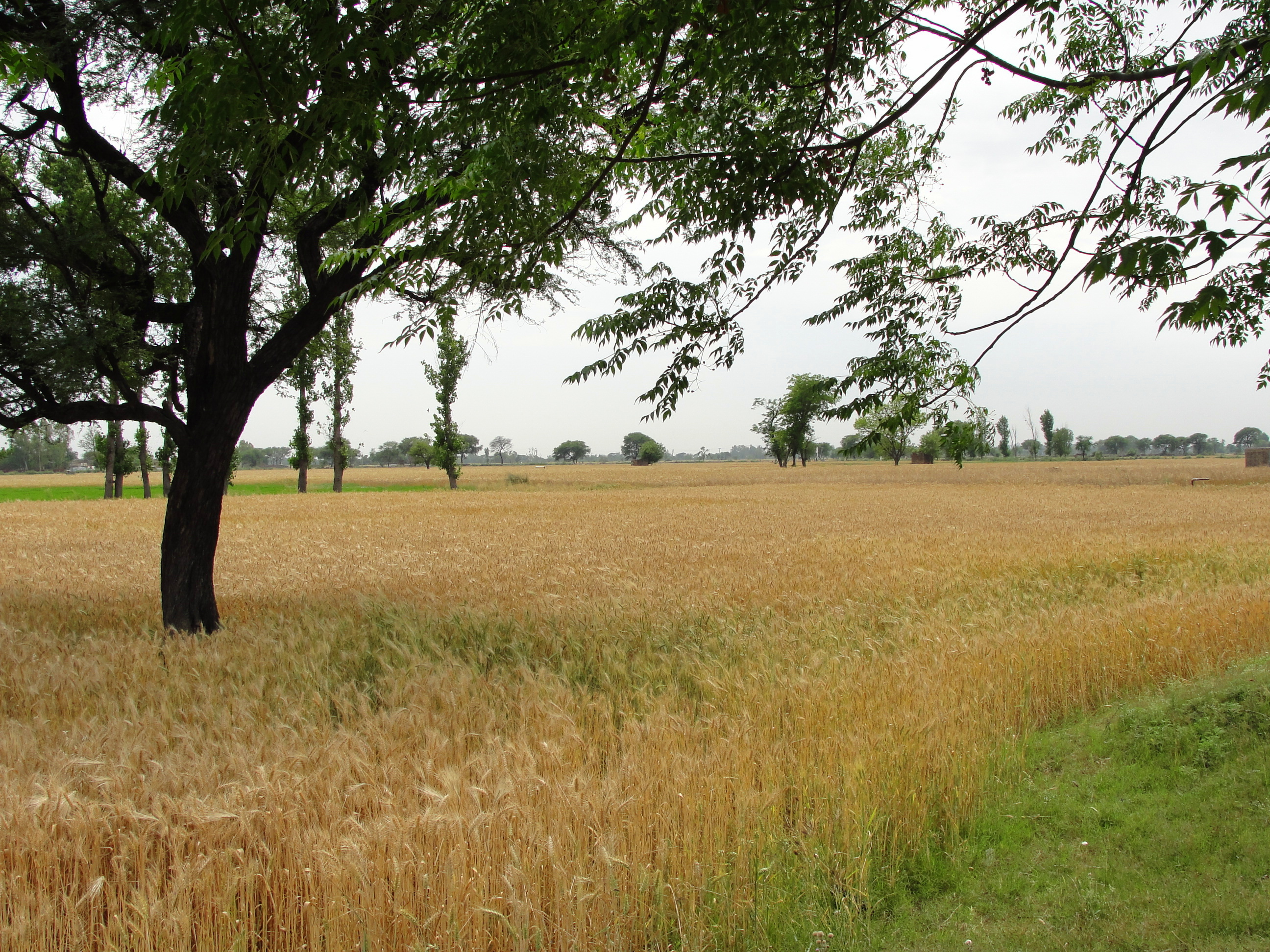
- Crop fields in Sialkot, Punjab, Pakistan

- Map of the Northwestern thorn scrub forests ecoregion

Ecology
- Realm: Indomalayan
- Biome: deserts and xeric shrublands
- Borders: List: Baluchistan xeric woodlands; Himalayan subtropical pine forests; Indus River Delta–Arabian Sea mangroves; Indus Valley Desert; Khathiar–Gir dry deciduous forests; Thar Desert; Western Himalayan broadleaf forests; Upper Gangetic Plains moist deciduous forests

Geography
- Area: 486,906 km^{2} (187,995 mi^{2})
- Countries: India; Pakistan
- states of India and provinces of Pakistan: List: Gujarat; Haryana; Jammu and Kashmir; Punjab; Rajasthan (India); Baluchistan; Khyber Pakhtunkhwa; Punjab, Sind (Pakistan)

Conservation
- Conservation status: critical/endangered
- Protected: 20,150 km² (4%)

The Northwestern thorn scrub forests, presently known as Aravalli west thorn scrub forests, is a xeric shrubland ecoregion of Pakistan and Northern India, stretching along the border lowlands and hills between the two countries. Once mostly covered in tropical dry deciduous forest, most of this ecoregion has been degraded through agriculture and the extraction of timber so that it currently has a scanty covering of thorny scrub dominated by such trees as Acacia senegal, Acacia leucophloea and Prosopis cineraria. Where the soils are particularly saline, there are patches of semi-desert. A number of mammals are found in this habitat, as well as about four hundred species of bird. Some small areas are protected but the collection of firewood and the conversion of the land to subsistence farming continues.

== Location and description ==
The ecoregion encircles the Thar Desert and Indus Valley Desert ecoregions. It stretches along the border lowlands and hills between India and Pakistan and includes: the western half of Gujarat (excluding the mountain of Girnar), and extending through Rajasthan, where it is bounded on the southeast by the Aravalli Range; most of Haryana and Punjab states of India as well as the Jammu region of Jammu and Kashmir, extending to the foothills of the Himalayas; in Pakistan, most of Punjab province, extending into easternmost Northwest Frontier and Baluchistan provinces and western Sindh.

This ecoregion, together with the Thar Desert and Indus Valley Desert ecoregions, form Miklos Udvardy's "Thar Desert" Biogeographic province.

== Climate ==
The climate of the ecoregion consists of Hot semi-arid (Köppen climate classification (BSh)) and Arid (Köppen climate classification (BWh)) climates. This climate is characteristic of steppes, grasslands, and forests. The temperature includes, hot summers and cool or dry winters. Precipitation averages 500–600 mm/year with heavy rainfalls and evening thunderstorms with the possibility of cloudbursts and flash floods in the monsoon season, late July–August. This being said, it only receives enough rainfall to support scrub. It does not receive enough rainfall to feature in the humid subtropical climate.

== Flora ==
The Northwestern thorn scrub forests are thought to be tropical dry forests that have been degraded through intensive agriculture and grazing into stunted and open thorn scrub, dominated by trees such as Acacia senegal and Acacia leucophloea, as well as Prosopis cineraria, Capparis zeylanica, Ficus benghalensis, Ficus religiosa, Syzygium cumini, Albizia lebbeck, Azadirachta indica, Dalbergia sissoo and species of Salvadora, Gymnosporia, Grewia, and Gardenia. However the region also contains patches of semi-desert where the soil is particularly saline.

== Fauna ==
Despite the large scale forest clearance large mammals still remain in the ecoregion including Indian leopard and their prey such as chinkara (Gazella bennettii), nilgai (Boselaphus tragocamelus), Indian hog deer (Axis porcinus) sambar deer (Rusa unicolor) and the threatened species chousingha (Tetracerus quadricornis), and blackbuck (Antilope cervicapra). The scrubland is also home to another large cat, the caracal, which preys on mice, birds, and reptiles. There are two endemic mammals, both bats: Triaenops persicus and the small mouse-tailed bat (Rhinopoma muscatellum). Historically, the bengal tiger used to occur throughout the region, but now are restricted to tiny pockets in Rajasthan and Gujarat.

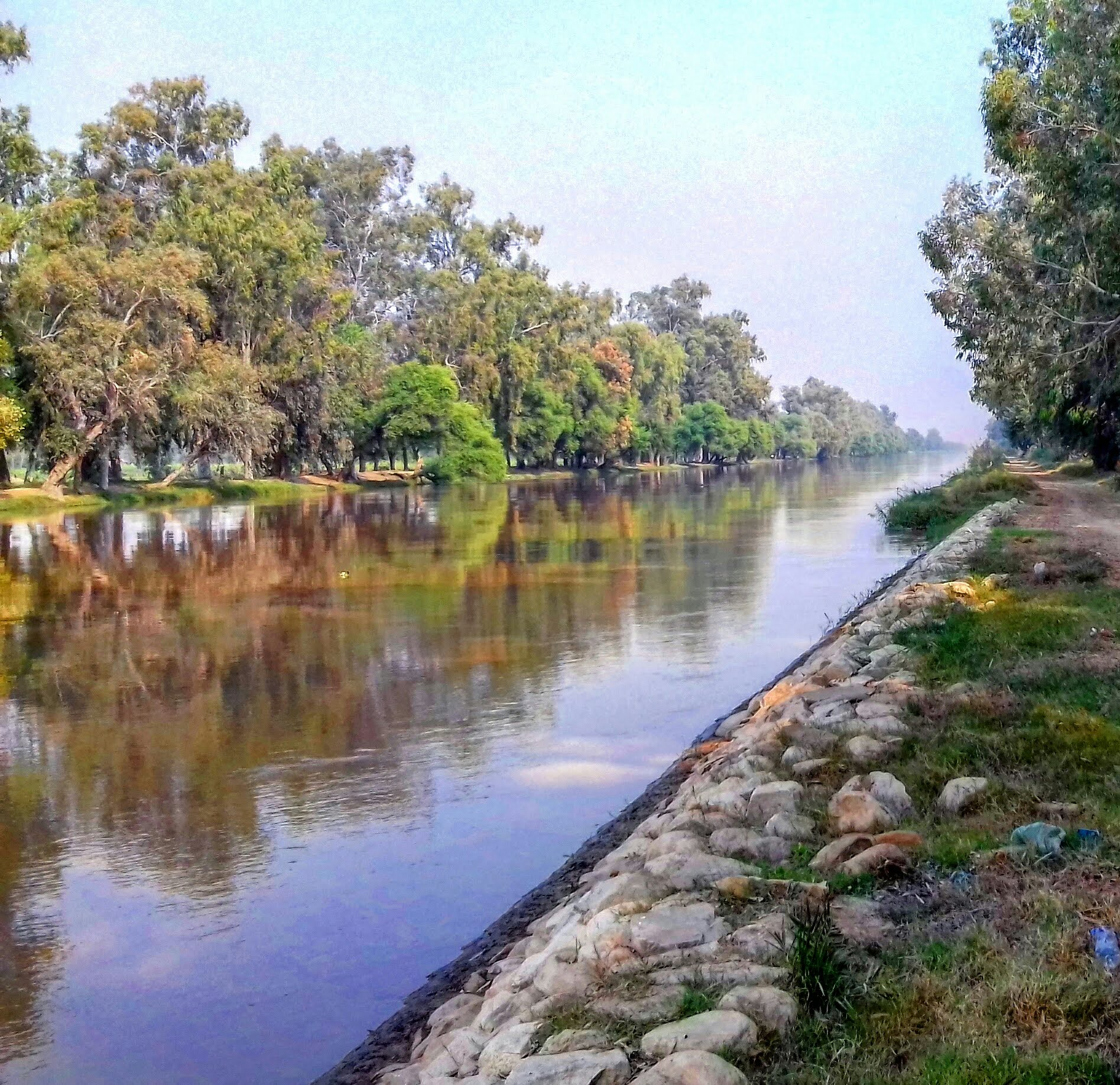
Surviving tropical dry forests in Lal Suhanra National Park.

There are more than 400 species of birds in the region including the endemic rufous-vented grass babbler (Laticilla burnesii), the near-endemic white-winged tit (Parus nuchalis) and the threatened great Indian bustard (Ardeotis nigriceps) and lesser florican (Eupodotis indica).

== Threats and preservation ==
Over 90% of the ecoregion has been converted to human use, and the remaining habitat is highly fragmented. There are many protected areas but they are very small and unconnected and even these are liable to invasion for firewood collecting and clearance for planting. However the traditions of the Bishnoi community based in this region extend protection to some wildlife, especially the blackbuck and the tree.

Some of the protected areas include the Lal Suhanra National Park, Deva Vatala National Park, Lashari wala Forest, Taunsa Barrage Wildlife Sanctuary, Tilla Reserve National Park in Pakistan, the Blackbuck National Park and Sariska Tiger Reserve in India.

== See also ==
- List of ecoregions in India
- Arid Forest Research Institute
