= Shandur National Park =

National park in Pakistan

Shandur-Hundrup National Park
- IUCN category II (national park)
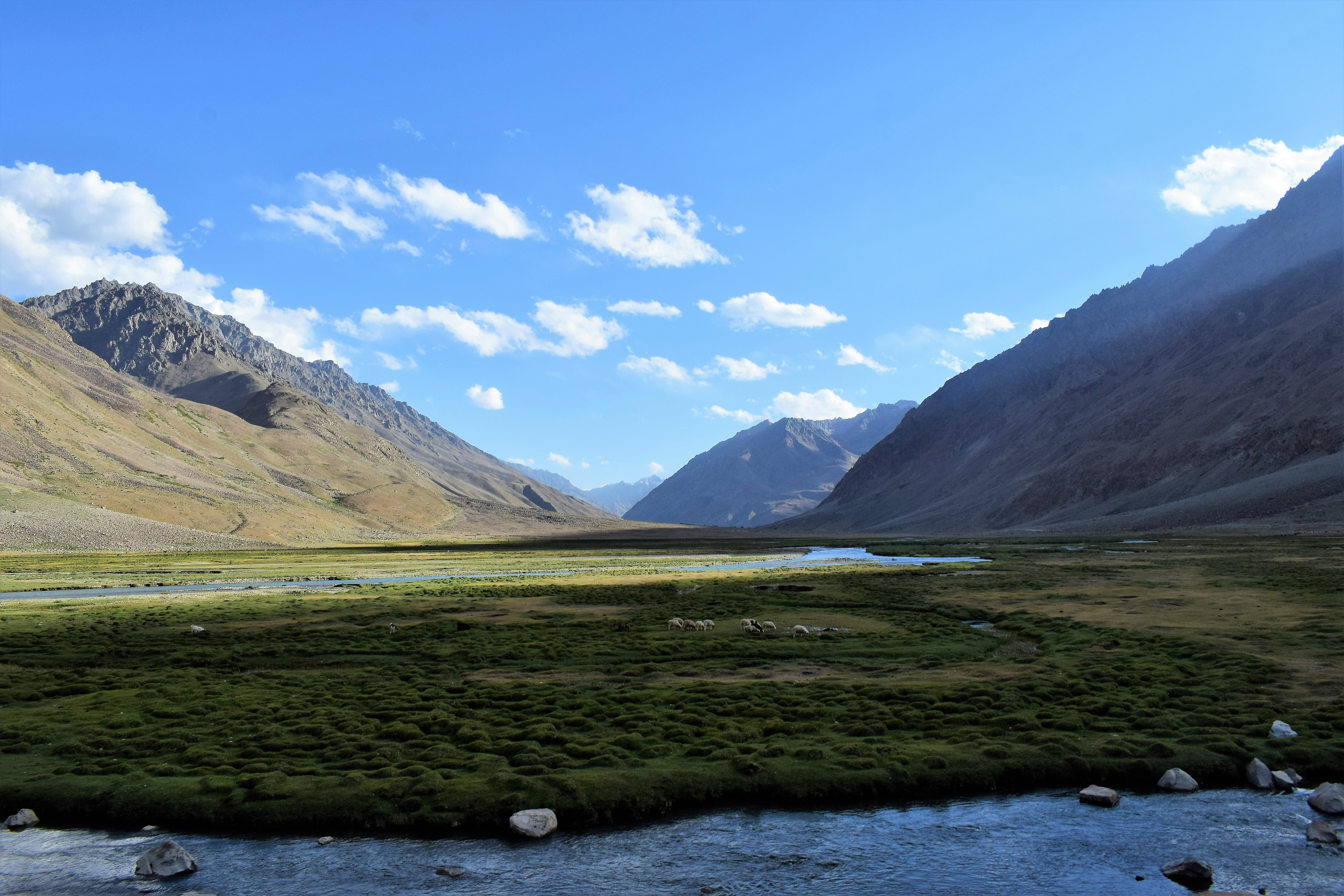
- Interactive map of Shandur-Hundrup National Park
- Location: Gupis Yasin District, Gilgit-Baltistan, Pakistan
- Coordinates: 36°05′23″N 72°33′17″E
- Area: 1,986 km^{2} (767 sq mi)
- Established: 1993

Shandur-Hundrup National Park is a protected area situated in the Pakistan administered north-western region, within the Gupis Yasin District in Gilgit-Baltistan.

== Description ==
It was declared as a national park in 1993 and has an area of 51,800 hectares or 766 km^{2}. Shandur-Hundrup covers a total area of approximately 766 square kilometers, with its highest point being the Shandur Pass, which stands at an elevation of 3,700 meters.

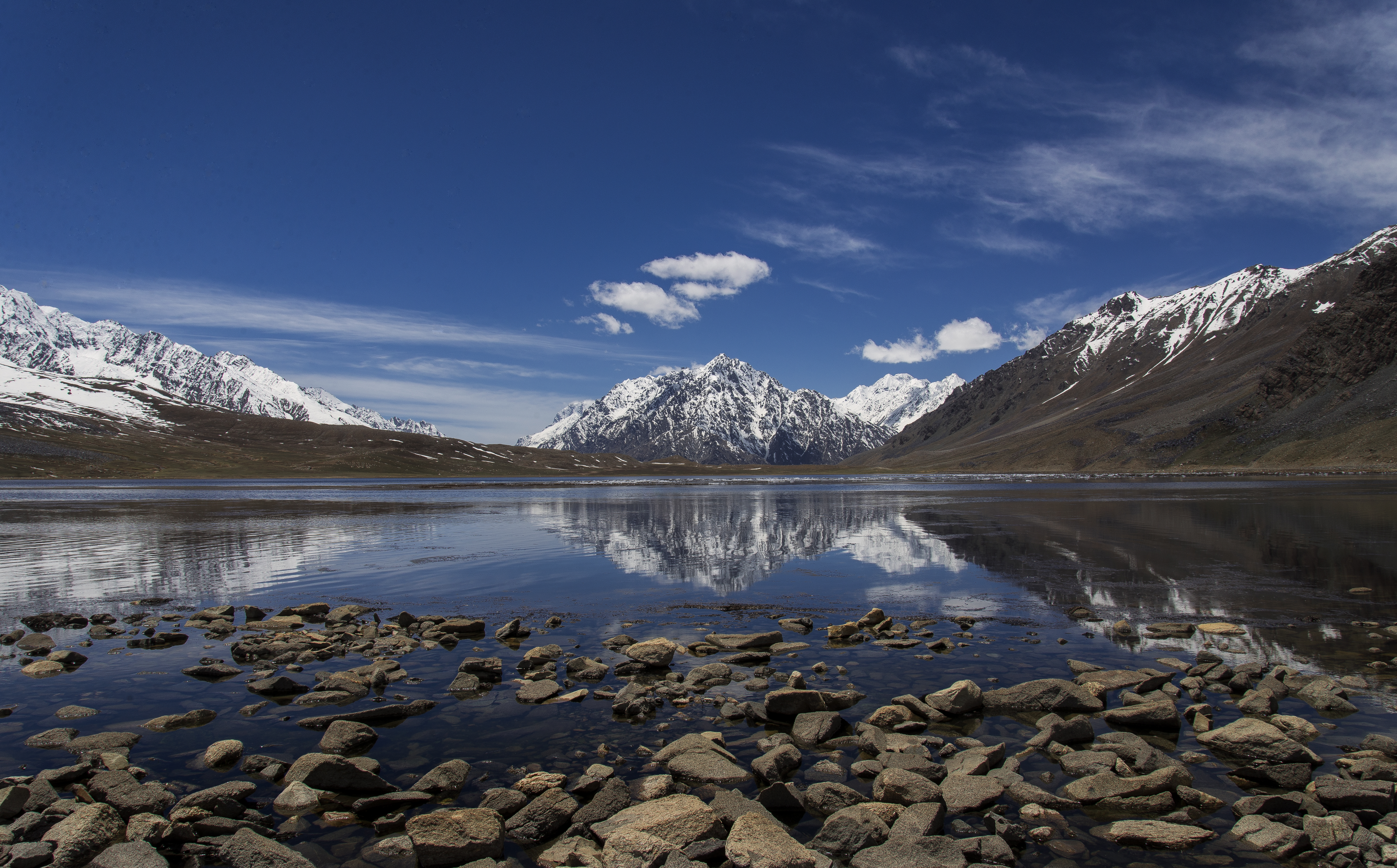
A scene of mountain reflection in waters of Shandur Lake

The Shandur Polo Ground is located at an elevation of approximately 3,700 meters above sea level. The ground is the highest polo field in the world and is host to the annual Shandur Polo Festival, which is a popular event that attracts visitors from all over the world.

== Species ==
There are 17 species found in the national park, 8 mammals and 9 birds.

=== Mammals ===
Name of animal	Scientific name	Status	Pictures
Cape hare	Lepus capensis	Least concerned	
Himalayan brown bear	Ursus arctos isabellinus	Near threatened	
Himalayan ibex	Capra sibirica	Near threatened	
Himalayan lynx	Lynx lynx isabellinus	Least concerned	
Indian wolf	Canis lupus pallipes	Endangered	
Pallas's cat	Otocolobus manul	Least concerned	
Snow Leopard	Panthera uncia	Vulnerable	
Stone marten	Martes foina	Least concerned	

=== Birds ===
Name of bird	Scientific name	Status	Pictures
Booted Eagle	Hieraaetus pennatus	Least concerned	
Chukar partridge	Alectoris chukar	Least concerned	
Common kestrel	Falco tinnunculus	Least concerned	
Eurasian sparrowhawk	Accipiter nisus	Least concerned	
Golden eagle	Aquila chrysaetos	Least concerned	
Himalayan vulture	Gyps himalayensis	Near threatened	
Eurasian hobby	Falco subbuteo	Least concerned	
Peregrine falcon	Falco peregrinus	Least concerned	
Himalayan snowcock	Tetraogallus tibetanus	Least concerned	

== See also ==
- List of national parks in Pakistan
