= Himalaya National Park =

High-altitude national park in Astore District, Gilgit–Baltistan, Pakistan

- IUCN category II (national park)
- Location within Pakistan
- Location: Astore District, Gilgit–Baltistan, Pakistan
- Nearest city: Astore
- Coordinates: 34°47′24″N 75°4′48″E
- Area: 2,263 km^{2} (874 sq mi)
- Established: 2021
- Governing body: Forest, Wildlife and Environment Department, Gilgit-Baltistan

Himalaya National Park is a protected area located in Astore District of Gilgit–Baltistan (GB), Pakistan. It was announced as part of the federal Protected Areas Initiative in December 2020 and subsequently notified by the Government of Gilgit–Baltistan in 2021. Covering approximately 2,263 square kilometres (226,300 ha), the park was established to conserve high-mountain ecosystems and threatened species such as the Himalayan brown bear (Ursus arctos isabellinus), musk deer (Moschus spp.), markhor (Capra falconeri), Himalayan ibex (Capra sibirica), and blue sheep (Pseudois nayaur).

== History ==
On 2 December 2020, the Government of Pakistan announced the creation of two new national parks in Gilgit–Baltistan: Himalaya National Park and Nanga Parbat National Park - as part of the Protected Areas Initiative launched to expand Pakistan’s network of protected areas. Combined, the two parks protect over 3,600 square kilometres (360,000 ha) of terrain, accounting for roughly 5% of Gilgit–Baltistan's total land area.

The Government of Gilgit–Baltistan formally notified the establishment of Himalaya National Park in 2021 through its Forest, Wildlife and Environment Department.

== Geography ==
The park is located in the upper Astore Valley near settlements such as Domail, Minimarg, and Rama, extending northwards toward the Deosai Plateau and eastwards toward the western Himalayan range. Its terrain comprises steep valleys, glaciers, alpine meadows, and coniferous forests lying between elevations of about 2,800 kilometres (9,200,000 ft) and 5,800 kilometres (19,000,000 ft) above sea level.

Rivers and streams originating within the park contribute to the Astore River basin, a tributary of the Indus River.

== Biodiversity ==
The ecosystem of Himalaya National Park spans sub-alpine conifer forests, alpine scrub, and high meadows supporting a range of Himalayan flora and fauna. The area provides critical habitat for the snow leopard, Himalayan brown bear, Himalayan ibex, markhor, and blue sheep, along with small carnivores such as the red fox (Vulpes vulpes montana) and stone marten (Martes foina).

Avifauna recorded in the surrounding region includes the Himalayan monal (Lophophorus impejanus), koklass pheasant (Pucrasia macrolopha), Himalayan griffon (Gyps himalayensis), and golden eagle (Aquila chrysaetos).

== Administration ==
The park is administered by the Forest, Wildlife & Environment Department of Gilgit–Baltistan, under its Parks and Wildlife Circle. The department is responsible for wildlife management, law enforcement, and ecological monitoring. Himalaya National Park is part of Gilgit–Baltistan's provincial plan to expand its protected area coverage and enhance conservation-linked tourism.

== Significance ==
Himalaya National Park represents one of the most extensive contiguous high-altitude protected landscapes in northern Pakistan. Its creation marked a major step in Pakistan's national biodiversity conservation framework by connecting existing reserves such as Deosai National Park, Khunjerab National Park, and Central Karakoram National Park. The park's rugged terrain, glacier systems, and alpine grasslands form a vital habitat corridor for endangered Himalayan species.

== See also ==
- Nanga Parbat National Park
- Deosai National Park
- Khunjerab National Park
- Protected Areas Initiative (Pakistan)
- National parks of Pakistan
