= Pir Lasura National Park =

National park in Azad Jammu and Kashmir

- PLNP
- IUCN category II (national park)
- Interactive map of Pir Lasura National Park
- Location: Kotli District, Azad Jammu and Kashmir, Pakistan
- Nearest city: Kotli
- Coordinates: 33.28°N 74.06°E
- Area: 15.8 km^{2} (6.1 sq mi)
- Elevation: 1,000–2,000 m
- Established: 2005
- Governing body: Azad Jammu & Kashmir Forests, Wildlife and Fisheries Department

Pir Lasura National Park (PLNP) is a protected area of subtropical pine and scrub forest in Kotli District of Azad Kashmir, Pakistan. The park lies near the Line of Control in Nakyal Tehsil, at elevations from about 1,000 metres (3,300 ft) to 2,000 metres (6,600 ft)

== History and legal status ==
Peer-reviewed and government-linked sources consistently describe the site as notified in 2005 as a national park. A biodiversity assessment notes the gazette notification covered forest compartments totalling 2,916 acres (11.80 km^{2}); subsequent ecological studies, however, treat the park extent as 1,580 hectares (15.8 km^{2}), reflecting either later boundary understanding or differences between legal and ecological study areas.

== Geography ==
PLNP occupies the Pir Lasura range east of Kotli (ca. 30 km by road), in Nakyal Tehsil. Studies place the park between 33°25.92′–33°29.31′ N and 74°05.64′–74°03.02′ E, with mean annual rainfall around 1,500 mm and relief from 1,000 metres (3,300 ft) to 2,000 metres (6,600 ft) above sea level. Terrain includes ridgelines and valleys with rocky outcrops; access tracks and foot trails link villages such as Sarda, Chitibakri and Kothian used by researchers for standardised transects.

== Ecology ==
Vegetation comprises subtropical chir pine (Pinus roxburghii) forest intergrading with dry subtropical broad-leaved scrub; a baseline survey reported 159 vascular plant species from 83 families across trees, shrubs, herbs, grasses and epiphytes.

Faunal records compiled from peer-reviewed studies include leopard (Panthera pardus), barking deer (Muntiacus spp.), Indian pangolin (Manis crassicaudata), small carnivores and bats; herpetofauna surveys document multiple reptile species across slope and vegetation classes.

Avifaunal work highlights the park's importance for vultures, including White-rumped Vulture (Gyps bengalensis), Himalayan Griffon (G. himalayensis) and Egyptian Vulture (Neophron percnopterus), with mapped roosts on pines, pylons, cliffs and rocks near settlements and rivers.

== Human–wildlife interactions ==
Questionnaire-based work in 2014–2015 documented livestock depredations by common leopards, with incidents concentrated in late spring–summer and linked to husbandry practices (unguarded or large herds). Authors recommend husbandry adjustments and compensation mechanisms to reduce conflict.

== Research and monitoring ==
Multiple standardized field transects and point counts have been reported from localities such as Sarda, Chitibakri, Shakyali, Kothian, Phagwarmorah and Panagali, providing reproducible coordinates and elevations for future surveys. The park frequently features as a case study for Indian pangolin conservation and vulture population mapping in the western Himalaya–Pothwar transitional zone.

== Area ==
Published ecological studies treat PLNP as 1,580 hectares (15.8 km^{2}), while a government-linked biodiversity report cites the original gazette total of 2,916 acres (11.80 km^{2}) for specified forest compartments in Kotli District. Because later peer-reviewed work consistently uses 1,580 hectares (15.8 km^{2}) and maps a wider set of transects, editors sometimes note the difference pending access to the full AJK notification series.

== See also ==
- National parks of Pakistan
- Protected areas of Pakistan
- Machiara National Park
- Poonch River Mahaseer National Park
