= Qurumbar National Park =

National park in Gilgit-Baltistan, Pakistan

Qurumbar National Park is a national park located in the Ghizer District in Gilgit-Baltistan, Pakistan. Established in 2011, it covers an area of 73,800 ha (738 km^{2}) and encompasses a variety of terrain, such as Alpine steppe and alpine meadows. It is located at 36°45’N, 74°45’E.

== Geography ==
The national park encompass the Qurumbar Valley at the extreme north-western reaches of the territory, including Karambar Lake, the second highest lake in Pakistan. Other landmarks include Broghil Pass, Chillinji Pass and Qurumbar Glacier. Broghil Valley National Park is adjacent to it in the Chitral District. It borders Hindu Kush and Himalayas.

== Flora and fauna ==
Qurumbar National Park hosts a variety of flora and fauna. Notable animal species include Himalayan wolf, Himalayan ibex, Himalayan lynx, Himalayan brown bear, Snow Leopard, Pallas's cat, Marco Polo sheep and Cape hare. Birds species include Booted eagle, Eurasian sparrowhawk, Golden eagle, Himalayan griffon vulture, Bearded vulture, Common kestrel, Peregrine falcon, Chukar partridge, Snowcock and Eurasian hobby. Fauna include Pinus wallichiana, Birch, Willow, Artemisia absinthium, Ephedra, Wild rose, and Potentilla indica.
