= Tilla Reserve National Park =

Protected area in the Salt Range, Punjab, Pakistan

- IUCN category II (national park)
- Interactive map of Tilla Reserve National Park
- Location: Jhelum District, Punjab, Pakistan
- Nearest city: Pind Dadan Khan
- Coordinates: 32.75°N 73.16°E
- Area: 40.6 km^{2} (15.7 sq mi)
- Established: 2021
- Governing body: Punjab Wildlife & Parks Department

Tilla Reserve National Park is a protected area located in the Salt Range near Pind Dadan Khan in Jhelum District, Punjab Province, Pakistan. It was declared a national park in 2021 under the Protected Areas Initiative launched by the Government of Pakistan. The park covers the historic Tilla Jogian ridge and adjoining forest reserves, preserving one of the oldest forest ecosystems in the Salt Range.

== Geography ==
The park lies in the eastern Salt Range near the town of Pind Dadan Khan, bounded by the Jhelum River to the east and Khewra Gorge to the west. The landscape is characterized by steep ridges, dry subtropical forests, and rock formations dating to the Precambrian era. Elevations range from about 570 m in the foothills to over 975 m at Tilla Jogian, the highest point of the Salt Range.

The total area of the park is 10,030 acres (≈40.6 km²), as specified in the Punjab Gazette notification issued in June 2021.

== Biodiversity ==
Tilla Reserve National Park is part of the Pabbi Hills–Salt Range dry subtropical forest belt. The dominant vegetation includes Acacia modesta (phulai), Olea ferruginea (wild olive), Dodonaea viscosa (sanatha), Ziziphus nummularia, and grasses adapted to arid, rocky soils. The park provides refuge for wildlife characteristic of the northern arid zone, including the Indian pangolin (Manis crassicaudata), Asiatic jackal (Canis aureus indicus), Indian crested porcupine (Hystrix indica), Indian hare (Lepus nigricollis), wild boar (Sus scrofa), and several small carnivores and reptiles.

Bird species recorded in the area include the grey francolin (Francolinus pondicerianus), black partridge (Melanoperdix niger), blue rock pigeon (Columba livia), and migratory raptors during the winter months. The surrounding Salt Range cliffs also support colonies of bats and nesting raptors.

== Cultural significance ==
The park encompasses the ancient hilltop monastery complex of Tilla Jogian, a centuries-old pilgrimage site associated with the Nath tradition of Hindu ascetics. Historical records note that Guru Nanak visited the site during his travels, and the ruins of monasteries and ponds remain visible across the ridge. The hill’s inclusion within the national park ensures the conservation of both its natural and cultural heritage.

== Establishment and management ==
The Government of Punjab notified Tilla Reserve National Park under the Punjab Wildlife (Protection, Preservation, Conservation and Management) Act, 1974 via Notification No. 77 of 2021 issued on 10 June 2021. The park is administered by the Punjab Wildlife & Parks Department, which manages its conservation, anti-poaching patrols, and community outreach programs in collaboration with the IUCN and local forest divisions.

== Significance ==
Tilla Reserve National Park protects a unique remnant of the Salt Range’s dry forest ecosystem, a habitat increasingly threatened by overgrazing and fuelwood extraction. Its designation contributes to Pakistan’s targets under the Billion Tree Tsunami programme and the expansion of protected areas under the Protected Areas Initiative (Pakistan). The site’s dual natural and archaeological value makes it one of the most important conservation areas in the Salt Range.

== See also ==
- Tilla Jogian
- Kheri Murat National Park
- Pabbi and Rasul Reserve Forest
- Protected Areas Initiative (Pakistan)
- National parks of Pakistan
