= Tolipir National Park =

Protected area in State of Jammu & Kashmir

- IUCN category II (national park)
- Location: Bagh District, Azad Jammu and Kashmir, Pakistan

Tolipir National Park is a protected area located in the Rawlakot tehsil of Bagh District in the state of Azad Jammu and Kashmir, Pakistan. The park is home to a wide variety of flora and fauna, including a number of endangered species such as the Himalayan black bear, leopard, and snow leopard.

The park is situated in the western Himalayan mountain range, at an altitude of between 1,500 and 7,000 meters above sea level. The area is characterized by rugged terrain and steep mountain slopes, with a number of peaks rising above 6,000 meters. The climate is cold and temperate, with heavy snowfall in the winter and mild summers. The park is surrounded by the Toli Pir, Shounter, and Barmoghlasht valleys, and is fed by the Toli Pir stream, which flows through the park.

== Flora and fauna ==
=== Fauna ===
List of fauna found in the sanctuary.

#	Name	Scientific name	Picture
1	Eurasian pygmy shrew	Sorex minutus	
2	Leschenault's rousette	Rousettus leschenaultii	
3	Lesser horseshoe bat	Rhinolophus hipposideros	
4	Greater false vampire bat	Megaderma lyra	
5	Java pipistrelle	Pipistrellus javanicus	–
6	Common bent-wing bat	Miniopterus schreibersii	
7	Wall-roosting mouse-eared bat	Myotis muricola	
8	Scully's tube-nosed bat	Murina tubinaris	–
9	Northern plains gray langur	Semnopithecus entellus	
10	Rhesus macaque	Macaca mulatta	
11	Indian jackal	Canis aureus indicus	
12	Asian black bear	Ursus thibetanus	
13	Stoat	Mustela erminea	
14	Yellow-throated marten	Martes flavigula	
15	Masked palm civet	Paguma larvata	
16	Jungle cat	Felis chaus	
17	Indian leopard	Panthera pardus fusca	
18	Southern red muntjac	Muntiacus muntjak	
19	Royle's pika	Ochotona roylei	
20	Kashmir flying squirrel	Eoglaucomys fimbriatus	–
21	Red giant flying squirrel	Petaurista petaurista	
22	Indian crested porcupine	Hystrix indica	
23	House mouse	Mus musculus	
24	Kashmir field mouse	Apodemus rusiges	–
25	Turkestan rat	Rattus pyctoris	–
26	Lesser bandicoot rat	Bandicota bengalensis	
27	Short-tailed bandicoot rat	Nesokia indica	
28	Royle's mountain vole	Alticola roylei	–
