= Poonch River Mahaseer National Park =

Aquatic national park on the Poonch River in Azad Jammu and Kashmir

- IUCN category II (national park)
- Interactive map of Poonch River Mahaseer National Park
- Location: Azad Jammu and Kashmir, Pakistan (districts: Kotli, Mirpur, Poonch)
- Coordinates: 33°33′19″N 73°54′58″E
- Area: 22.5 km^{2} (8.7 sq mi)
- Established: 2010
- Governing body: Azad Jammu & Kashmir Department of Wildlife and Fisheries

Poonch River Mahaseer National Park (PRMNP) is an aquatic national park notified in 2010 along the course of the Poonch River and selected tributaries within Azad Jammu and Kashmir (AJK), Pakistan. It is widely cited as Pakistan’s first riverine/aquatic protected area, established primarily for the conservation of the golden mahseer (Tor putitora) and associated freshwater biodiversity.

== History and legal status ==
According to AJK government notifications cited in development-finance documentation, the Poonch River and its tributaries were designated as the River Poonch Mahaseer National Park by the AJK Wildlife & Fisheries Department on 15 December 2010 (Ref. SF/AV 11358-7/2010).

== Geography ==
The park follows the Poonch River corridor from reaches near the Line of Control downstream to the Mangla Reservoir, spanning parts of Kotli, Poonch and Mirpur. Tributaries (nullahs) such as Ban, Rangar, Nehl and Hajeera function as breeding and nursery grounds for cyprinids and other native fishes.

== Area ==
Global protected-area databases list PRMNP with a reported area of 22.5 km² (WDPA ID 555784205), recorded as a terrestrial and inland waters protected area in Pakistan. The legal notification covers the river and its beds, so the ecologically managed corridor discussed in assessments is functionally larger than a standard polygon footprint.

== Biodiversity ==
Basin-level assessments report at least 37 fish species in the river, including taxa of conservation or commercial importance. The system is described as a last refuge for Tor putitora in Pakistan, with active breeding in upper and middle reaches. Independent studies on the Poonch have examined water quality and metal profiles in relation to mahseer and other freshwater fauna.

== Management and use ==
The park is administered by the AJK Department of Wildlife and Fisheries. Since 2014, the department has required that hydropower schemes in the corridor demonstrate a measurable net gain for park biodiversity; the Gulpur Hydropower Project was required to implement a Biodiversity Action Plan as a precedent within PRMNP. Civil-society partners such as the Himalayan Wildlife Foundation and WWF-Pakistan have supported baseline surveys and public awareness for mahseer conservation in the park corridor.

== Significance ==
PRMNP is frequently cited as Pakistan’s first aquatic protected area and as a model for river-corridor conservation centred on an endangered flagship fish.

== See also ==
- Pir Lasura National Park
- National parks of Pakistan
- Protected areas of Pakistan
- Tor putitora
