= Machiara National Park =

National park in Pakistan

Machiara National Park is a Pakistani national park near Muzaffarabad. Established in 1996, the park is located at 34' -31’ N latitude and 73' -37’ E longitude. River Neelum, and Neelum valley are on its eastern side while the Kaghan Valley is on the west. It was notified in 1996 as a National Park.

== Geography ==
The park covers an area of 33,437 hectares. It contains evergreen broadleaved forests and deciduous broad-leaved woodlands and forms a part of Western Himalayan Broadleaf forest region; a Global 200 Ecoregion. The average rainfall is 1526.7 mm per year. The month receiving most rainfall is July, November is the one with the least rainfall.

=== Wildlife ===
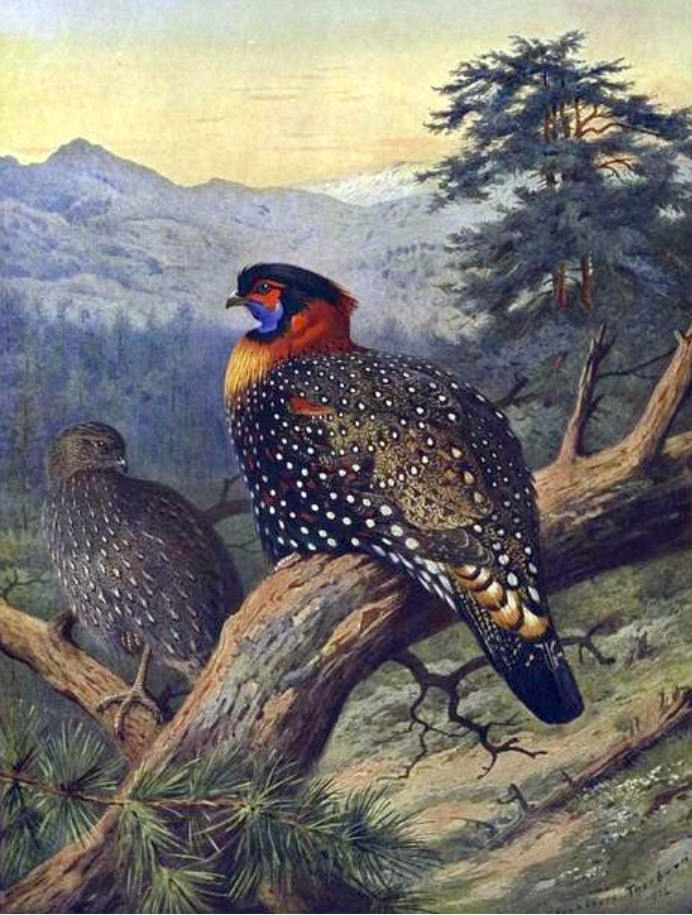
Western tragopan

Machiara National park has a high biodiversity and is home to many significant mammals, birds and plants. The species include snow leopard, Kashmir musk deer, western tragopan, cheer pheasant, lammergeier, Himalayan vulture, Himalayan quail, hoary-throated barwing, white-cheeked bushtit, white-throated bushtit, Scaly-breasted cupwing, orange bullfinch and Kashmir nuthatch. The park has been designated an Important Bird Area (IBA) by BirdLife International.
