= Nanga Parbat National Park =

National park in Pakistan

Nanga Parbat National Park is a national park located in the Diamer District and Astore District in Gilgit-Baltistan, Pakistan. Established in 2021, it covers an area of 178,561 ha (1,785.61 km^{2}) and encompasses a wide variety of terrain, including dry temperate coniferous forests and alpine meadows. It is located at 35.16375N, 74.550860E.

== Geography ==
The national park encompass several landmarks of Diamer, including Nanga Parbat, the ninth highest peak in the world, Rupal Peak, Mazeno Ridge, Fairy Meadows, Laila Peak, Shaigiri Peak, and Rama Lake.

== Flora and fauna ==
Nanga Parbat National Park hosts a variety of flora and fauna. Notable animal species includeHimalayan brown bear, Kashmir musk deer, Markhor, Ladakh urial, Himalayan ibex, Himalayan wolf, and Himalayan marmot. Birds species include Monal pheasant, magpie, and Himalayan Griffon vulture. Flora includes spruce, birch, blue pine, juniperus, fir, willow and sea buckthorn.
