= Manglot National Park =

National Park

Coordinates: 36°10′N 73°23′E

- منګلوټ ملي پارک
- Interactive map of Manglot National Park
- Location: Nizampur, Nowshera, Khyber Pakhtunkhwa, Pakistan
- Area: 1,756 acres (7.11 km^{2})
- Established: 1990; 36 years ago

Manglot National Park or Manglot Wildlife Park is national park established in 1990 in Khyber Pakhtunkhwa, Pakistan; the park is provide a natural sanctuary for wildlife. The area of the park is spread over on 711 hectares (1,756 acres) including hilltops and plain area near the Indus River in Nizampur, Nowshera.

== Flora ==
The flora of the Manglot Wildlife Park include scrub forest primarily consisting of the olive trees. Acacia modesta, zizyphus nummelaria, olea cuspidate, deodonia viscose and monothica boxifolia are the predominant vegetation of the park.

== Fauna ==
=== Mammals ===
The mammals includes the chinkara, hog deer, common leopard, wolf, wild boar, jackal, porcupine and hare.

=== Reptiles ===
Including different sort of snakes and wild lizards are present in the park.

=== Birds ===
Including chukar, three varieties of partridges, rock pigeon, dove and several sparrows from different species.
