= Kala Chitta National Park =

National Park

- Location: Attock District, Punjab, Pakistan
- Nearest city: Attock City
- Area: 363.77 km^{2} (140.45 sq mi)
- Established: 1983
- Governing body: Punjab Parks and Wildlife Department

Kala Chitta National Park is a national park located in the Attock District of Punjab, Pakistan.

The park is part of the Kala Chitta Range, in the Pothohar Plateau. The park covers an area of approximately 16,948 hectares.

== Climate and temperature ==
The area is combination of hills and plains. The area has a harsh temperature with minimum temperature of 17.92°C in January while maximum temperature of 41°C in June. The rainfall here is scarce with 650 mm annually.

== Fauna and flora ==
This area is dry temperate forest with vegetation and dominant species of Acacia, Dalbergia sissoo, Justicia adhatoda, Dodonaea viscosa and Olea europaea subsp. cuspidata.

The most common animals in the area is Indian leopard, chinkara, grey partridge and houbara bustard.
