= Lashari wala Forest =

Protected forest in Punjab, Pakistan

Lashari wala Forest Urdu: لاشاری والا جنگل
- Interactive map of Lashari wala Forest

Geography
- Location: Muzaffargarh District, Punjab, Pakistan
- Coordinates: 30°12′N 70°17′E
- Area: 5,000 acres (2,000 ha)

Administration
- Established: 1952
- Authority: Punjab Forest Department, Government of Punjab, Pakistan

Ecology
- Indicator plants: Dalbergia sissoo (Sheesham), Acacia nilotica (Kikar), Morus alba (White mulberry), Bombax ceiba (Simal).
- Fauna: 14 mammalian species (including hog deer, jackal, mouflon, nilgai and wild boar), 50 birds (including Indian peafowl, Gyps bengalensis and other Asiatic vultures), six reptiles, two amphibians and 27 insect species.

Lashari wala Forest (Urdu لاشاریی والا جنگل بیلا ) is forest located near Taunsa Barrage, a Ramsar site in Punjab, Pakistan. The Taunsa Ramsar site is among 19 Ramsar sites in Pakistan. Taunsa Barrage was designated a Ramsar site on 22 March 1996. The western brink of Head Taunsa Barrage stretches around 5,000-km in Kot Adu Muzaffargarh District of South Punjab, Pakistan, about 90 km from Multan and 10 km from Kot Adu.

== Flora and fauna ==
The forest includes plants indigenous to the Punjab region, such as: Dalbergia sissoo (Sheesham), Acacia nilotica (Kikar), Morus alba (White mulberry), Bombax ceiba (Simal). Additionally, 14 mammalian species can be found in the forest (including hog deer, jackal, mouflon, nilgai and wild boar)along with 50 bird species (including Indian peafowl, Gyps bengalensis and other Asiatic vultures), six reptiles, two amphibians and 27 insect species. Aquatic species include Indus Dolphin (Platanista minor), Smooth-coated Indian Otter(Lutrogale perspicillata), Marbled Teal (Marmaronetta angustirostris) and Pond Spotted Turtle (Geoclemys hamiltonii).

The wetland is also an important breeding site for the Lesser Whistling Teal (Dendrocygna javanica), RuddyCrake (Laterallus ruber) and Pheasant-tailed Jacana (Hydrophasianus chirurgus). The Bar-headed Goose (Anser indicus), Ruddy Shellduck (Tadorna ferruginea), Painted Snipe (Rostratula benghalensis) and Pallas Fishing Eagle (Haliaeetus leucoryphus) are other important species found at this wetland. Other local bird species found are Black Partridge(Francolinus francolinus), Grey Partridge (Francolinus pondicerianus), Quail (Coturnixcoturnix), Blue Bird (Sialia sialis), Jungle Pigeon, Sun Bird, Doves, House Sparrow(Passer domesticus), Warblers, Russian Sparrow, Crow (Corvus splendens), Owl, Parakeet (Psittacula krameri) and Crow pheasant (Centropus sinensis). Other largemammal species of concern are Jackal (Canis aureus), Cape Hare (Lepus capensis), Porcupine (Hystrix indica) and Wild boar (Sus scrofa).

== 2021 Fire ==
There was large fire in the Forest in March 2021 due to illegal and political control over forest and wood theft from forest by political leaders of the area Rind and Hanjra family. They burned the forest in their strife Pakistan Tehreek-e-Insaf MPA Muhammad Ashraf Khan Rind and Malik Ghulam Qasim Hanjra. The fire had burnt large tracts of the forest, spread over more than 2500 acres, killing hundreds of birds and animals.

== Tourist attraction ==
It is a popular tourist place of Muzaffargarh district and surrounding areas. People come on weekends to enjoy nature and natural habitat.

== See also ==
- Balloki Headworks
