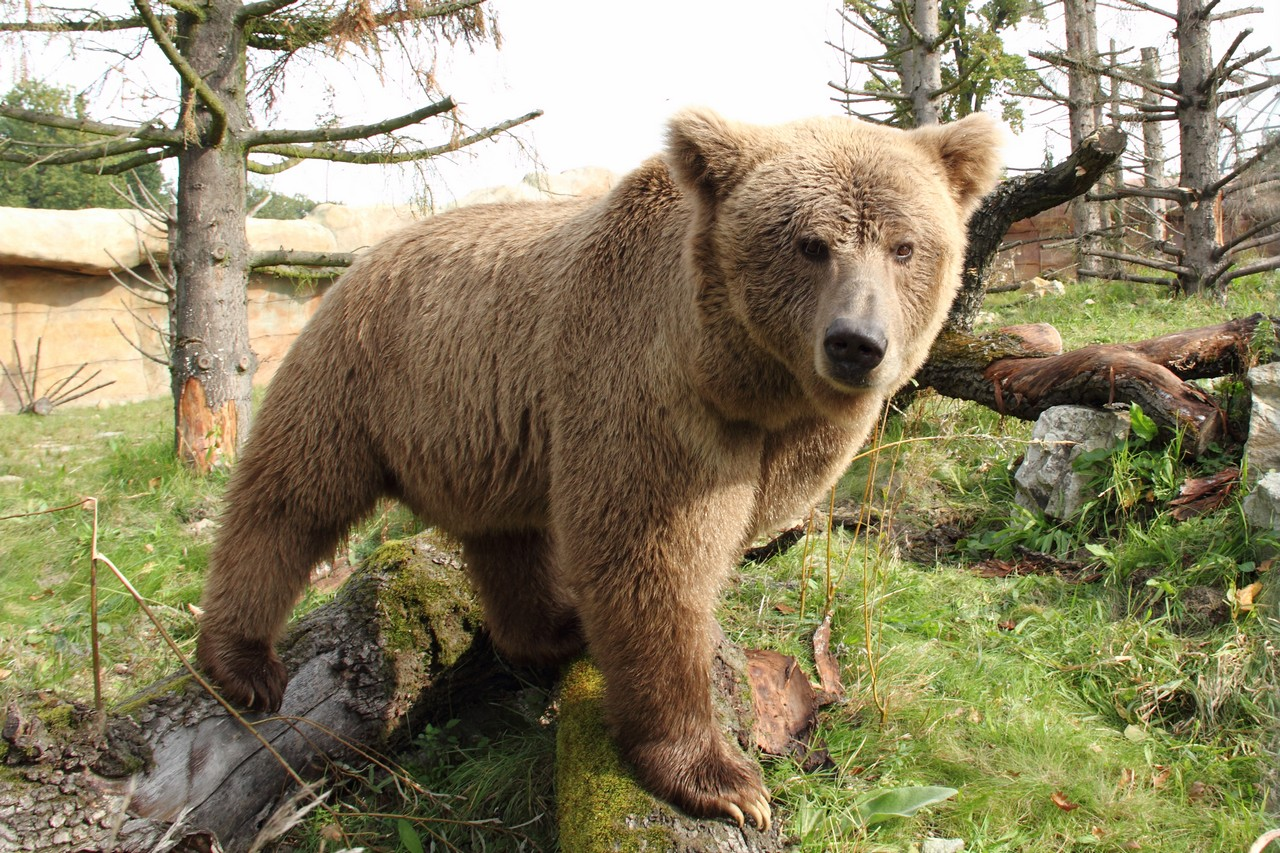

Conservation status
- CITES Appendix II

Scientific classification
- Kingdom: Animalia
- Phylum: Chordata
- Class: Mammalia
- Order: Carnivora
- Family: Ursidae
- Genus: Ursus
- Species: U. arctos
- Subspecies: U. a. isabellinus

Trinomial name
- Ursus arctos isabellinus Horsfield, 1826
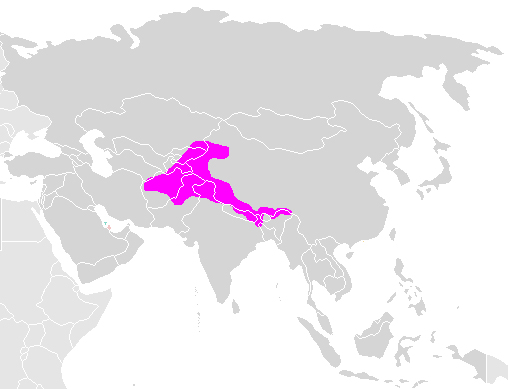
- Himalayan brown bear range

= Himalayan brown bear =

Subspecies of mammal

The Himalayan brown bear (Ursus arctos isabellinus), also known as the Himalayan red bear or isabelline bear, is a subspecies of the brown bear occurring in the western Himalayas. It is the largest mammal in the region, males reaching up to 2.2 m (7 ft 3 in) long, while females are a little smaller. It is omnivorous and hibernates in dens during the winter.

== Description ==
Himalayan brown bears exhibit sexual dimorphism. Males range from 1.5 to 2.2 m (4 ft 11 in to 7 ft 3 in) long, while females are 1.37 to 1.83 m (4 ft 6 in to 6 ft 0 in) long. They are usually sandy or reddish-brown in colour.

== Distribution and habitat ==
The Himalayan brown bear is distributed throughout the Tien-Shan mountains, Chong Alai and Alai Ranges, Pamir-Alai, western Himalayas, from the subalpine and alpine regions of Khunjerab, Deosai, Nanga Parbat, Qurumbar, Broghil and other national parks within the Gilgit-Baltistan and Chitral regions of northeastern Pakistan; to Jammu and Kashmir, Himachal Pradesh and Uttarakhand in northern India. It also occurs in the Himalayas of central Nepal.

At present, it is unknown whether the Himalayan brown bear is connected to brown bear populations in the Karakoram Mountains and on the Tibetan Plateau.

== Phylogenetics and evolution ==
The Himalayan brown bear consists of a single clade that is the sister group to all other brown bears and the polar bear. The dating of the branching event, estimated at 658,000 years ago, corresponds to the period of a Middle Pleistocene episode of glaciation on the Tibetan plateau, suggesting that during this Nyanyaxungla glaciation, the lineage that gave rise to the Himalayan brown bear became isolated in a distinct refuge, leading to its divergence.

Phylogenetic analysis has shown that the Gobi bear clusters with the Himalayan brown bear and may represent a relict population of this subspecies.

== Behaviour and ecology ==
The bears go into hibernation around October and emerge during April and May. Hibernation usually occurs in a den or cave made by the bear.

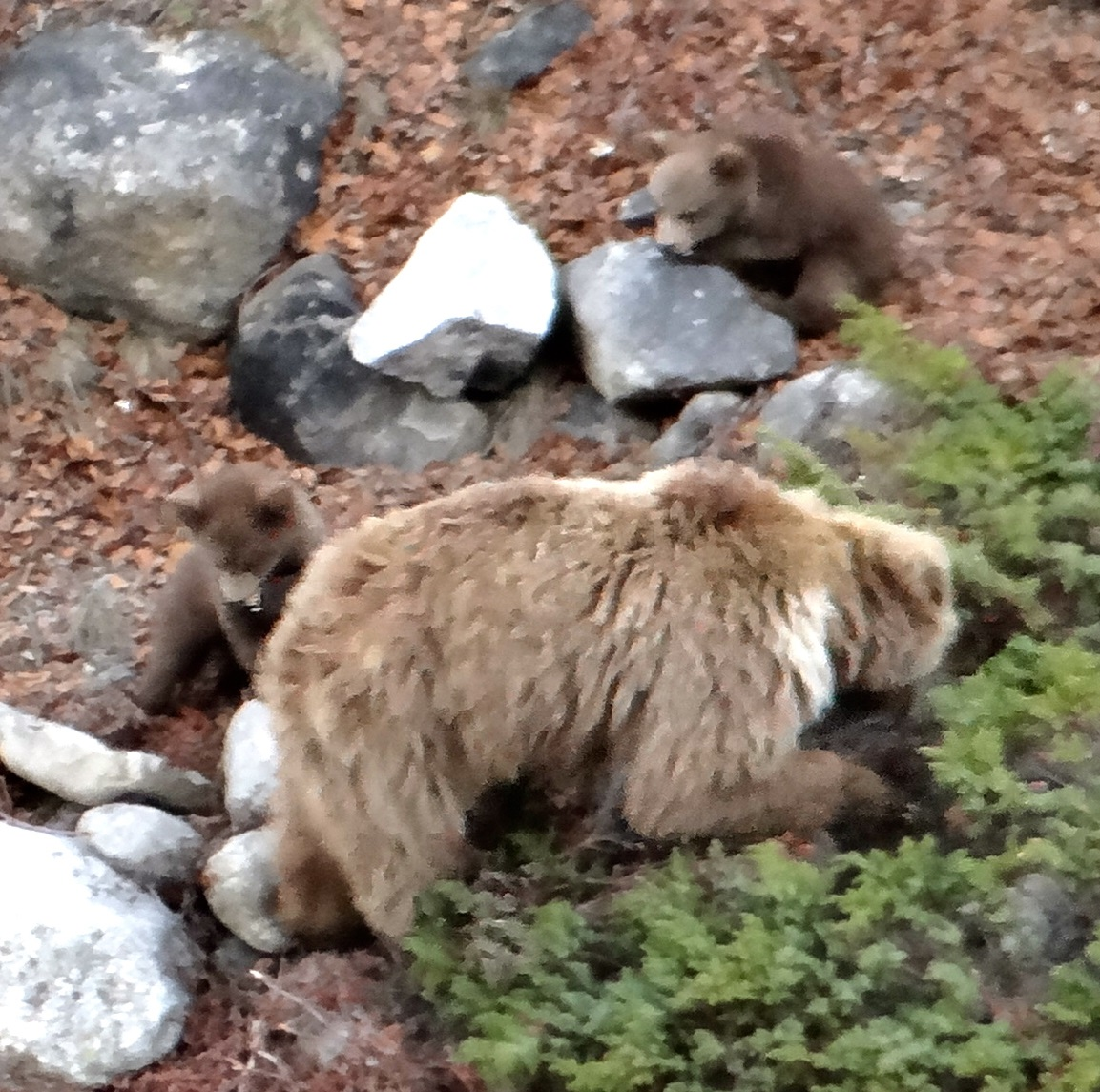
Adult with cubs in Uttarakhand, India

=== Feeding ===
Himalayan brown bears are omnivores and will eat grasses, roots and other plants as well as insects and small mammals; they also like fruits and berries. They will also prey on large mammals, including sheep and goats. Adults will eat before sunrise and later during the afternoon.

== Threats and conservation ==
The Himalayan brown bear is poached for fur and claws for ornamental purposes and internal organs for use in medicines. It is killed by shepherds to protect their livestock. In Himachal Pradesh, their home is the Kugti and Tundah wildlife sanctuaries and the tribal Chamba region. The tree bearing the state flower of Himachal, buransh, is the favourite habitat of the Himalayan brown bear. Due to the high value of the buransh tree, it is commercially cut causing further destruction to the brown bear's habitat.

=== Population ===
The Himalayan brown bear is classified as critically endangered in Pakistan. The population of Himalayan brown bears in northern Pakistan was estimated to be about 150–200 individuals in 2007, in an area of about 150,000 km^{2} (58,000 sq mi). The Deosai plateau in the western Himalayan regions is currently home to the most significant and stable Himalayan brown bear population. Despite the fact that brown bear habitat is generally declining, the population in Deosai National Park is protected in a number of ways, especially from anthropogenic pressure, which is fueling its expansion. It is threatened by overgrazing and farming, poaching, the illicit trade in bear fat and pelts, the extraction of ethno-botanical plants, the unsustainable use of natural resources, and poor tourism. In 2021, the Pakistani government declared two additional areas within the natural habitat of Himalayan brown bears, Himalaya National Park and Nanga Parbat National Park, as protected. A 2022 survey of Himalayan brown population by Government of Gilgit-Baltistan estimated 66 individuals in Deosai National Park and neighbouring valleys. Individuals were also sighted in other protected areas, notably in Khunjerab National Park, Qurumbar National Park and Broghil Valley National Park.

=== Threats from human waste ===
In the Indian Himalayan region, a rapidly growing threat to the bear population is the ingestion and dependency on human waste, primarily driven by expanding tourism and inadequate solid-waste management.

Recent ecological studies suggest that as much as 75% of the Himalayan brown bear's diet now consists of scavenged waste from human dump sites. This dietary shift is driven by the loss of natural alpine habitat and the increased accessibility of waste, which creates a dangerous overlap between human and wildlife habitats, particularly near protected areas like the Kugti Wildlife Sanctuary. Scavenging on waste poses several health risks, including:

- Reduced nutritional intake compared to their natural diet.
- Ingestion of toxic chemicals, such as BPA, which can negatively affect reproduction, neurological systems, and mortality rates.
- Physical injury from plastic ingestion, which can cause blockage, ulceration, or perforation of the digestive tract, potentially leading to starvation or death.
- Exposure to pathogens and zoonotic diseases commonly found at waste dumps.

The issue is exacerbated by challenging topography and extreme climate in remote mountain areas, which make effective waste management difficult, leading to improper disposal methods like dumping and burning. Conservation efforts, such as those by activist groups like Waste Warriors in Himachal Pradesh and Uttarakhand, focus on improving waste management infrastructure and collaborating with local communities and government bodies to mitigate this threat.

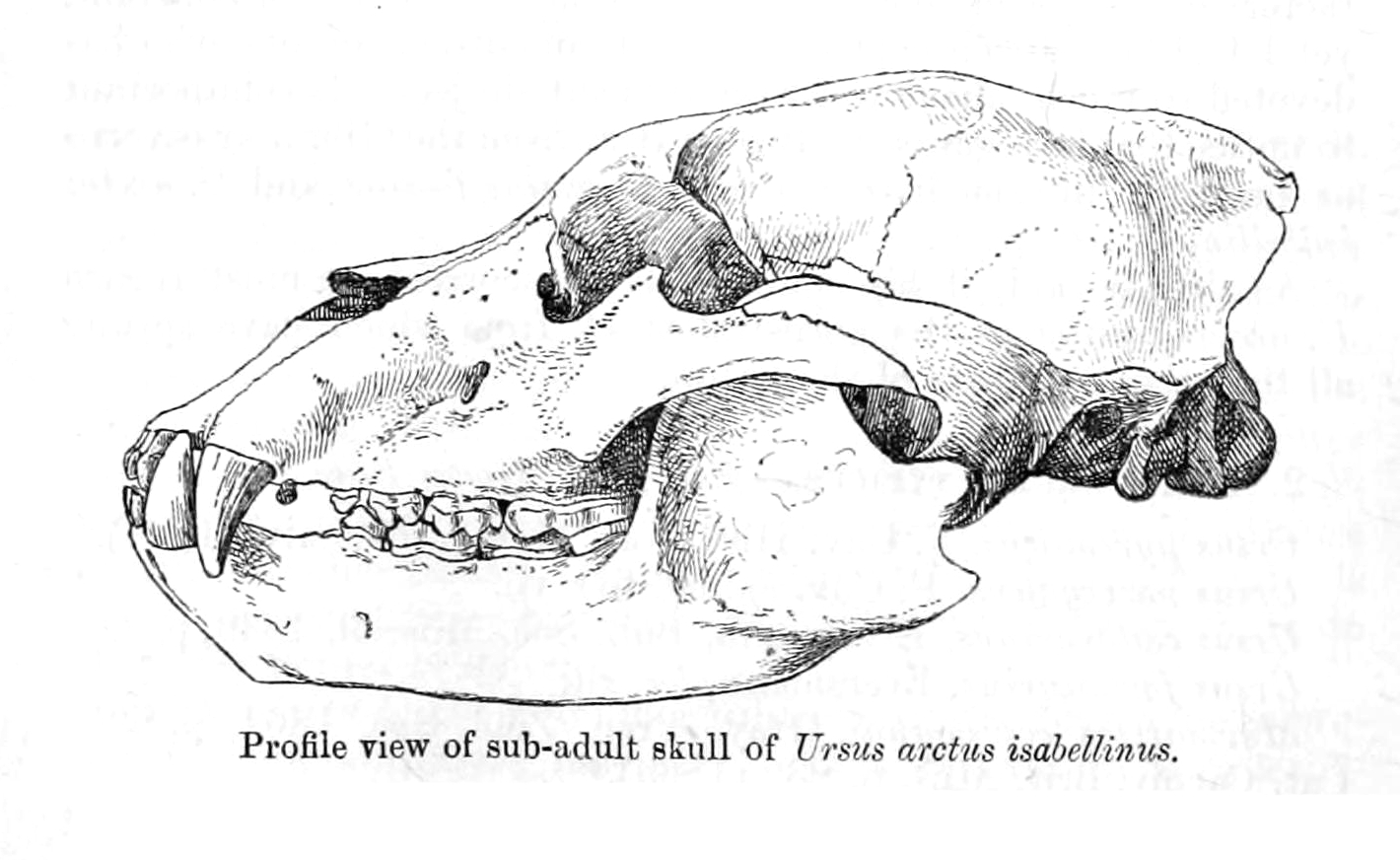
Skull

== In culture ==
A mummified animal was thought to have been a Yeti, until a 2017 analysis of its DNA showed it was a Himalayan brown bear.

"Dzu-Teh", a Nepalese term, has been associated with the legend of the Yeti, or Abominable Snowman, with which it has been sometimes confused or mistaken. During the Daily Mail's Abominable Snowman expedition of 1954, Tom Stobart encountered a "Dzu-Teh", as recounted by Ralph Izzard in his book The Abominable Snowman Adventure.

== In media ==
- The 2016 film based on Rudyard Kipling's The Jungle Book portrays Baloo as a Himalayan brown bear.
