= Pabbi and Rasul Reserve Forest =

National park in Pakistan

- Pabbi–Rasul National Park
- IUCN category II (national park)
- Location within Punjab, Pakistan
- Location: Tehsil Phalia, Mandi Bahauddin District; Tehsil Kharian and Tehsil Sarai Alamgir, Gujrat District, Punjab, Pakistan|Punjab, Pakistan
- Coordinates: 32.811°N 73.865°E
- Area: 147.2 km^{2} (56.8 sq mi)
- Designation: National park (Punjab Protected Areas Act, 2020)
- Established: 5 June 2023
- Governing body: Punjab Wildlife and Parks Department

Pabbi and Rasul Reserve Forest (also known as Pabbi-Rasul National Park) is a protected forest and national park located in northern Punjab, Pakistan. Covering an area of approximately 36,374 acres (147.20 km^{2}), it extends across the tehsils of Phalia in Mandi Bahauddin District and Kharian and Sarai Alamgir in Gujrat District. The reserve is managed by the Range Management Division, Chakwal, under the Punjab Wildlife & Parks Department. It was officially designated as a national park in 2023 under the Punjab Protected Areas Act, 2020.

== Geography ==
Located within the Pothohar Plateau and the Salt Range foothills, the reserve lies roughly around 32.811°N 73.865°E near the Jhelum River corridor. The terrain consists of undulating hills, scrub-covered ridges, and interspersed grasslands and wetlands that sustain a variety of ecological zones.

The park's official centroid corresponds to the Pabbi Reserve Forest, with associated blocks of the Rasul Reserve Forest forming part of the same protected landscape.

== Biodiversity ==
The reserve forest is characterized by subtropical thorn scrub vegetation dominated by species such as Acacia nilotica, Prosopis juliflora, Ziziphus nummularia, and Dodonaea viscosa. The landscape supports a rich mosaic of grasslands, scrub woodlands, and wetlands, home to numerous wildlife species. Departmental overviews note the presence of various game birds (including partridges and quails), mammals, and reptiles typical of northern Punjab’s dry tropical ecosystems.

== Conservation and management ==
The Punjab Wildlife and Parks Department identifies Pabbi and Rasul as a priority site for biodiversity conservation and sustainable forestry management. The reserve undertakes:

- Breeding programmes for endangered and locally threatened species,
- Wildlife monitoring to track populations and prevent illegal hunting, and
- Educational initiatives to raise public awareness about the region’s ecological value.

These activities are coordinated under the Range Management Division, Chakwal, which oversees enforcement, restoration, and afforestation work within the national park's boundaries.

== Legal framework ==
The park's establishment was formalised through two notifications:

- 30 September 2020: Initial declaration of Pabbi and Rasul Reserve Forests as a national park under the Punjab Protected Areas Act, 2020.
- 5 June 2023: Updated notification reaffirming the park’s protection and including GPS coordinates and a satellite map (Annex I) to delineate its boundaries.

== Visitor access ==
Pabbi and Rasul Reserve Forest is open for limited ecotourism and nature education programmes. The Wildlife Department promotes guided trails and interpretive visits for schools and community groups. Visitor access is restricted to designated routes to minimize ecological disturbance.

== See also ==
- List of national parks of Pakistan
- Protected areas of Pakistan
- Salt Range
- Mandi Bahauddin District
- Gujrat District
