= Lal Suhanra National Park =

National park in Punjab, Pakistan

Lal Suhanra National Park لال سہانرا نیشنل پارک
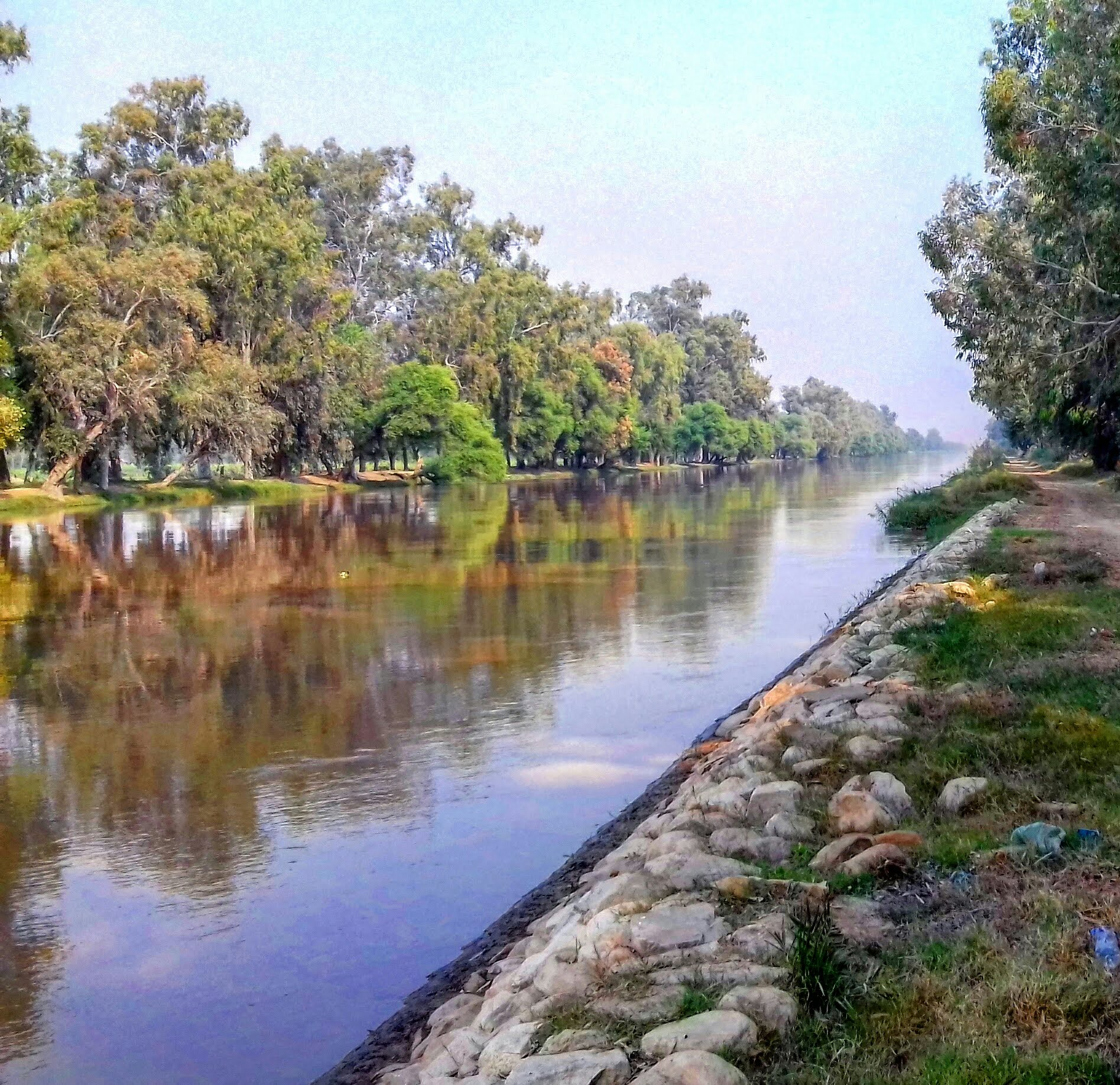

- Location within Pakistan
- Location: Punjab, Pakistan
- Nearest city: Bahawalpur, Pakistan
- Coordinates: 29°19′N 71°55′E
- Area: 657.91 km^{2} (254.02 sq mi)
- Established: 1972

Lal Suhanra National Park is a national park in Bahawalpur district of Punjab province in Pakistan. It is one of Pakistan's largest nationals parks, and is a UNESCO declared Biosphere Reserve. Its landscape includes desert, forest and wetland ecosystems.

There are archaeological remains of the ancient Indus Valley Civilisation which once flourished along the Ghaggar-Hakra River (paleo Saraswati River).

== Geography ==
Lal Suhanra National Park is situated some 35 kilometres east of Bahawalpur and presents a synthesis of forest and desert life. It occupies land on both sides of Desert Branch canal, and is spread over 51,590 hectares (127,480 acres) of which 8,488 hectares (20,974 acres) are green land (irrigated plantations), 41,167 hectares (101,726 acres) are dry land (desert), and 1,930 hectares (4,780 acres) are wet land (ponds and lakes). The park's terrain is generally flat, interspersed with sand dunes measuring up to 4 metres in height and extending to up to 1,000 hectares.

The biosphere reserve is crossed by the dried-up bed of the Ghaggar-Hakra River and comprises Patisar Lake and irrigated land. Officials said that indigenous trees like Indian rosewood and Acacia karroo will be planted over 490 hectares (1,212 acres) of barren land in the wildlife reserve.

== Wildlife ==
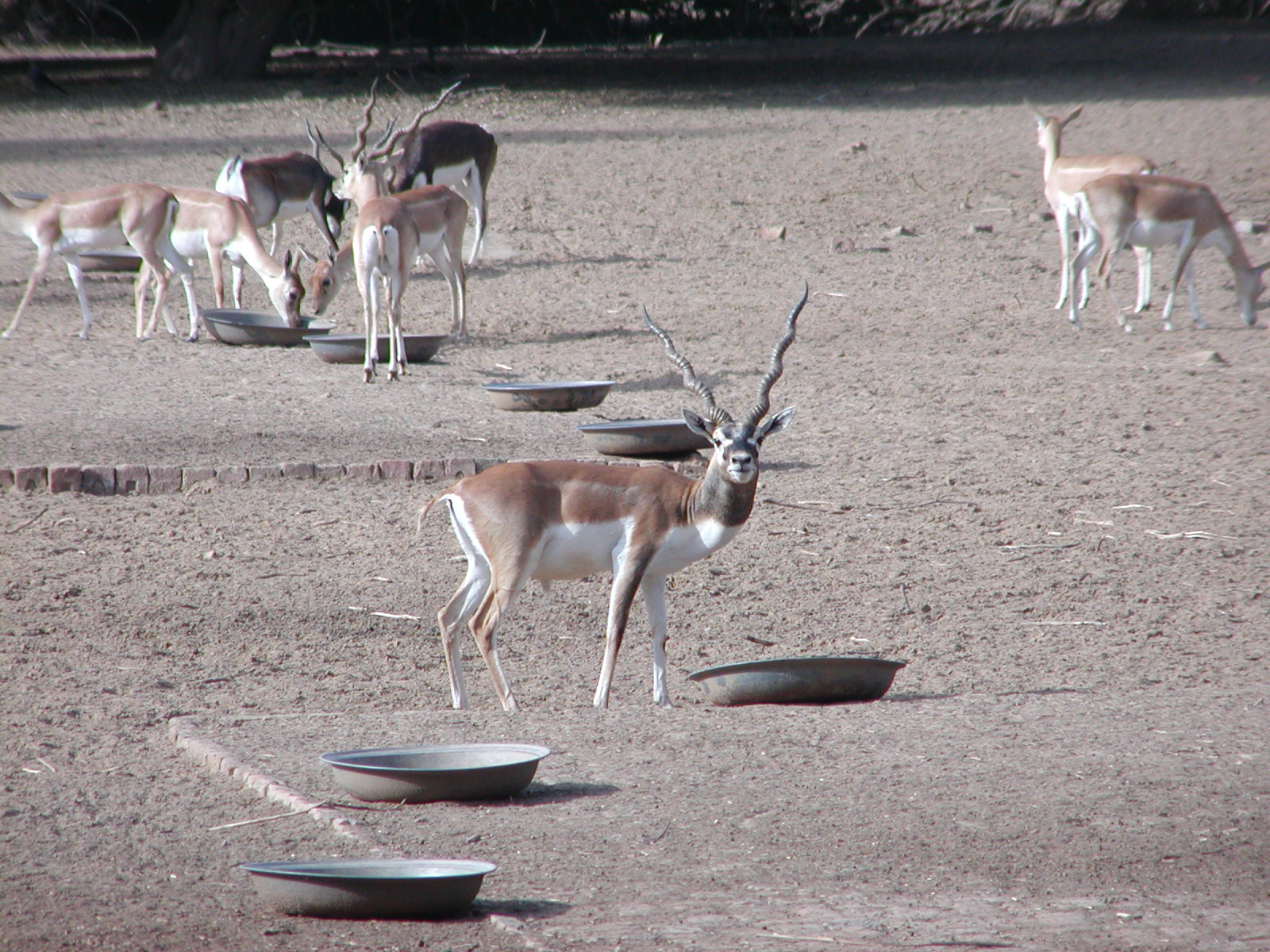
Blackbuck in Lal Suhanra National Park

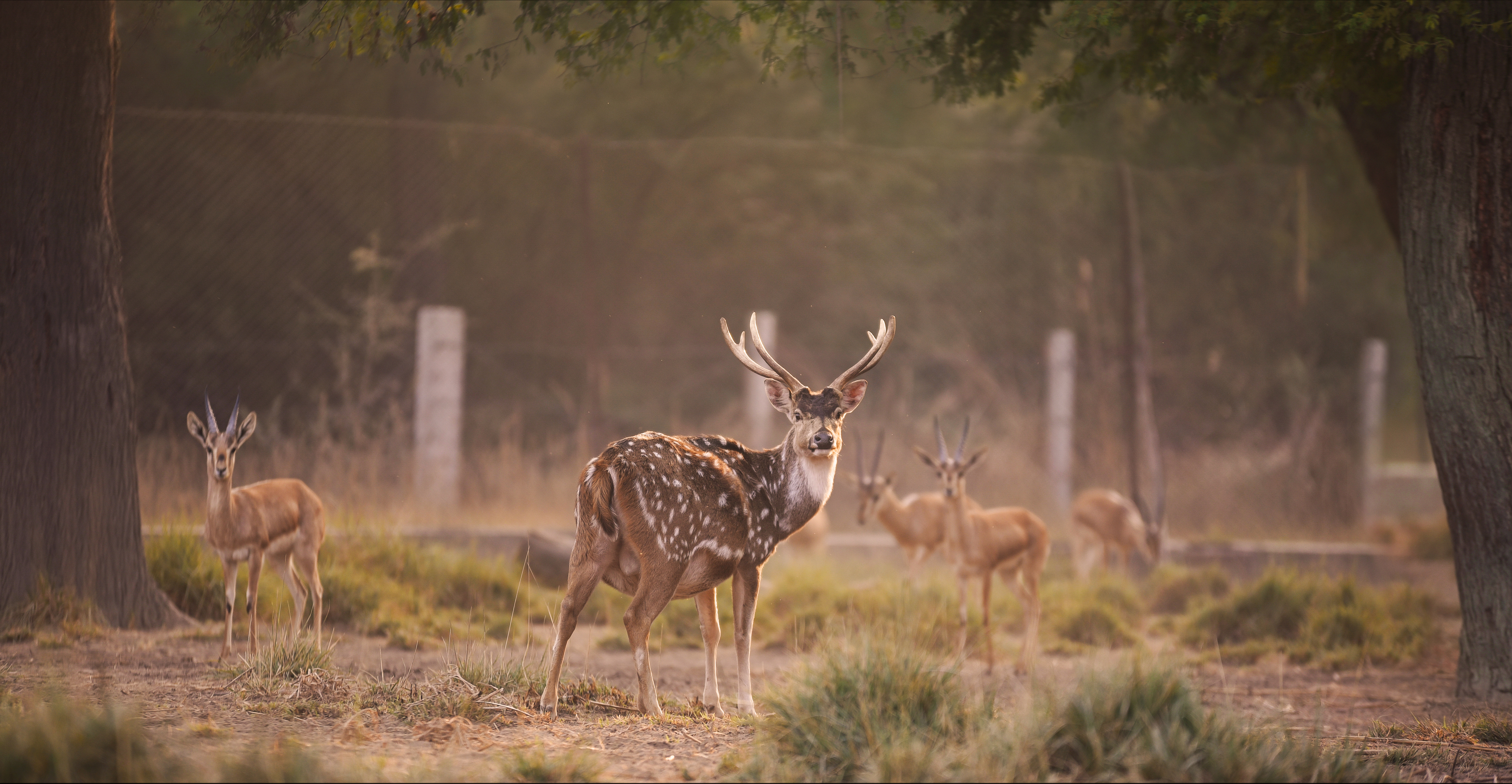
Chital and chinkara in Lal Suhanra National Park

Lal Suhanra National Park hosts native wildlife like the Indian hog deer, chinkara, blackbuck, nilgai, Indian wolf, wild boar, white-footed fox, Asiatic wildcat and Indian hare, monitor lizard, Russell's viper, Indian cobra, saw-scaled viper, wolf snake, John's sand boa, and spiny-tailed lizard; bird species include bulbul, common quail, pied cuckoo, parakeet, Sind woodpecker, great Indian bustard, black kite, Eurasian nightjar, steppe eagle, shikra, Eurasian griffon vulture and peregrine falcon. The chital has been introduced.
