= Deva Vatala National Park =

National park in Pakistan

- Interactive map of Deva Vatala National Park
- Coordinates: 32°54′09″N 74°21′45″E
- Opened: 1998

Deva-Vatala National Park is a protected area in Bhimber District, Azad Kashmir, Pakistan. It is located close to the Indian border and aligns with the district of Gujrat. The park is one of the few protected areas in Azad Kashmir to be located in a thorn forest. It is home to some of the most diverse wildlife, including the only population of Red Junglefowl, in Pakistan.

== History ==
This national park was notified in 1998 and spreads over an area of 7,000 hectares which is around 29km^{2}. It was part of India until 1971.

== Geography ==
The park is an important hotspot for biodiversity and has many lakes which attract waterfowl. It is a hilly area with a maximum height of 1,101m above sea level. It is part of the Lower Himalayan Range, and is mainly covered by tropical thorn forest.

== Flora ==
The forest is mainly tropical thorn covered by Acacia and many evergreen trees (like Mangifera indica) with diverse shrub growth. The climate is mainly sem-arid.

== Fauna ==
Deva Vatala National Park is home to many mammals, birds and reptiles.

Mammals in the park include:

- Indian leopard, "P.p.fusca"
- Golden jackal, C. a. indica
- Indian grey mongoose, H. e. edwardsii
- Small Indian civet, V. indica
- Cape hare, L. c. isabellinus
- Wild boar, S. s. scrofa
- Nilgai, B. tragocamelus
- Hog deer, A. porcinus
- Indian porcupine, H. i. blandfordi

Significant birds:

- Indian peafowl, P. cristatus
- Red junglefowl, G. gallus
- Black francolin, F. francolinus
- Grey francolin, F. pondicerianus
- Mallard, A. platyrhynchos
- Northern shoveler, S. clypeata
- Eurasian coot, F. atra

Reptiles:

- Indian python, P. molurus
- King cobra, O. hannah
- Bengal monitor, V. bengalensis
