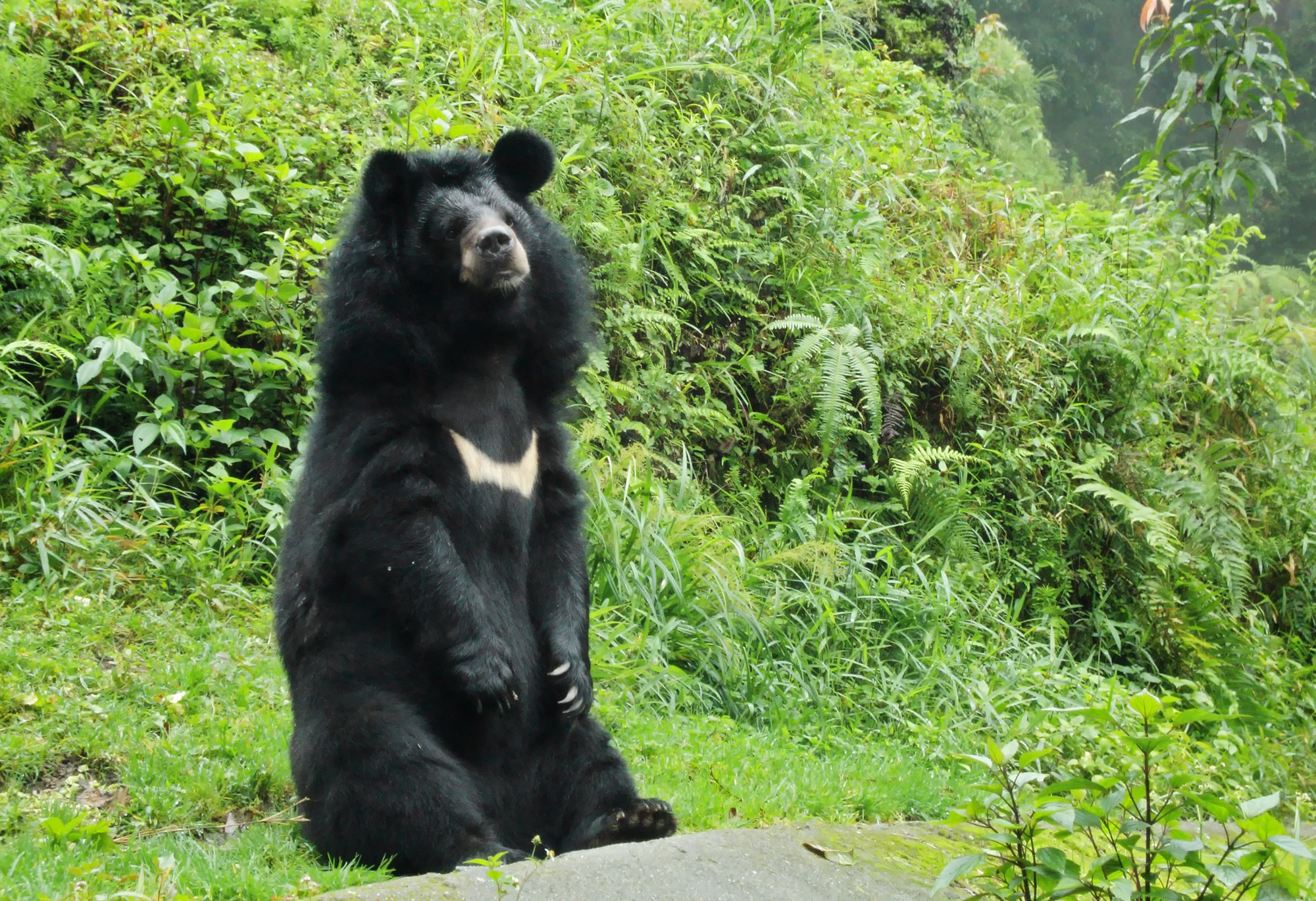

Conservation status
- Vulnerable (IUCN 3.1)

Scientific classification
- Kingdom: Animalia
- Phylum: Chordata
- Class: Mammalia
- Order: Carnivora
- Family: Ursidae
- Genus: Ursus
- Species: U. thibetanus
- Subspecies: U. t. laniger

Trinomial name
- Ursus thibetanus laniger Pocock, 1932

Synonyms
- Selenarctos thibetanus laniger Pocock, 1932

= Himalayan black bear =

Subspecies of carnivore

The Himalayan black bear (Ursus thibetanus laniger) is a subspecies of the Asian black bear. It is distinguished from U. t. thibetanus by its longer, thicker fur and smaller, whiter chest mark. The species is considered an ecological indicator and a keystone species of the environment. The species plays a vital role as a primary seed disperser in maintaining the stability of the ecosystem. On average, they measure from 140–170 cm (56–65 in) nose to tail and weigh from 91 to 120 kilograms (200 to 265 lb), though they may weigh as much as 180 kilograms (400 pounds) in the fall, when they are fattening up for hibernation.

The Himalayan black bear is typically nocturnal and elusive, although it has been observed during the day. It hibernates throughout the winter in the northwestern Himalayas, while it is usually active during the entire year in the eastern Himalayas.

== Distribution and habitat ==
The species' fossilized remains were discovered in Germany and France, but currently, it only exists in Asia, mainly confined in the Himalayas of India, Bhutan, Nepal, China, and Pakistan. During the summer, black bears can be found in warmer areas in Nepal, China, Bhutan, India and Tibet up near the timberline. The species prefers moist temperate forest mixed with deciduous broad-leaved forest, and mixture of oak, and thick dense under layer of shrubby vegetation between 1500 m to 3000 m elevation, and subtropical pine forest between 900 m to 1700 m elevation. For winter, they descend as low as 5,000 feet (1,500 metres), to more tropical forests. The species might with the distribution of U. t. thibetanus across Myanmar and northeast India to possibly Nepal in the Himalayan range.

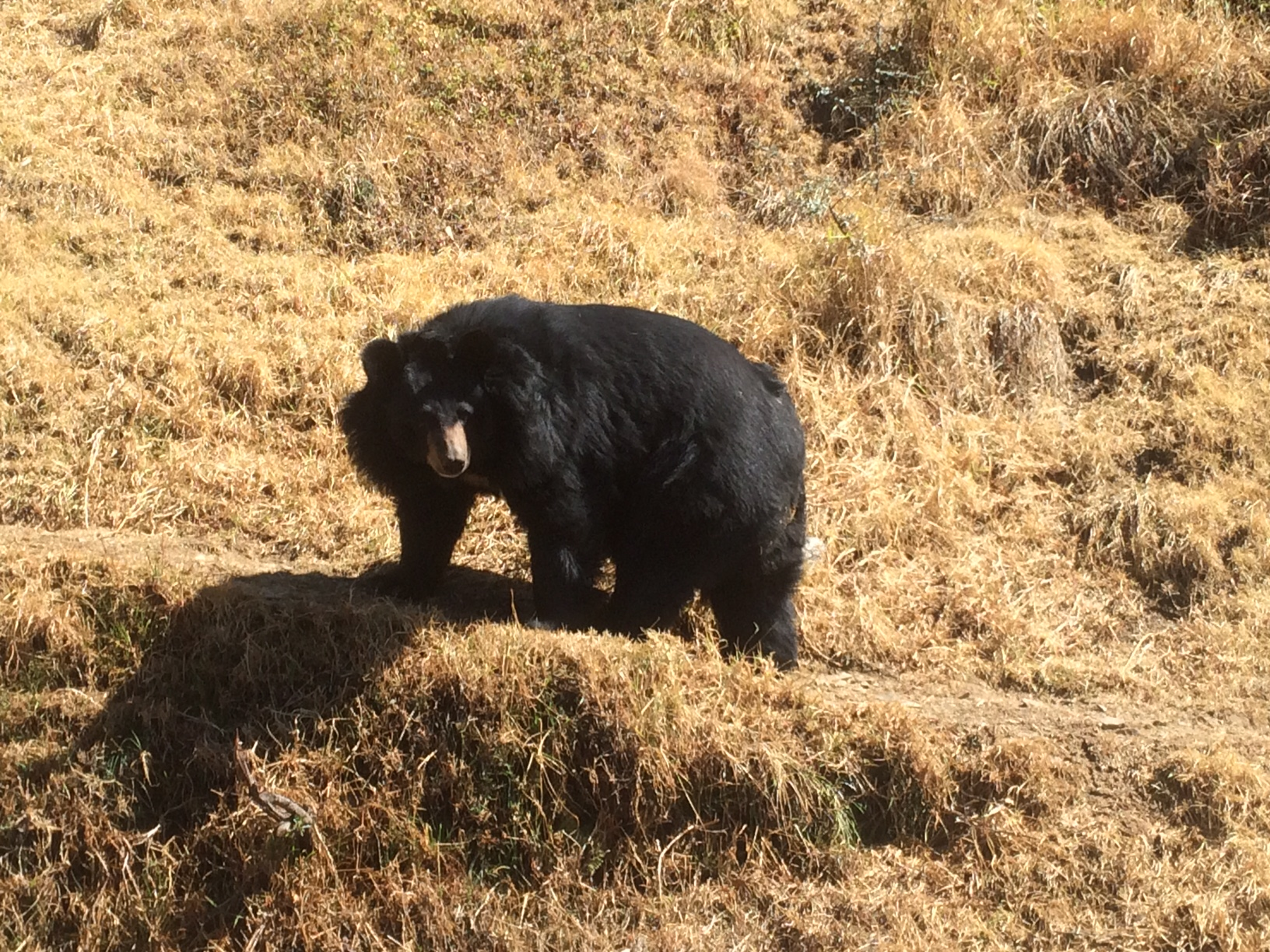
Black bear at Jim Corbett National Park, India

According to a 2018 survey, Kaghan and Siran valleys in northern Pakistan were home to more than 24 Ursus thibetanus. A 2014 survey gave an estimated range of 429–543 Himalayan black bears in northern Pakistan, notably in Chitral, Hazara, and Gilgit-Baltistan.

== Behavior and ecology ==
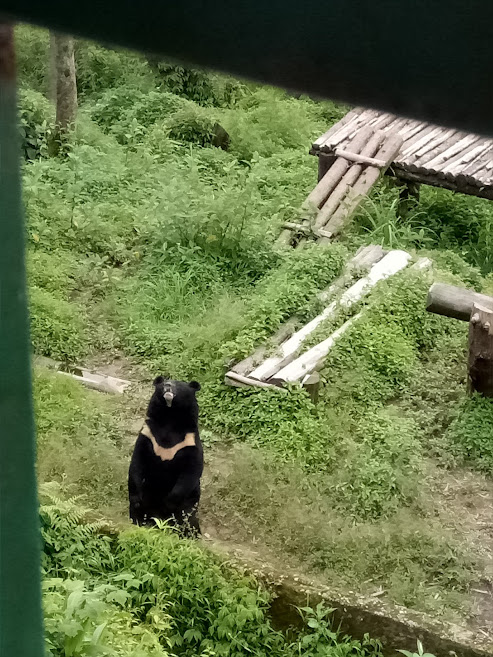
Himalayan black bear in Khangchendzonga National Park

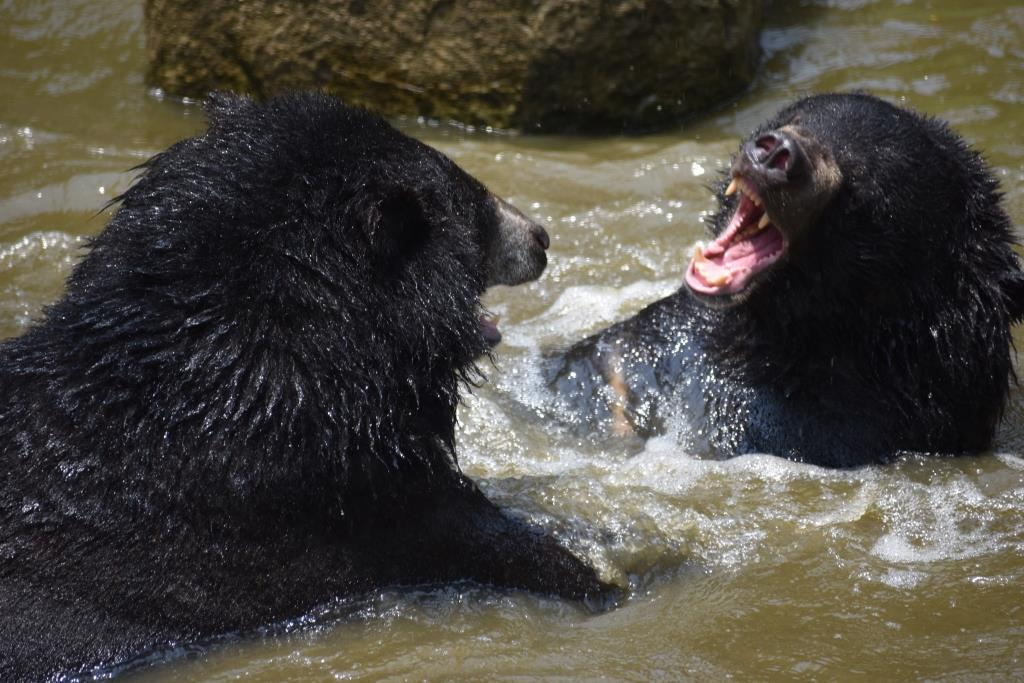
Bears playing or fighting in the water

=== Diet ===
Several authors reported that the bear shifts their habitats following a change in food abundance, i.e., the seasonal migration of bears at different altitudes change with the food availability. They are omnivorous creatures (like most bears) and will eat just about anything. Their diet consists of acorns, nuts, fruit, honey, roots, and various insects such as termites and beetle larvae. If food is scarce, they may turn to eating livestock such as sheep, goats, and cattle. In spring black bear nourishes itself by using juicy flora; following summer it takes insects, fruits, and different vegetation while in autumn it feeds on nuts and acorns, simultaneously taking a high ratio of meat. During autumn, it moves and covers a long distance to explore food for survival just before the hibernation when food requirements increase, resulting in high conflict by the end of autumn.

It is physiologically adapted for arboreal feeding, with its relatively heavy front quarters and short curved claws providing support for its frugivorous feeding habits. The species mainly ate soft mast (e.g., Prunus spp., Rubus spp., Machilus spp. and Ziziphus spina-christi), hard mast (e. g. Quercus spp., Pinus spp., Fagus spp. and Juglans spp.), green vegetation, crops (such as maize, millet and potato), cultivated fruits (date palm, pear, banana, papaya, apple and peach), mammals and insects.

=== Breeding ===
They reach sexual maturity at approximately three years. Mating occurs in October with usually two cubs born in February, while the mother is still hibernating. The offspring usually stay with their mother into the second year.

== Status, threats and future conservation implications ==
This subspecies is listed as 'vulnerable' due to encroachment of human population, forest fires and the timber industries; these have all reduced the bear's habitat. There is also a high mortality rate among the newborn. And even though hunting of the black bear has been forbidden since 1977, there is still a large problem with poaching.

Over the last thirty years, the world black bear population has declined by 30–40% and it is predicted that the same rate will continue for the next thirty years unless effective conservation measures are implemented. Habitat fragmentation, habitat loss and destruction, conversion of bear habitat into agricultural land as well as other anthropogenic pressures are significantly influencing the black bear population and its habitat Climate change is predicted to cause a shift in the existing suitable area or increase the suitable area for the Asiatic black bears, leading to disturbances in habitat connectivity.

Research suggests that more than 70% of suitable habitat in the Himalayan Black Bear habitat will remain as climate refugia in the future, but a reduction of more than 25% in suitable habitat could be challenging, especially in cases of transboundary bear populations. In countries with low bear populations, such as Nepal and Bangladesh, the reduction in suitable habitat could be most severe. Thus, establishing movement corridors between these protected areas is a key means for helping to conserve this species.
