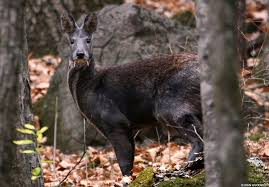
- Male in Afghanistan.

Conservation status
- Endangered (IUCN 3.1)
- CITES Appendix I (Note: Only populations of Afghanistan, Bhutan, India, Myanmar, Nepal, and Pakistan. All other populations are included in Appendix II.)

Scientific classification
- Kingdom: Animalia
- Phylum: Chordata
- Class: Mammalia
- Order: Artiodactyla
- Family: Moschidae
- Genus: Moschus
- Species: M. cupreus

Binomial name
- Moschus cupreus Grubb, 1982
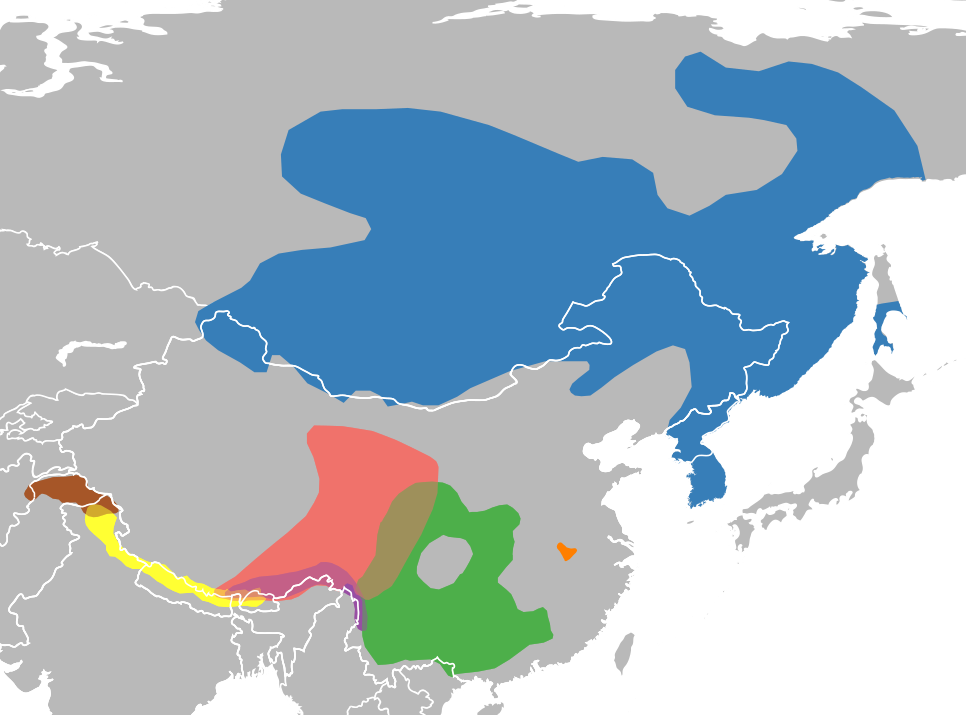
- Moschidae distribution. Moschus cupreus in brown.

= Kashmir musk deer =

Species of mammal

The Kashmir musk deer (Moschus cupreus) is an endangered species of musk deer native to Afghanistan, India, Nepal and Pakistan. It was originally described as a subspecies to the alpine musk deer, but is now classified as a separate species. It stands at 60 cm (24 in) tall, and only males have tusks which they use during mating season to compete for females.

In summer, it inhabits remote alpine scrub on scattered rock outcrops and in upper fringes of closed coniferous forests at an elevation of 3,000–3,500 m (9,800–11,500 ft) using invariably use steep slopes (≥ 20°). It is endangered due to habitat loss and also because of poachers hunting the animal for its prized scent glands.

In Afghanistan, no musk deer sighting had been scientifically reported from 1948 until 2009. In June 2009, three individuals were detected in the Nuristan Province, showing that it still persists in the country despite unregulated hunting, extensive deforestation, habitat degradation, and the absence of the rule of law. Suitable habitat for the Kashmir musk deer in Afghanistan of about 1,300 km^{2} (500 sq mi) in the contiguous Nuristan, Kunar and Laghman Provinces is highly fragmented. Since the Kashmir musk deer is a habitat specialist, it is more susceptible to habitat loss at higher elevations and in an ecosystem with specific resources and vegetation. Other than poaching, human activity also impacts the Kashmir musk deer population because livestock grazing, urban expansion, and the collection of wood damage the montane habitat.
