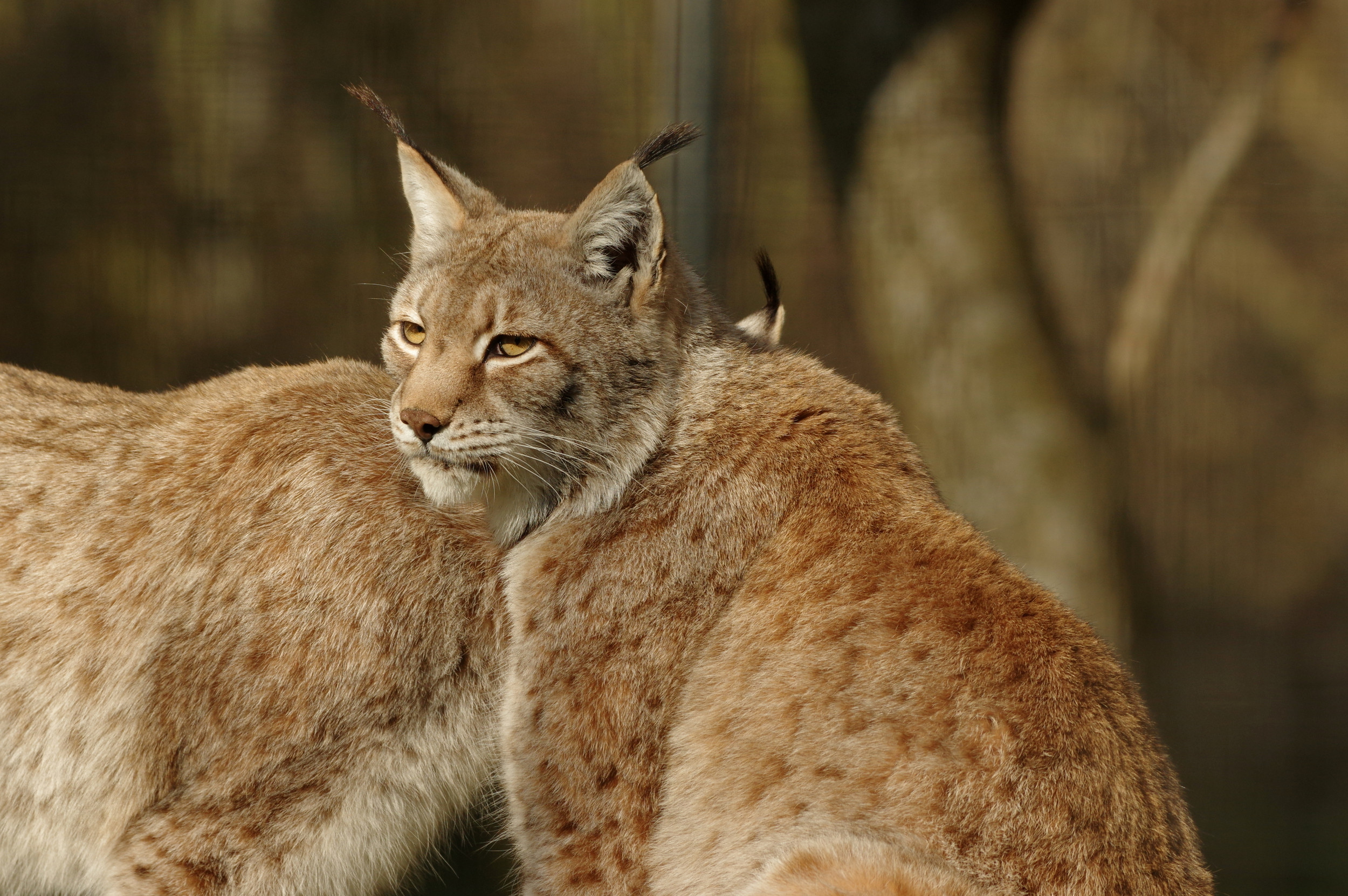

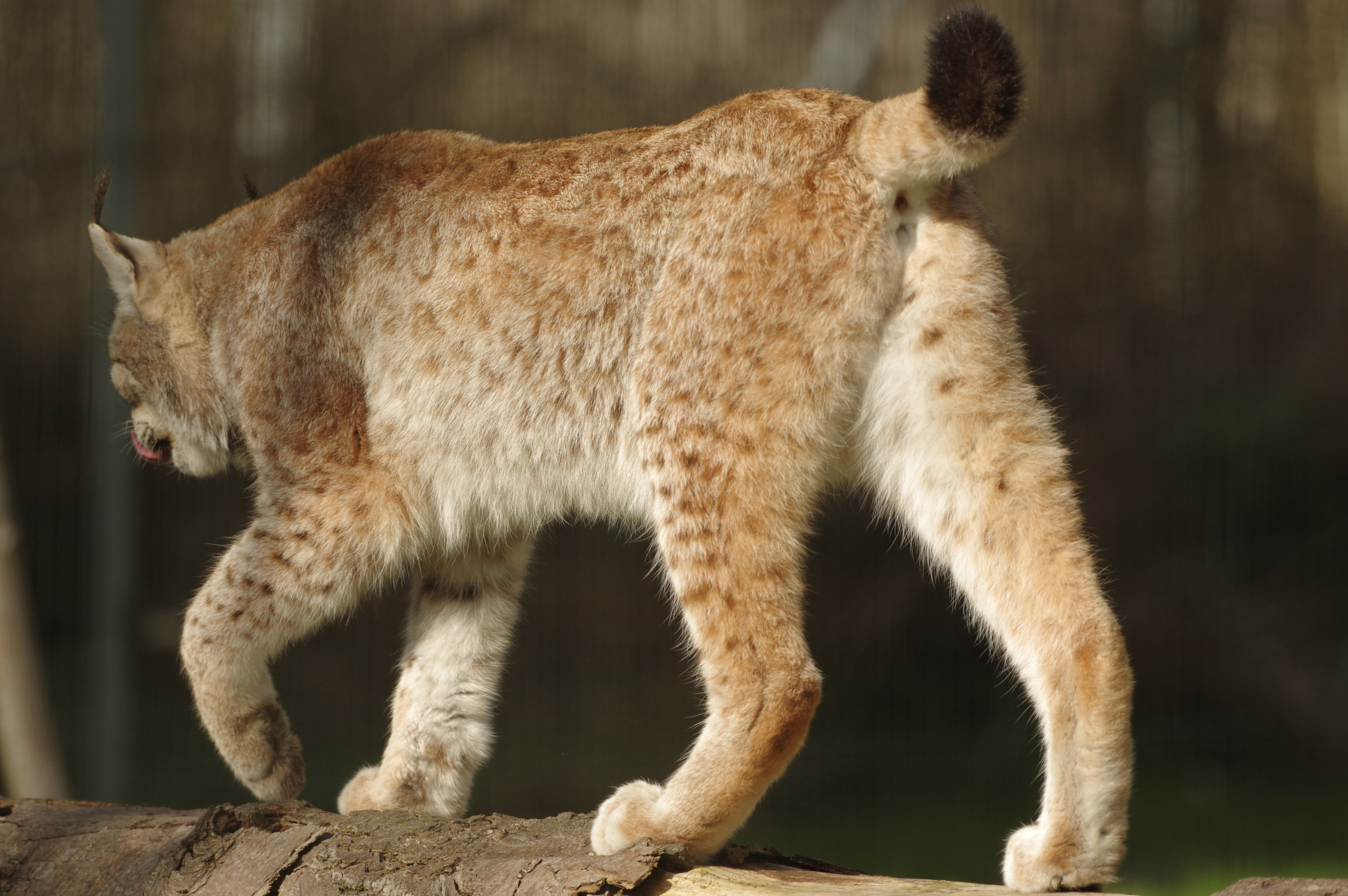

Scientific classification
- Kingdom: Animalia
- Phylum: Chordata
- Class: Mammalia
- Infraclass: Placentalia
- Order: Carnivora
- Family: Felidae
- Genus: Lynx
- Species: L. lynx
- Subspecies: L. l. isabellinus

Trinomial name
- Lynx lynx isabellinus (Blyth, 1847)

Synonyms
- Lynx lynx tibetanus (Gray, 1863), Lynx lynx kamensis (Satunin, 1905)

= Turkestan lynx =

Subspecies of carnivore

The Turkestan lynx (Lynx lynx isabellinus), also known as the Central Asian, Tibetan or Himalayan lynx, is a subspecies of the Eurasian lynx (Lynx lynx) distributed in Central Asia and in the Himalayas.

== Taxonomy ==
Felis isabellina was the scientific name proposed by Edward Blyth in 1847, upon his examination of a lynx skin from Tibet. Lynx lynx wardi was proposed by Richard Lydekker in 1904, though many authors considered it synonymous to L. lynx isabelinus. Further investigations are needed to determine its status as a separate subspecies or not. Currently, wardi is sometimes regarded as a synonym to isabellinus. Some findings of Kazakhstani lynx haplotypes support the classification of the Altai lynx (L. l. wardi) as a separate subspecies from Turkestan lynx (L. l. isabellinus).

== Distribution and habitat ==
The Turkestan lynx occurs in Kazakhstan, Uzbekistan, Turkmenistan, Kyrgyzstan, Tajikistan, Afghanistan, India, Pakistan, Nepal, Bhutan and Tibet Autonomous Region of China. It lives mostly at higher elevations, in open woodland and steppe habitats with rocky slopes, caves and multiple safe hiding places. In the Indian Himalayas, individuals were sighted at an elevation of 4,900 m (16,100 ft) in Hemis National Park, and at 4,800 m (15,700 ft) on the Changtang Plateau, both in Ladakh. In Kazakhstan, the Turkestan lynx occurs in the Tian Shan and Dzungarian Alatau Mountains, which play a significant role in maintaining the stability of the population in its northwestern range.

== Conservation ==
The Turkestan lynx has been protected under Schedule I of India's Wild Life (Protection) Act, 1972. In Afghanistan, it is considered threatened. It is listed as Near Threatened on Pakistan's and Mongolia's national Red Lists. It is listed as Endangered in China, Turkmenistan, Tajikistan and as Vulnerable in Nepal, Kazakhstan and Uzbekistan.
