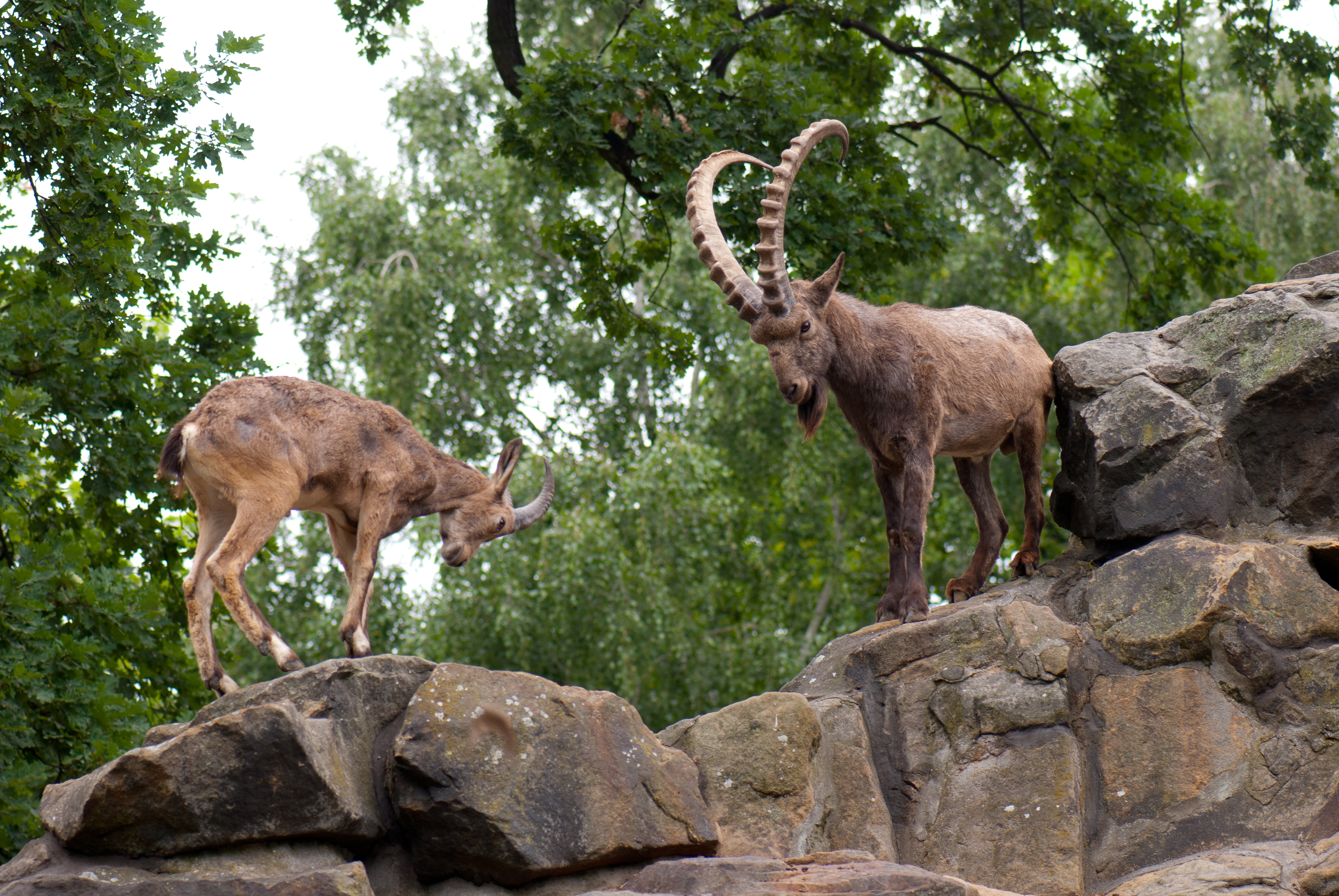
- Female and male at the Berlin Zoological Garden, Germany

Conservation status
- Near Threatened (IUCN 3.1)
- CITES Appendix III

Scientific classification
- Kingdom: Animalia
- Phylum: Chordata
- Class: Mammalia
- Order: Artiodactyla
- Family: Bovidae
- Subfamily: Caprinae
- Genus: Capra
- Species: C. sibirica

Binomial name
- Capra sibirica Pallas, 1776
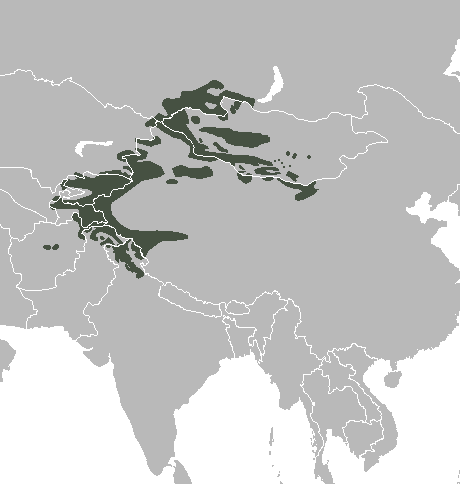
- Range of the Siberian ibex

= Siberian ibex =

Species of mammal

The Siberian ibex (Capra sibirica), also known by regional names including Altai ibex, Asian ibex, Central Asian ibex, Gobi ibex, Himalayan ibex, Mongolian ibex, and Tian Shan ibex, is a polytypic species of ibex, a wild relative of goats and sheep. It lives in Central Asia, and is, by far, the most widely distributed species in the genus Capra. In terms of population stability, Siberian ibex are currently ranked as near threatened. Low densities (in most areas) and overall decline; still, reliable data is minimal and difficult to come by, in addition to the animals' expansive natural range, so accurate observations are still scant. The Siberian ibex has formerly been treated as a subspecies of the Eurasian Alpine ibex, and whether or not it is a single species or a complex of distinct units that stand out as genetically-distinct (at species level) is still not entirely clear. The Siberian ibex is the longest and heaviest member of the genus Capra, though its shoulder height is slightly surpassed by the markhor.

== Appearance ==
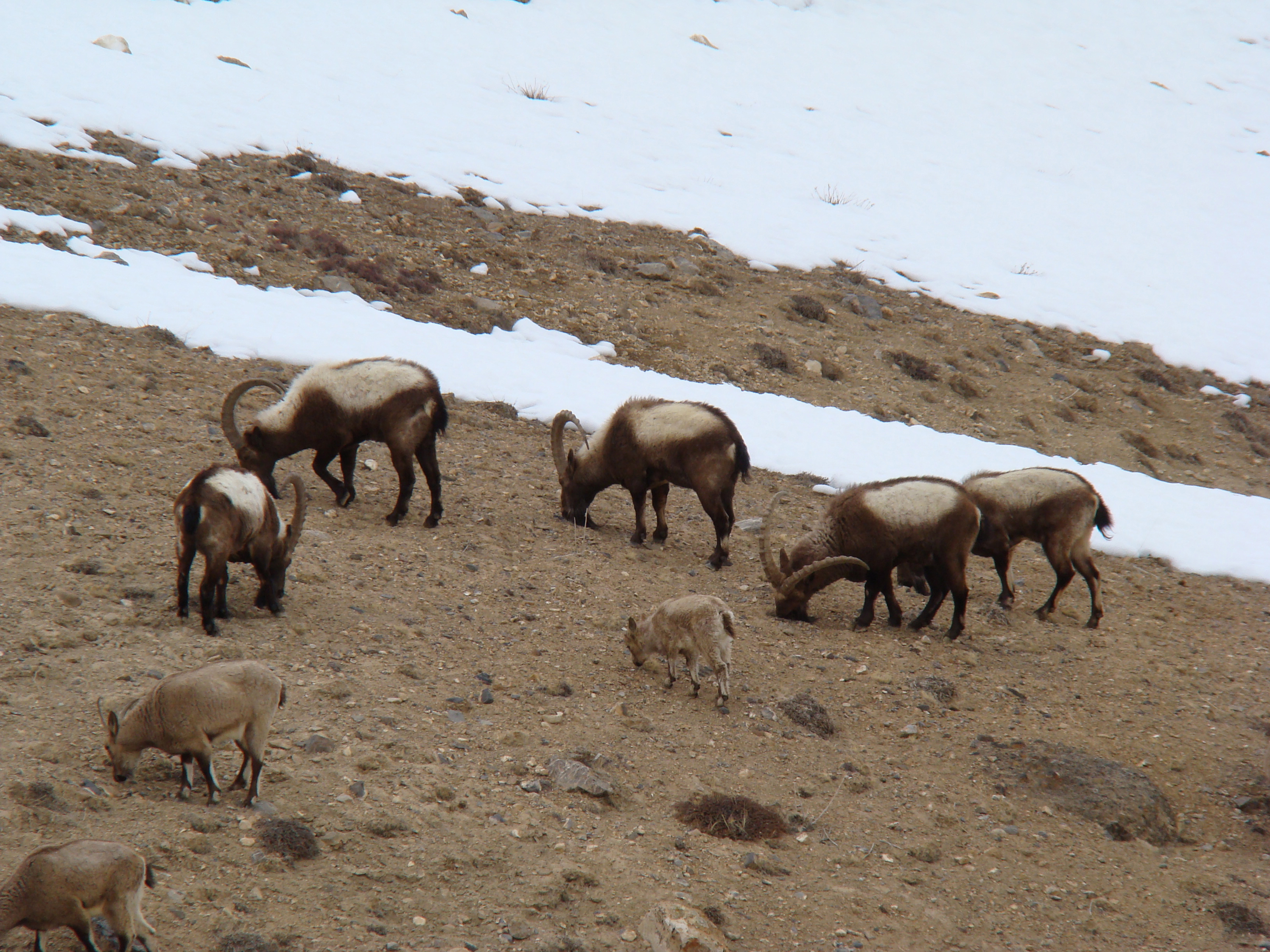
Herd of Siberian ibex

Siberian ibexes are large and heavily built goats, although individual sizes vary greatly. Males are between 88 and 110 cm (35 and 43 in) in shoulder height, and weigh between 60 and 130 kg (130 and 290 lb). Females are noticeably smaller, with heights between 67 and 92 cm (26 and 36 in), and weights between 34 and 56 kg (75 and 123 lb). The nose is straight in profile, the neck short, and the back straight. The neck is also particularly thick and muscular in males, but much less so in females. Both sexes have beards, although the male's beard is more pronounced, and those of females are sometimes absent altogether. Both sexes also possess a large scent gland, about 3 cm (1.2 in) across, beneath the tail.

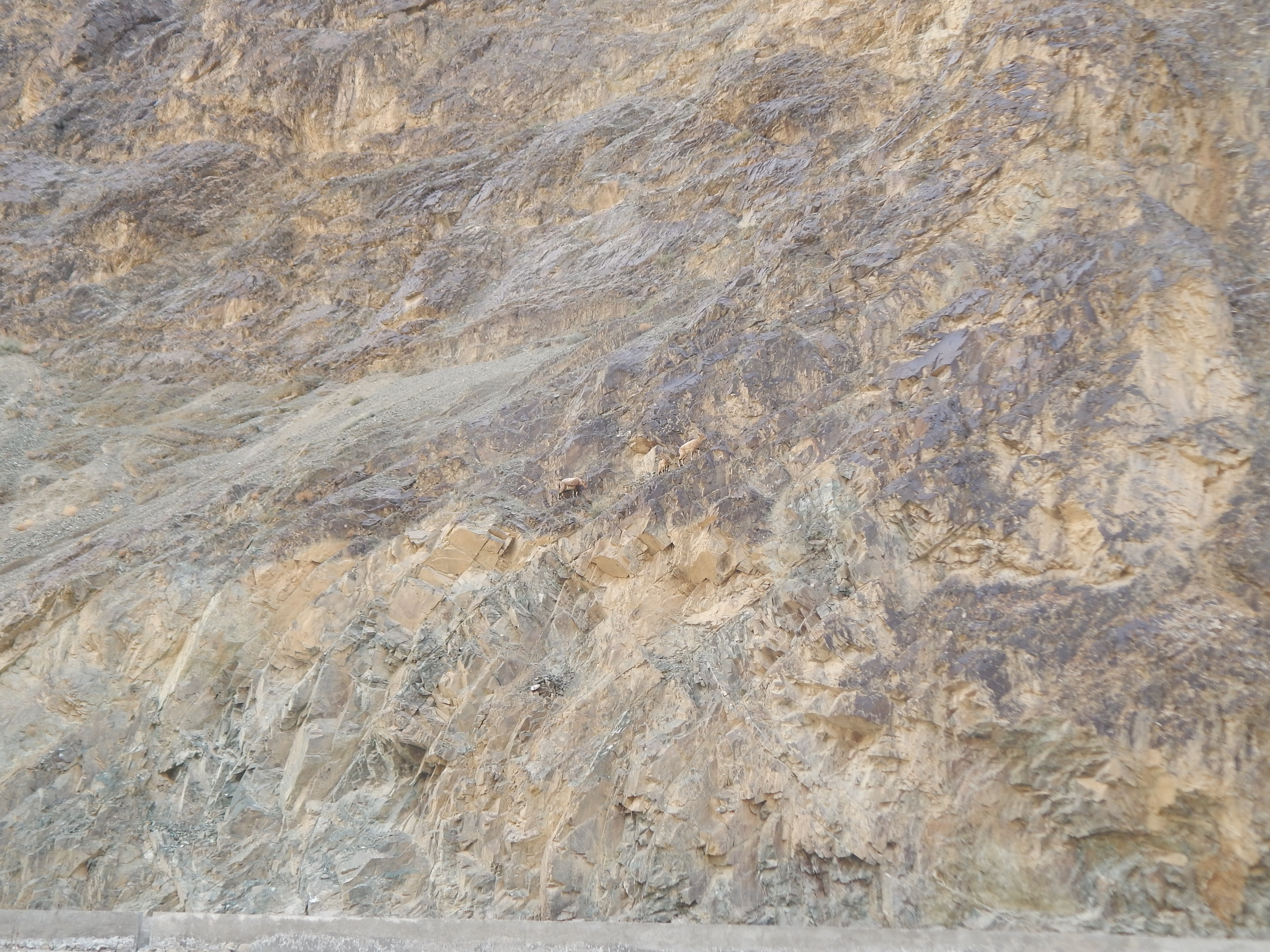
The coat of Siberian ibex is well suited for camouflage in mountains with low or no vegetation.

The female's horns are relatively small, and grey-brown in colour, measuring an average of 27 cm (11 in) long. Those of fully-grown males are black and typically measure about 115 cm (45 in), although in extreme cases they can grow to 148 cm (58 in). Both sexes have circular rings around their horns that represent annual growth, but males also have large transverse ridges along the front surface. The exact shape of the horns varies considerably between individuals.

The colouration is also variable, from dark brown to light tan, with some reddish individuals. There is usually a stripe of darker hair down the centre of the back and onto the tail, and some males have saddle-like patches on the back in the winter. The undersides are paler, and, in the winter, mature males becoming much darker with white patches. Females and infants are generally more bland in colour than the adult males, and do not always have the stripe down the back. Siberian ibexes typically moult between April and July, developing their paler summer coat, which continues to grow and become darker as the year progresses, reaching the full winter condition around December.

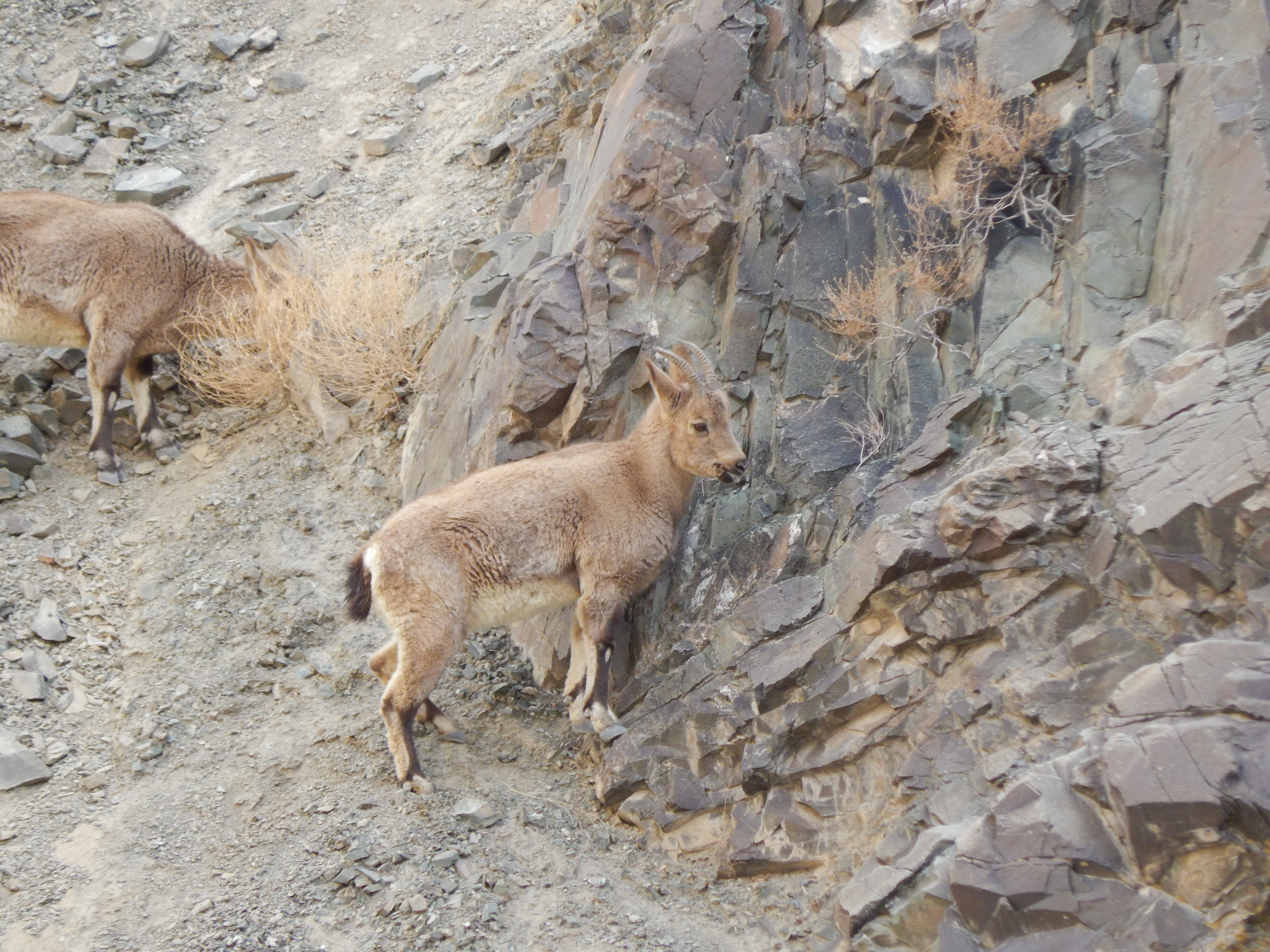
Females near Kargil, Ladakh, India

=== Subspecies ===
Though some recent authorities treat the species as monotypic, others have recognized four subspecies, based mainly on differences in total size, size of horns and colour of pelage:

- C. s. sibirica (Siberian or Altai Ibex) – Sayan Mountains
- C. s. alaiana (Tian Shan Ibex) – Alay Mountains
- C. s. hagenbecki (Gobi or Mongolian Ibex) – western Mongolia
- C. s. sakeen (Himalayan Ibex) – Pamir Mountains, western Himalayas, India, Afghanistan, and Pakistan

== Reproduction ==
The rut takes place from late October to early January. During the rut, the males spend considerable effort courting females, and they are often emaciated from lack of grazing by the time it ends. Courtship lasts for over 30 minutes, and consists of licking, ritualised postures, and flehmen if the female urinates. Males compete for dominance during the rut, rearing up on their hind legs and clashing their horns together.

Gestation lasts 170 to 180 days, and usually results in the birth of a single kid, although twins occur in up to 14% of births, and triplets are born on rare occasions. Newborn kids weigh about 3 kg (6.6 lb), and grow rapidly during their first year. The horns are visible after about three to four weeks. They begin to eat grass as little as eight days after birth, but do not do so regularly until they are about one month old, and are not fully weaned until six months.

Males are sexually mature at eighteen months, but do not reach their full adult size for nine years. Females first breed in their second year. Males typically live for ten years in the wild, and females for up to seventeen years. They have been reported to live for up to 22 years in captivity.

== Behavior ==
Usually living at high elevations, sometimes at the vegetation line and well above the tree line, Siberian ibexes seek out lower slopes during the winter in search of food. They have also been known to seek out tree lines on hot days, but they do not enter forested areas, preferring to return to their alpine habitat when the weather has cooled. When snow is heavy, they have to paw away snow to reach the vegetation below.

Their diet primarily consists of alpine grasses and herbs. During spring and summer, grasses and sedges form the bulk of their diet, while during winter they eat more tall herbs, and the twigs and needles of trees such as aspen, spruce, juniper, and willow. During the summer, they often visit salt licks. Herds vary in size depending on the local population; about 5-30 is most common, although they can become much larger during the rut. Outside of the rut, most herds are single-sex, although some mixed-sex herds persist throughout the year. Herds spend much of the day grazing, spending an hour or more at each location before moving on.

Males and female exhibit different behaviors in choosing feeding grounds, herd size, and protection. Although there are several herds consisting of both, herds can be divided by sex and food availability. In times of high vegetation, groups are larger with less competition for resources. Diet overlap between females and males and mixed-sex herds increase during the winter, but decrease in the summer. Since females prioritize health and safety of their offspring, they are more frequently near water sources and spread around elevations with the most nutrient-rich vegetation, as well as increasing their vigilance towards predators.

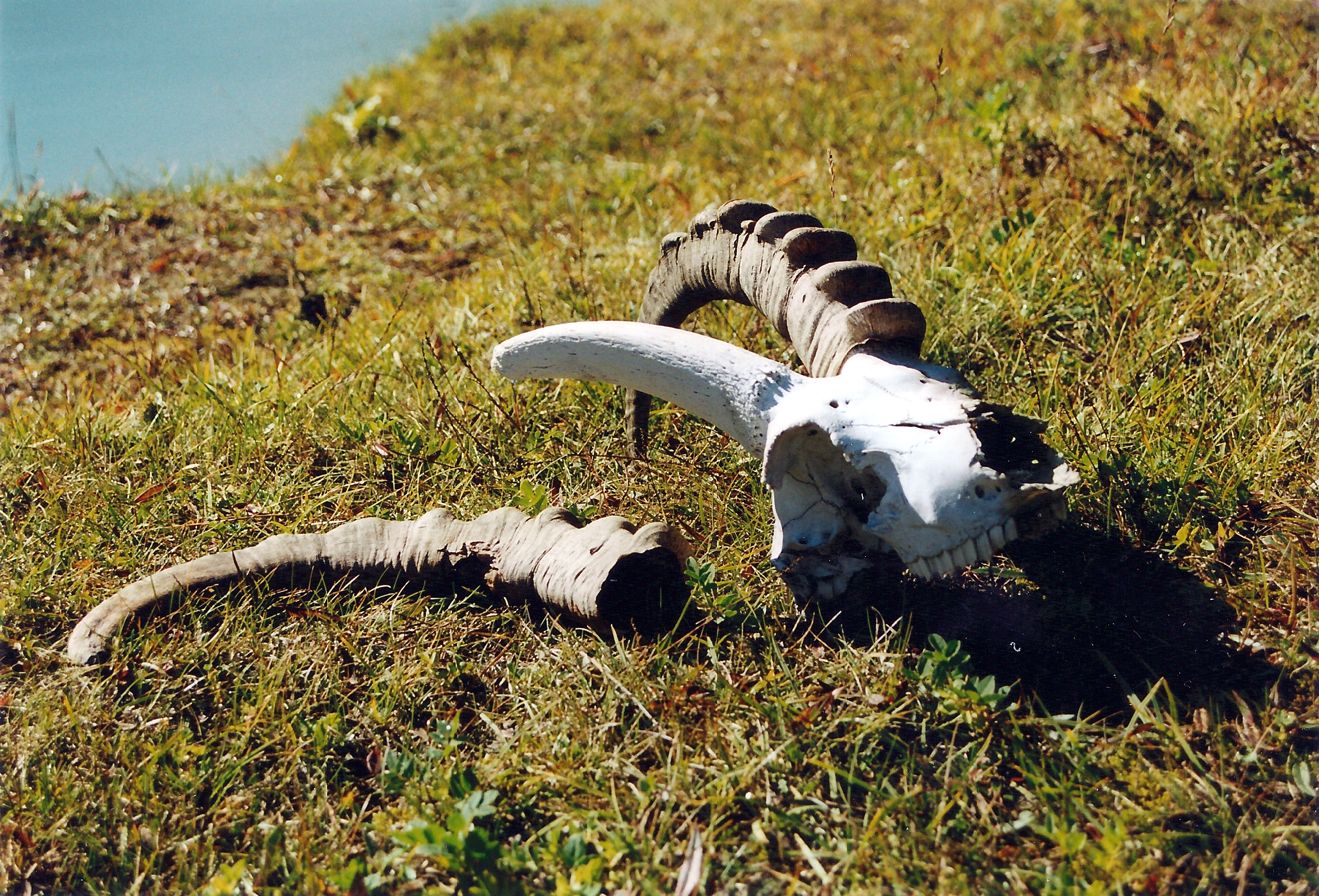
A Siberian ibex skull.

The main predators of Siberian ibex are Himalayan wolves, dholes, Siberian tigers, Amur leopards, snow leopards, and brown bears; young ibex may also fall prey to lynxes, foxes, and eagles.

== Habitat and distribution ==
Siberian ibexes live mostly above the tree line, in areas of steep slopes and rocky scree. Their habitat consists of a mixture of high altitude steppe, alpine meadows, and regions of semidesert. In the Gobi Desert, they may be found on hills as low as 700 m (2,300 ft), but they are more commonly found between about 2,000 and 5,000 metres (6,600 and 16,400 ft) in summer, descending to lower, sometimes sparsely forested, slopes during the winter. In Tajikistan, the ibex distribution is controlled by climatic variables such as seasonal temperature and precipitation of warmest quarter. Most Siberian ibexes are seen in central and northern Asia, Afghanistan, western and northern China (primarily Xinjiang), north-western India, south-eastern Kazakhstan, Kyrgyzstan, Tajikistan, eastern Uzbekistan, Mongolia, northern Pakistan, and south-central Russia. In 1978, 40 Siberian ibexes were introduced into the Canadian River canyon of New Mexico in the United States and a small population has been established. In Pakistan, the species' historical range extended from Swat to Khunjerab; however, it has since contracted to the country's extreme northern regions due to anthropogenic pressures and climate change. In the official 2024–25 survey, the total population count of Himalayan ibex in Gilgit-Baltistan, Pakistan was found to stand at 7,294.

== Tributes ==
The Ladakh Scouts regiment of the Indian Army has the ibex as its mascot. The Ashina Dynasty of the Turkic Khaganate, had a Siberian ibex on their tamga.
