= List of wildlife sanctuaries in Pakistan =

This is a list of wildlife sanctuaries in Pakistan recognized by IUCN.

== Wildlife sanctuaries ==
1. Argam Basti Wildlife Sanctuary
2. Astore Wildlife Sanctuary
3. Bajwat Wildlife Sanctuary
4. Baltistan Wildlife Sanctuary
5. Bijoro Chach Wildlife Sanctuary
6. Borraka Wildlife Sanctuary
7. Buzi Makola Wildlife Sanctuary
8. Chashma and Taunsa Barrage Dolphin Sanctuary
9. Cholistan Wildlife Sanctuary
10. Chorani Wildlife Sanctuary
11. Chotiari Wetland
12. Chumbi Surla Wildlife Sanctuary
13. Cut Munarki Chach Wildlife Sanctuary
14. Daphar Wildlife Sanctuary
15. Deh Akro Wildlife Sanctuary
16. Dhoung Block Wildlife Sanctuary
17. Drigh Lake Wildlife Sanctuary
18. Dureji Wildlife Sanctuary
19. Ghondak Dhono Wildlife Sanctuary
20. Gullel Kohri Wildlife Sanctuary
21. Gulsher Dhand Wildlife Sanctuary
22. Hub Dam Wildlife Sanctuary
23. Hadero Lake Wildlife Sanctuary
24. Haleji Wildlife Sanctuary
25. Haleji Lake Wildlife Sanctuary
26. Islamabad Wildlife Sanctuary
27. Kachau Wildlife Sanctuary
28. Kargah Wildlife Sanctuary
29. Keti Bunder South Wildlife Sanctuary
30. Khadi Wildlife Sanctuary
31. Kharar Lake Wildlife Sanctuary
32. Khat Dhoro Wildlife Sanctuary
33. Kinjhar Lake Wildlife Sanctuary
34. Koh-e-Geish Wildlife Sanctuary
35. Kolwah Kap Wildlife Sanctuary
36. Kot Dinghano Wildlife Sanctuary
37. Lakhi Wildlife Sanctuary
38. Lehri Nature Park
39. Mahal Kohistan Wildlife Sanctuary
40. Majiran Wildlife Sanctuary
41. Manglot Wildlife Park
42. Manshi Wildlife Sanctuary
43. Marho Kotri Wildlife Sanctuary
44. Maslakh Wildlife Sanctuary
45. Mehrano Wildlife Sanctuary
46. Miani Dhand Wildlife Sanctuary
47. Mohabat Doro Wildlife Sanctuary
48. Munarki Wildlife Sanctuary
49. Naltar Wildlife Sanctuary
50. Nara Desert Wildlife Sanctuary
51. Nemal Lake Wildlife Sanctuary
52. Norange Wildlife Sanctuary
53. Overa Aru Wildlife Sanctuary
54. Raghai Rakhshan Wildlife Sanctuary
55. Ras Koh Wildlife Sanctuary
56. Rasool Barrage Wildlife Sanctuary
57. Rann of Kutch Wildlife Sanctuary
58. Sadnani Wildlife Sanctuary
59. Salkhala Wildlife Sanctuary
60. Salpara Wildlife Sanctuary
61. Samno Dhand Wildlife Sanctuary
62. Sasnamana Wildlife Sanctuary
63. Shah Lando Wildlife Sanctuary
64. Shashan Wildlife Sanctuary
65. Sheikh Buddin Wildlife Sanctuary
66. Sodhi Wildlife Sanctuary
67. Takkar Wildlife Sanctuary
68. Taunsa Barrage Wildlife Sanctuary
69. Ziarat Juniper Wildlife Sanctuary

== See also ==
- Game reserves of Pakistan
- Forestry in Pakistan
- List of National Parks of Pakistan
- Wildlife of Pakistan
