= Murree-Kotli Sattian-Kahuta National Park =

National park in Pakistan

Murree–Kotli Sattian–Kahuta National Park
- IUCN category II (national park)
- Interactive map of Murree–Kotli Sattian–Kahuta National Park
- Location: Rawalpindi District, Punjab, Pakistan
- Nearest city: Murree
- Coordinates: 33.75°N 73.45°E
- Area: 473.7 km^{2} (182.9 sq mi)
- Established: 2020
- Governing body: Punjab Wildlife & Parks Department

Murree–Kotli Sattian–Kahuta National Park (MKSNP) is a protected area located in the northeastern part of Rawalpindi District, Punjab Province, Pakistan. It was declared in November 2020 under the Protected Areas Initiative launched by the Government of Pakistan to expand the country's network of national parks.

== Geography ==
The park spans the hill ranges of Murree, Kotli Sattian, and Kahuta in the northeastern part of Rawalpindi District within the western Himalayan foothills of the Pothohar Plateau. The official gazette notification issued by the Government of Punjab in 2023 defines the park’s total area as 117,004 acres (47,350 ha).

Scientific surveys prior to the formal notification described the broader landscape as extending between coordinates 33°21′–34°01′N and 73°11′–73°38′E, with an elevation range from roughly 500 metres (1,600 ft) in the south to 2,270 metres (7,450 ft) on the upper ridges of Murree and Patriata. Later syntheses place the typical park elevations between 800 metres (2,600 ft) and 2,100 metres (6,900 ft), noting steep valleys, Pine–oak forest, and riparian belts draining toward the Jhelum River.

The IUCN described the park's landscape in 2022 as part of a corridor connecting protected areas across Punjab, Islamabad, and Azad Jammu and Kashmir, emphasizing its role in habitat continuity and watershed protection.

== Biodiversity ==
The park lies within the Himalayan subtropical pine forests ecoregion and contains vegetation dominated by Pinus roxburghii (chir pine), Quercus incana (grey oak), Acacia modesta, Dodonaea viscosa, and associated scrub and grass species.

Recorded fauna include the leopard (Panthera pardus), Rhesus macaque (Macaca mulatta), Asiatic jackal (Canis aureus indicus), Indian pangolin (Manis crassicaudata), red fox (Vulpes vulpes), and several species of small cats and civets. Avifauna features the Himalayan monal (Lophophorus impejanus), kalij pheasant (Lophura leucomelanos), koklass pheasant (Pucrasia macrolopha), and numerous migratory birds moving seasonally between Rawal Lake and the upper Himalayan valleys.

== Establishment and management ==
The notification of Murree–Kotli Sattian–Kahuta National Park was issued by the Punjab Wildlife and Parks Department on 21 November 2020 under Section 17 of the Punjab Wildlife (Protection, Preservation, Conservation and Management) Act, 1974. The park forms part of a cluster of protected areas declared in the Pothohar region alongside Tilla Reserve National Park and Kheri Murat National Park.

The department manages the park through its Rawalpindi Wildlife Division, which oversees law enforcement, habitat monitoring, and community-based conservation initiatives. The area also supports controlled eco-tourism activities such as hiking and wildlife observation, implemented under the provincial eco-tourism policy.

== Significance ==
MKSNP acts as an ecological buffer between Margalla Hills National Park to the west and Pir Lasura National Park in Azad Jammu and Kashmir to the east, maintaining landscape-level connectivity for wide-ranging species such as leopards and pheasants. Its forests and catchments provide water regulation and soil protection for the Soan River and Jhelum River systems, which feed downstream cities including Rawalpindi and Islamabad. The park also supports Pakistan’s commitments under the Billion Tree Tsunami programme and the national biodiversity targets adopted through the Convention on Biological Diversity.

== See also ==
- Kheri Murat National Park
- Margalla Hills National Park
- Protected Areas Initiative (Pakistan)
- National parks of Pakistan
