= Chumbi (disambiguation) =

Chumbi may refer to:

- Chumbi Valley, Tibet
  - Chumbi, a town in the Chumbi Valley
  - Chumbi language, also called "Groma language", spoken in the Chumbi Valley
  - Chumbi wall, a species of butterfly
- Chumbi (footballer), Spanish footballer

== See also ==
- Chumbi Surla Wildlife Sanctuary
