= PAF Base Sakesar =

Pakistani radar base in Khushab

PAF Base Sakesar
- Urdu: پی اے ایف بیس سکیسر
- Sakesar, Soon Valley, Punjab province in Pakistan

Site information
- Type: MOB
- Owner: Ministry of Defense
- Operator: Pakistan Air Force
- Controlled by: Air Defence Command
- Open to the public: Partially

Location
- Location of Sakesar Base in Pakistan PAF Base Sakesar (Pakistan) PAF Base Sakesar (Asia)
- Coordinates: 32°32′34″N 71°55′43″E

Site history
- Built: 1960
- Built for: Pakistan Air Force
- Built by: Pakistan
- Battles/wars: Indo-Pakistani conflicts; 1965 Indo-Pakistani war; 1971 Indo-Pakistani war; Operation Sentinel

Garrison information
- Occupants: No. 410 Squadron

Pakistan Air Force Base Sakesar abbreviated (PAF Base Sakesar), Urdu: پی اے ایف بیس سکیسر, is a radar base of the Pakistan Air Force situated in the center of Pakistan. Established at the highest point of the Soon Valley, the base is located 72 kilometres (45 mi) from Mianwali. The area including the base itself is a tourist attraction known for its lush green and cool environment.

== History ==
=== Early years ===
The base's history traces back to 1954 when the Pakistan Air Force selected the Sakesar hilltop for a future high-powered radar installation site. The base's location and height were favorable for providing radar surveillance to West Pakistan's airspace in the northeast. Initially, two Marconni Type-21 radars were deployed in 1958 and in 1961 PAF Station Sakesar was officially established with Wing Commander Amanullah Khan serving as the first station commander. The base's primary air defense squadron, the No. 410 Squadron PAF, was at the time operating a single AN/FPS-20 Early Warning Radar, acquired from the United States under the 1954 US-Pakistan Mutual Defense Treaty. The FPS-20 had been operationalized in 1960 along with a GCI Station and Sector Operations Control Centre (SOC), replacing the old British Marconi Type-21 radars thus providing enhanced radar coverage to PAF aircraft flying in their Area of Responsibility (AoR).

==== 1965 Indo-Pakistani War ====
Under the command of Wing Commander M. Zackaria Butt and personal supervision of then AOC Air Defense Air Commodore Masroor Hossain, the base played a key role in Pakistan's aerial battles during the 1965 war. Being the main hub of air defense and ground control operations alongside PAF Station Badin, the base's control centers oversaw all of PAF combat operations in the northern section of West Pakistan.

Sakesar also remained the main target for the Indian Air Force which executed a number of failed ground attack runs in an attempt to destroy the base's single FPS-20 radar but to no avail as the base was well defended by anti-aircraft guns and well hidden within the surrounding terrain. Notable ground controllers of the base during the war included Squadron Leader Anwar Ahmed Khan and Flight Lieutenants S. Waheed Nabi, Farooq H. Khan and Ejaz A. Khan.

==== 1971 War ====
Sakesar was under the command of Group Captain Rehmat Khan during the 1971 war and actively took part in combat operations throughout the conflict. The initial days of the war saw heavy IAF airstrikes targeting Sakesar. An attack by a pair of Indian Hawker Hunters on 5 December 1971 which executed two strafing and bombing runs damaged the radar antenna. The ground controller Flight Lieutenant Zarrar Shafique had promptly vectored two F-6 Farmer fighters of the PAF's No. 25 Squadron which shot both Hunters down. Later that evening another lone Hunter jet managed to attack Sakesar inflicting further damages. While Indian fighters couldn't achieve their objective of destroying Sakesar's radar due to heavy anti-aircraft and PAF fighter activity, they managed to cause some damage and the radar had to be turned off for 3 days before it was repaired.

=== 1972-2002 ===
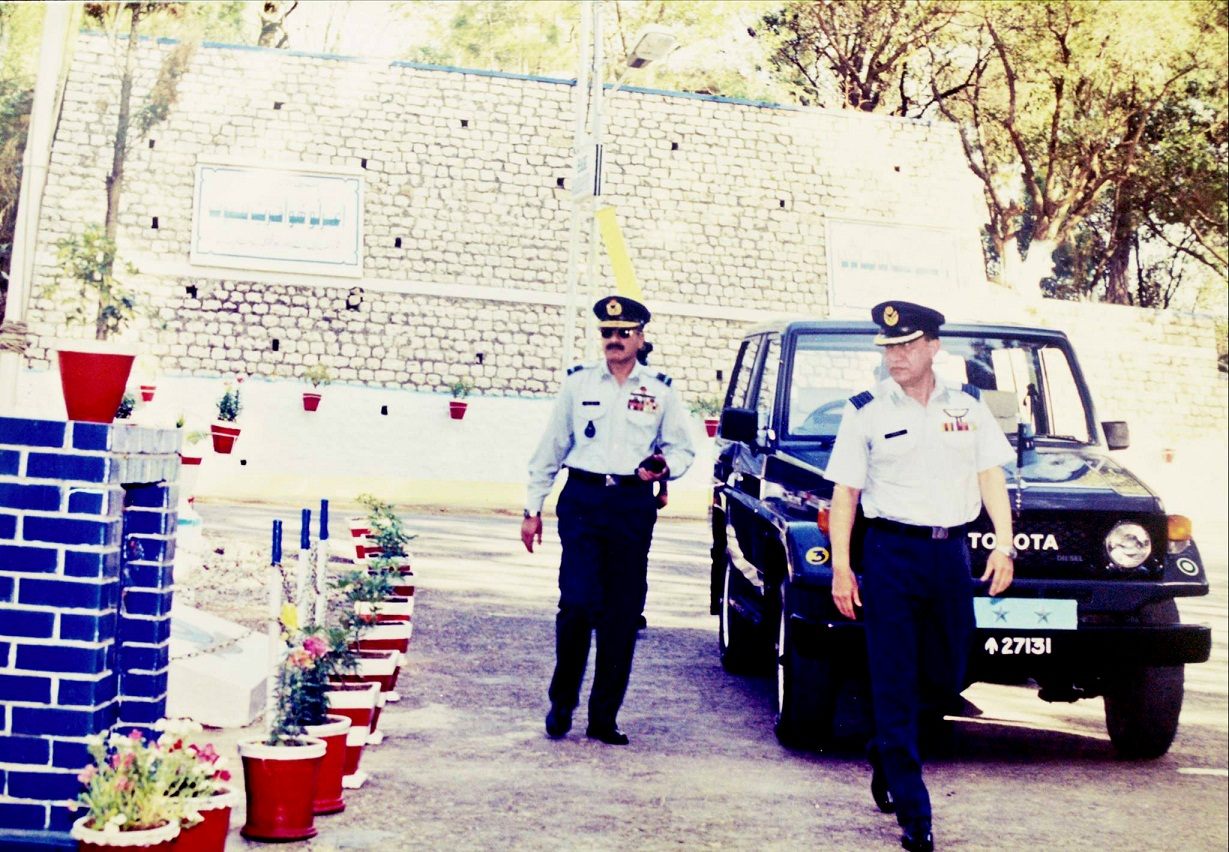
Air Commodore Sadoon Pervaiz Memon (right) serving as the Base Commander of PAF Sakesar.

Under the PAF's air defense PADS-77 modernization and restructuring program, the base saw various major re-alignments in the late 1970s which included the shifting of Air Defense Training School (ADTS) from PAF Base Korangi Creek to Sakesar.

==== Wartime alerts ====
The base remained on high alert during the Kargil conflict in 1999 but more notably in the PAF's Operation Sentinel during the 2001–2002 India–Pakistan standoff. The vintage FPS-20 of No. 410 Squadron which by now was obsolete was replaced with a YLC-2 Radar which was acquired from China at a time were US sanctions under the Pressler amendment were still in effect.

=== Present Day ===
The base currently serves as a Main Operating Base of the PAF's air defense along with PAF Base Malir. A Radome was installed for the base's radars in 2007 to protect them from harsh weather. In 2010, an Archive Gallery was set up at the base's Officer's Mess to preserve Sakesar's history.

== See also ==
- List of Pakistan Air Force bases
- Sdot Micha Airbase
