= Amb Temples =

Hindu temple in Punjab, Pakistan

- امب مندر (Urdu)
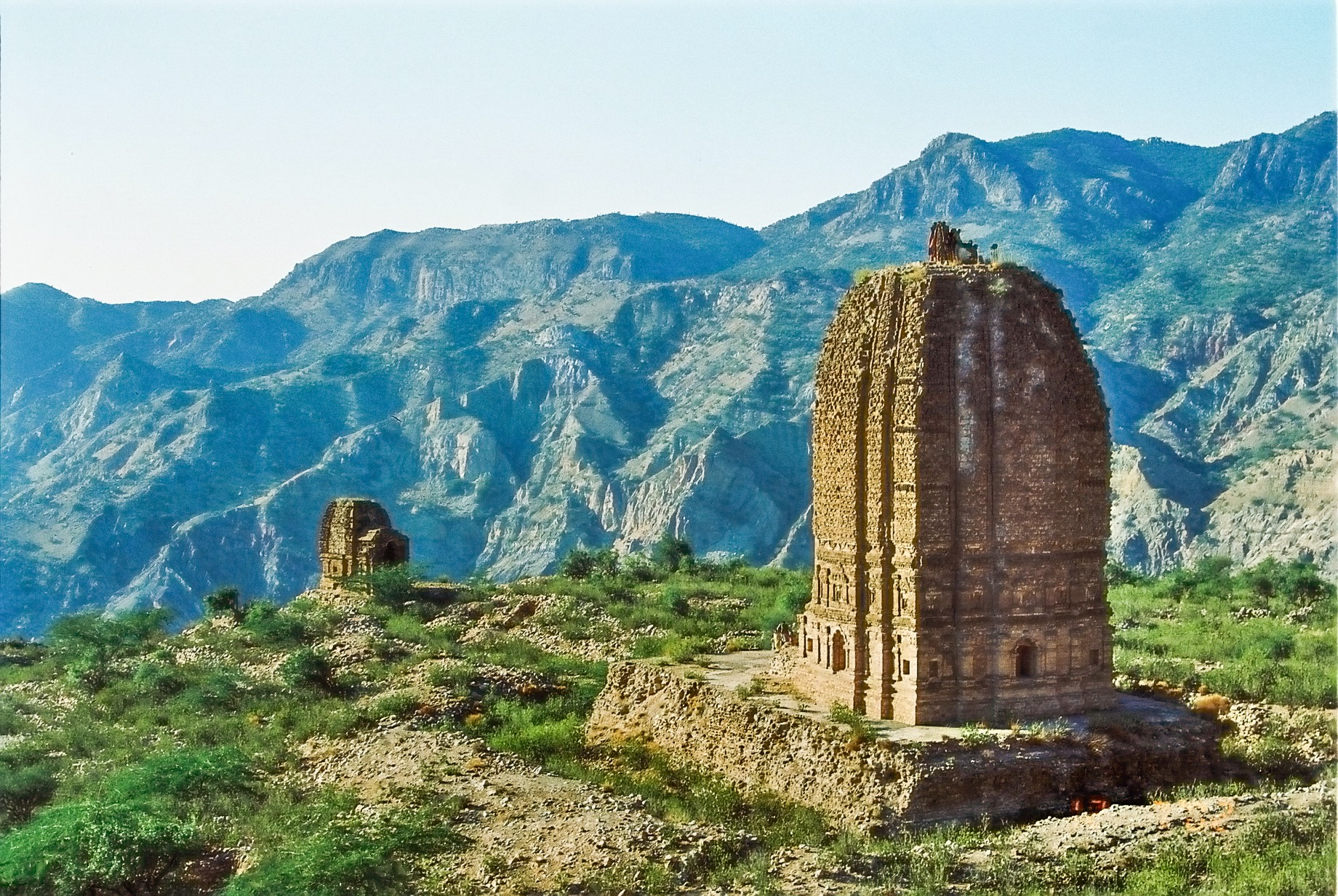
- The site consists of the ruins of two Hindu temples located in Pakistan's Salt Range mountains

- Location within Pakistan Location within South Asia
- 32.508402°N 71.936538°E
- Type: Temple complex
- Periods: Odi Shahi
- Location: Khushab District, Punjab, Pakistan
- Region: Salt Range

History
- Built: 9th–10th centuries CE.

The Amb Temples (Urdu: امب مندر), are part of an abandoned Hindu temple complex located at the western edge of the Salt Range in Punjab, Pakistan. The temple complex was built in Gandhara Nagara style in the 9th to 10th centuries CE by the Odi Shahi dynasty.

== Location ==
The ruins are located near Amb Sharif village, on the Sakesar peak in the Soon Valley. The ruins form the westernmost ruins of a string of Hindu temples in the Salt Range that includes the Katas Raj Temples and Tilla Jogian monastic complex.

== Architecture ==
The main temple, termed 'Temple B' by Michael W. Meister in his monograph on Odi Shahi temples, is roughly 15 metres tall, and built of kanjūr, a porous sedimentary rock widely used in Gandhara architecture, and mortar on a square plinth. It is regarded as the "loftiest" of temples built by the Odi Shahis. The temple ruins have three stories, with stairwells leading to inner ambulatories.

The temple is decorated with Kashmiri style motifs on its exterior, including a cusped niche. The structure of the main temple, differs from Kashmiri temples which typically have pointed tops. The main temple is instead similar in style to the nearby Kalar temple, and Kafir Kot temple in Khyber Pakhtunkhwa province.

To the west about 75 metres lies another smaller temple, termed 'Temple A' by Meister, which is 2 story or 7 to 8 meters high, and situated near a cliff. The temple features a small vestibule chamber facing towards the main temple. It was a few metres from a second similarly sized temple, which no longer exists. The entire temple complex was surrounded by a fortification, with the earliest construction at the site dating to the late Kushan period.

== Conservation ==
The site was visited by Alexander Cunningham in the late 19th century, and was partly conserved in 1922–24 by Daya Ram Sahni. The temple had been looted over the centuries. The last remaining statuary was taken in the late 19th century and placed in the Lahore Museum. The site is currently protected by Pakistan's Antiquities Act (1975).

== Gallery ==
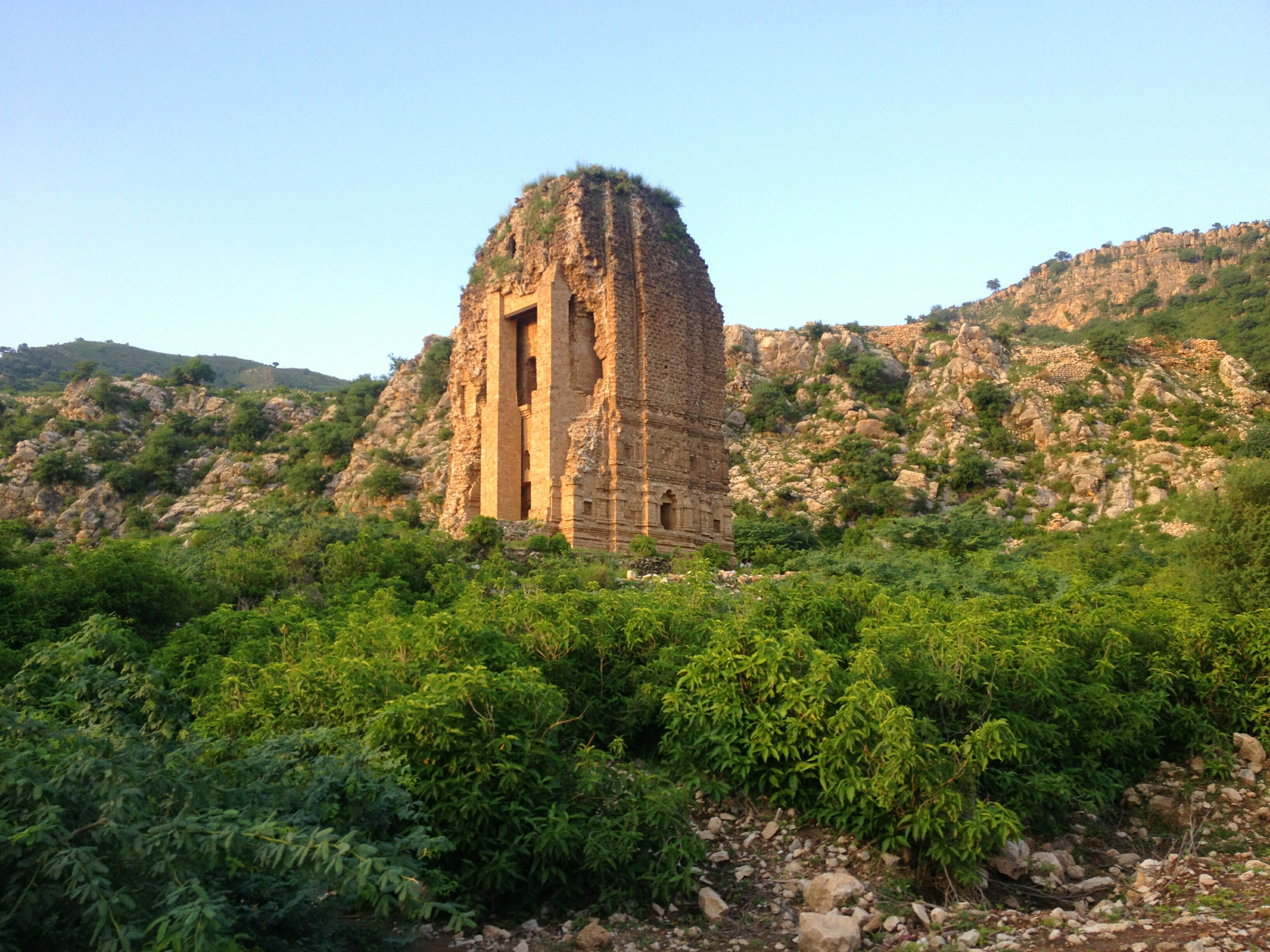
The main temple

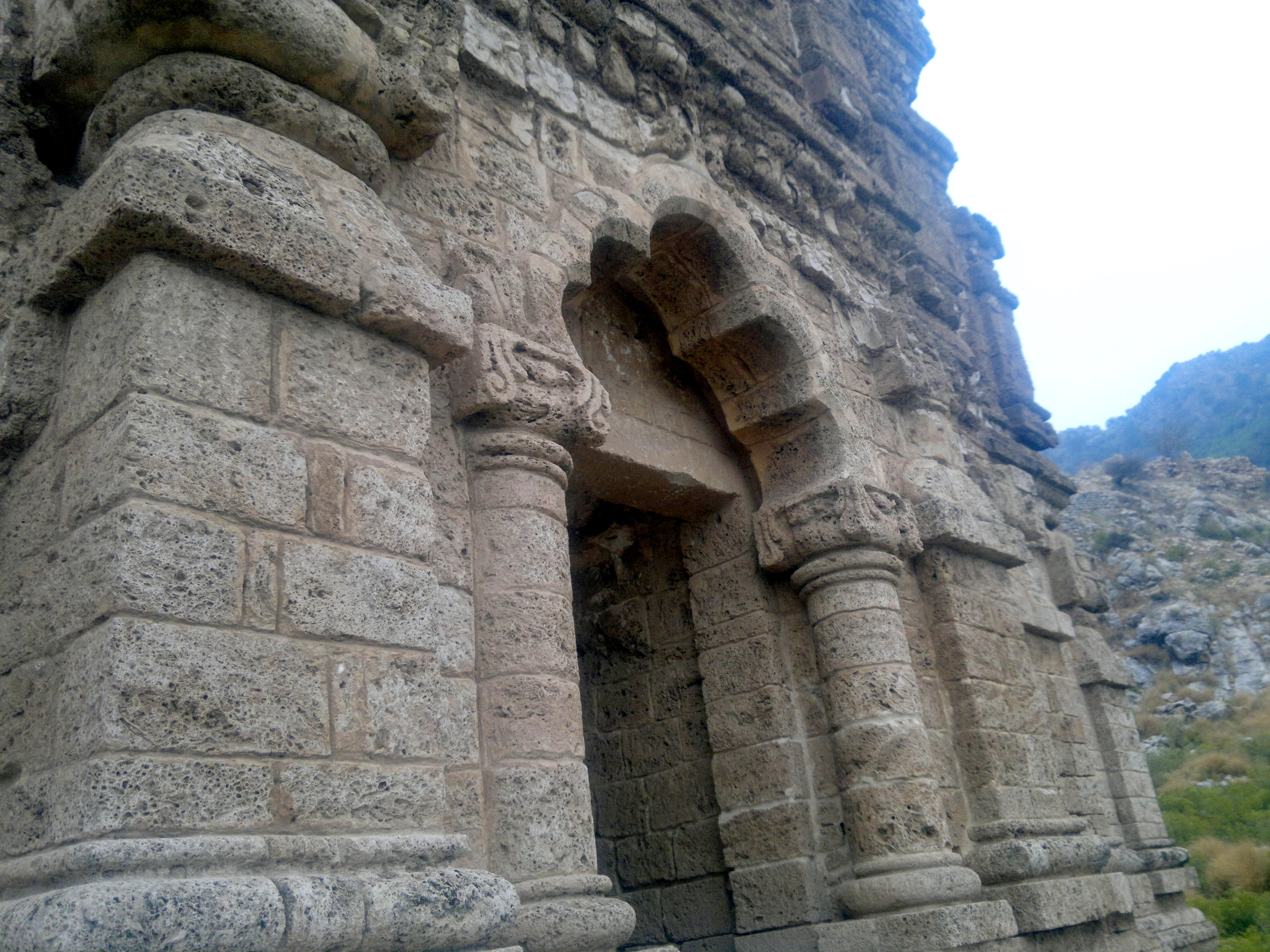
The main temple features a Kashmiri-style cusped archway

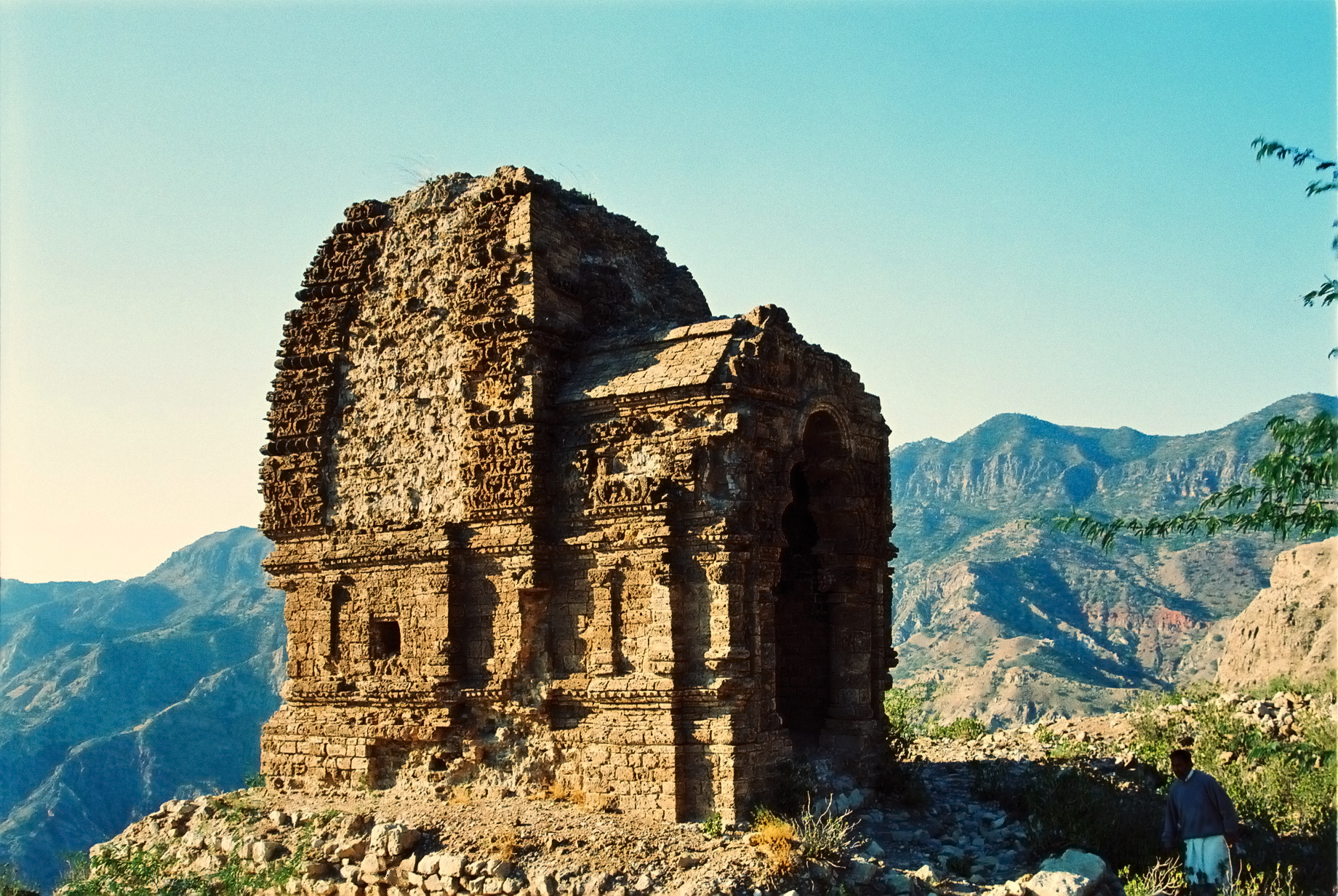
A view of the smaller temple with its vestibule chamber

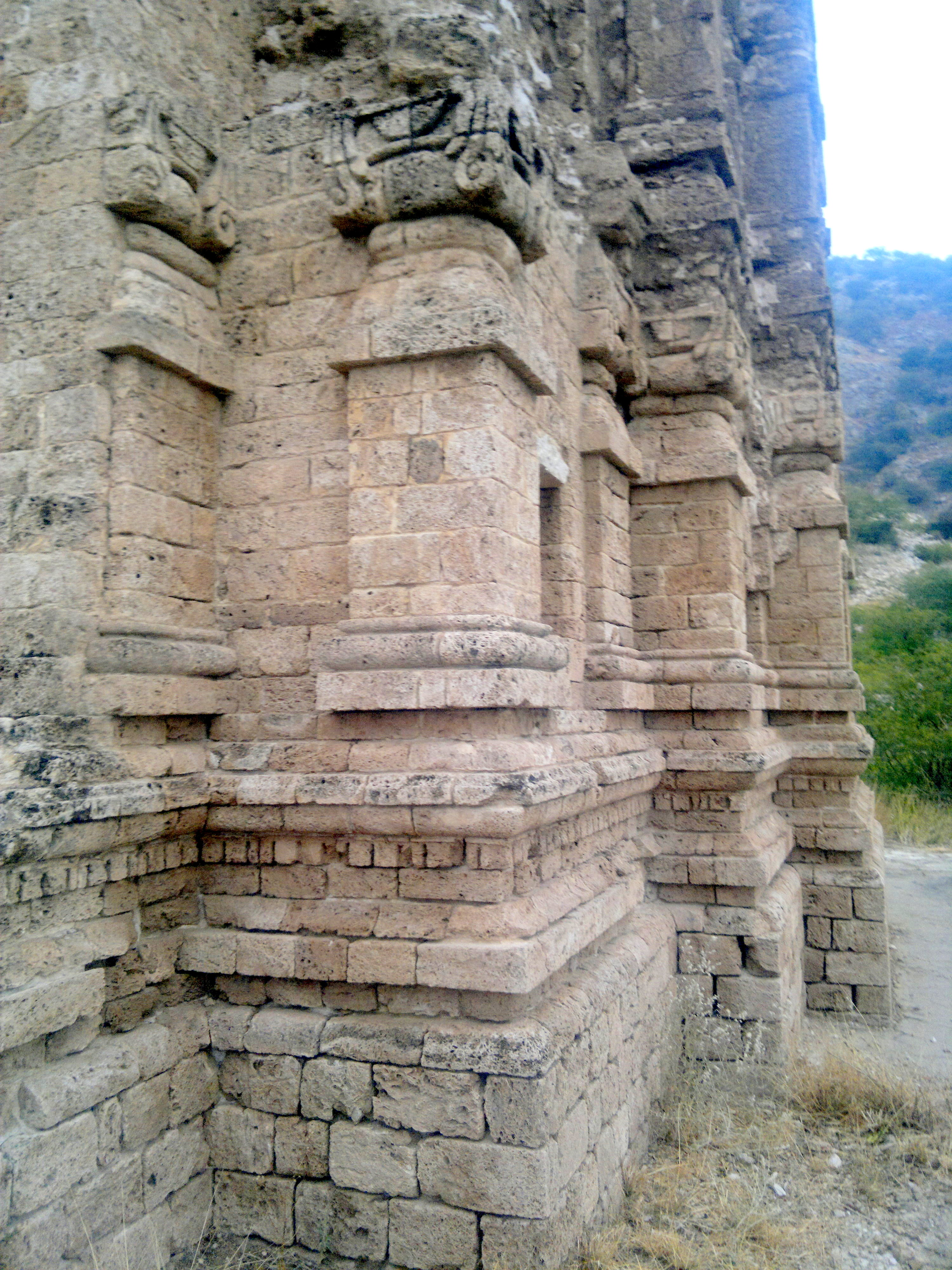
The base of the main temple

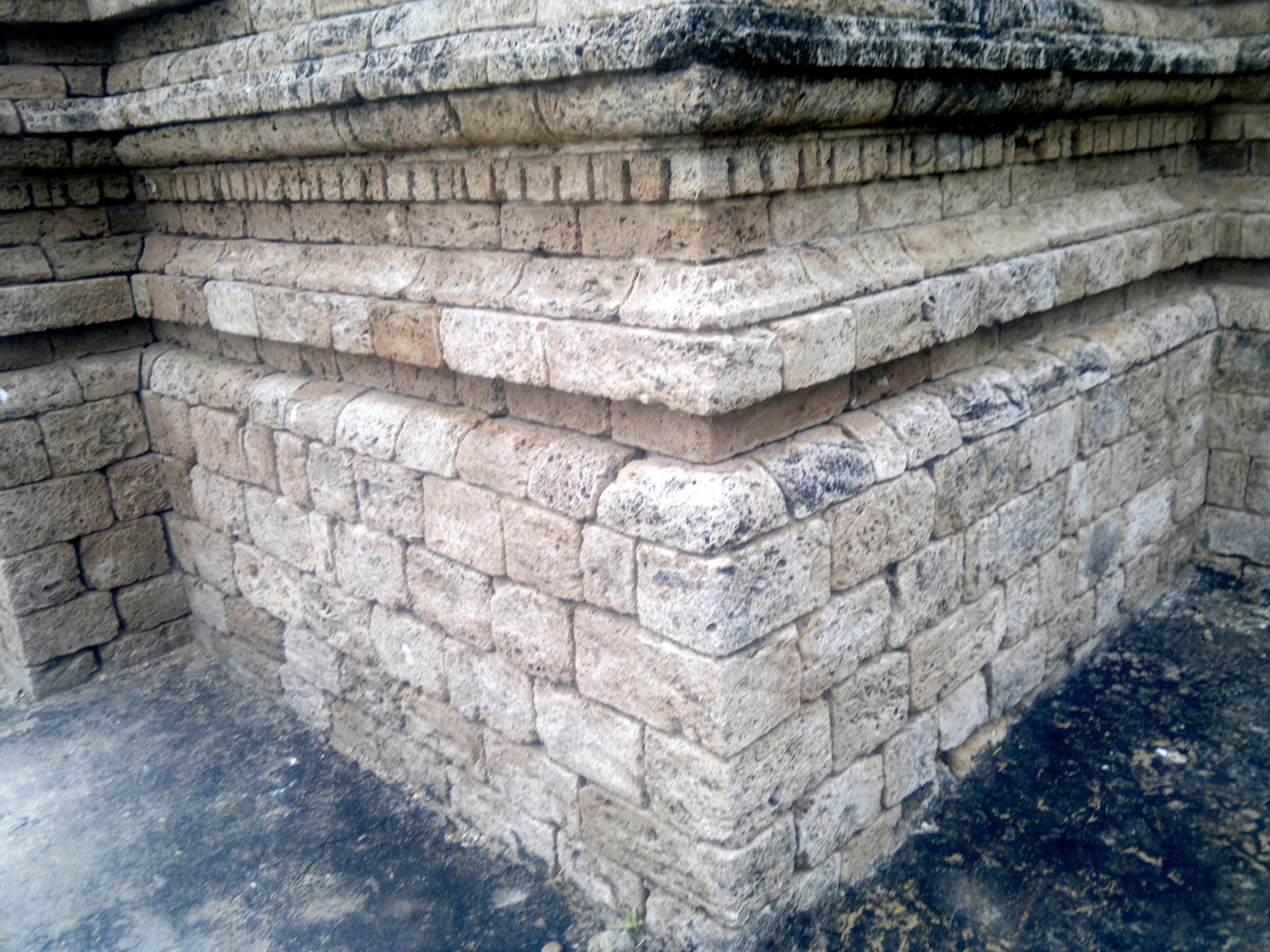
A view of the main temple's plinth

== See also ==
- Hinglaj Mata
