= List of Ramsar sites in Pakistan =

The Ramsar Convention on wetland protection was signed in Ramsar, Iran in 1971. Pakistan joined the convention on 23 November 1976.

As of March 2013, there are nineteen Ramsar sites, covering an area of 1,343,807 hectares (3,320,620 acres) in Pakistan. Out of these, there are nine sites which lie in Sindh province, four in Balochistan, three in Punjab, two in Khyber Pakhtunkhwa and the remaining one covers an area in both Sindh and Balochistan provinces of the country.

== Ramsar Convention wetland sites ==
The following is a list of sites in Pakistan protected under this treaty:

Site no.	Name	Designation date	Area	Location	Image	Description
1,063	Astola Island	10 May 2001	5,000 hectares (12,000 acres)	Gwadar District, Balochistan		
816	Chashma Barrage	22 March 1996	34,099 hectares (84,260 acres)	Mianwali District, Punjab		
1,283	Deh Akro-II Desert Wetland Complex	5 November 2002	20,500 hectares (51,000 acres)	Shaheed Benazirabad District, Sindh		
100	Drigh Lake	23 July 1976	164 hectares (410 acres)	Qambar Shahdadkot District, Sindh		
101	Haleji Lake	23 July 1976	1,704 hectares (4,210 acres)	Thatta District, Sindh		
1,064	Hub Dam	10 May 2001	27,000 hectares (67,000 acres)	Karachi District and Hub District of Sindh and Balochistan respectively		
1,284	Indus Delta	5 November 2002	472,800 hectares (1,168,000 acres)	Sindh		
1,065	Indus Dolphin Reserve	10 May 2001	125,000 hectares (310,000 acres)	Sindh		
1,066	Jiwani Coastal Wetland	10 May 2001	4,600 hectares (11,000 acres)	Balochistan		
1,067	Jubho Lagoon	10 May 2001	706 hectares (1,740 acres)	Sujawal District, Sindh		
99	Kinjhar Lake	23 July 1976	13,468 hectares (33,280 acres)	Thatta District, Sindh		
1,068	Miani Hor	10 May 2001	55,000 hectares (140,000 acres)	Lasbela District, Balochistan		
1,069	Nurri Lagoon	10 May 2001	2,540 hectares (6,300 acres)	Badin District, Sindh		
1,070	Ormara Turtle Beaches	10 May 2001	2,400 hectares (5,900 acres)	Makran District, Balochistan		
1,285	Runn of Kutch	5 November 2002	566,375 hectares (1,399,540 acres)	Badin District, Sindh		
98	Tanda Dam	23 July 1976	405 hectares (1,000 acres)	Kohat District, Khyber Pakhtunkhwa		Migratory birds from Caspian and Siberia stay here in winters.
817	Taunsa Barrage	22 March 1996	6,756 hectares (16,690 acres)	Muzaffargarh District, Punjab		
97	Thanedar Wala Game Reserve	23 July 1976	4,047 hectares (10,000 acres)	Bannu District, Khyber Pakhtunkhwa		Wetland bird migration route
818	Uchhali Complex	22 March 1996	1,243 hectares (3,070 acres)	Khushab District, Punjab		Complex of three saline lakes. Hosts the winter migratory flocks of White-headed duck. Other migratory species here include Greater flamingo, pied harrier, greylag goose and ferruginous duck.

== See also ==
- List of Ramsar sites worldwide
- Protected areas in Pakistan
