= Uchhali Complex =

Complex of three lakes in Punjab, Pakistan

Uchali Complex
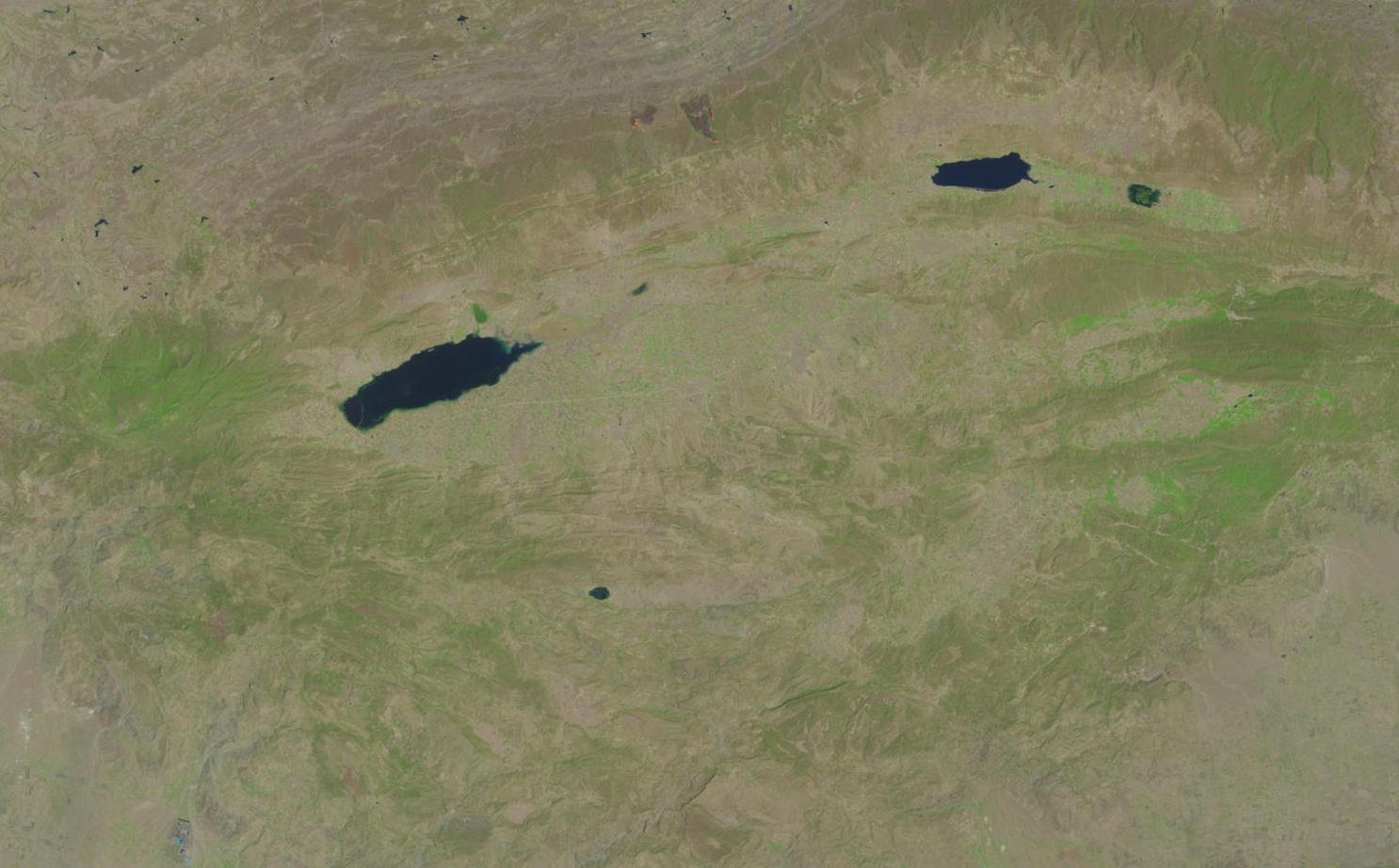
- Landsat 8 image of the Uchhali Wetlands Complex in 2016

- Location within Pakistan
- Interactive map of Uchali Complex
- Coordinates: 32°37′N 72°00′E
- Type: Wetland
- Basin countries: Pakistan
- Surface area: 1,243 ha (3,070 acres)
- Settlements: Khushab

Ramsar Wetland
- Designated: 22 March 1996
- Reference no.: 818

Uchhali Complex is a wetland complex located in Khushab District in Punjab, Pakistan. The complex lies in the Soon Valley of the Salt Range and includes three brackish to saline lakes namely Khabikki Lake, Uchhali Lake and Jahlar Lake. It was designated a Ramsar site in 1996.

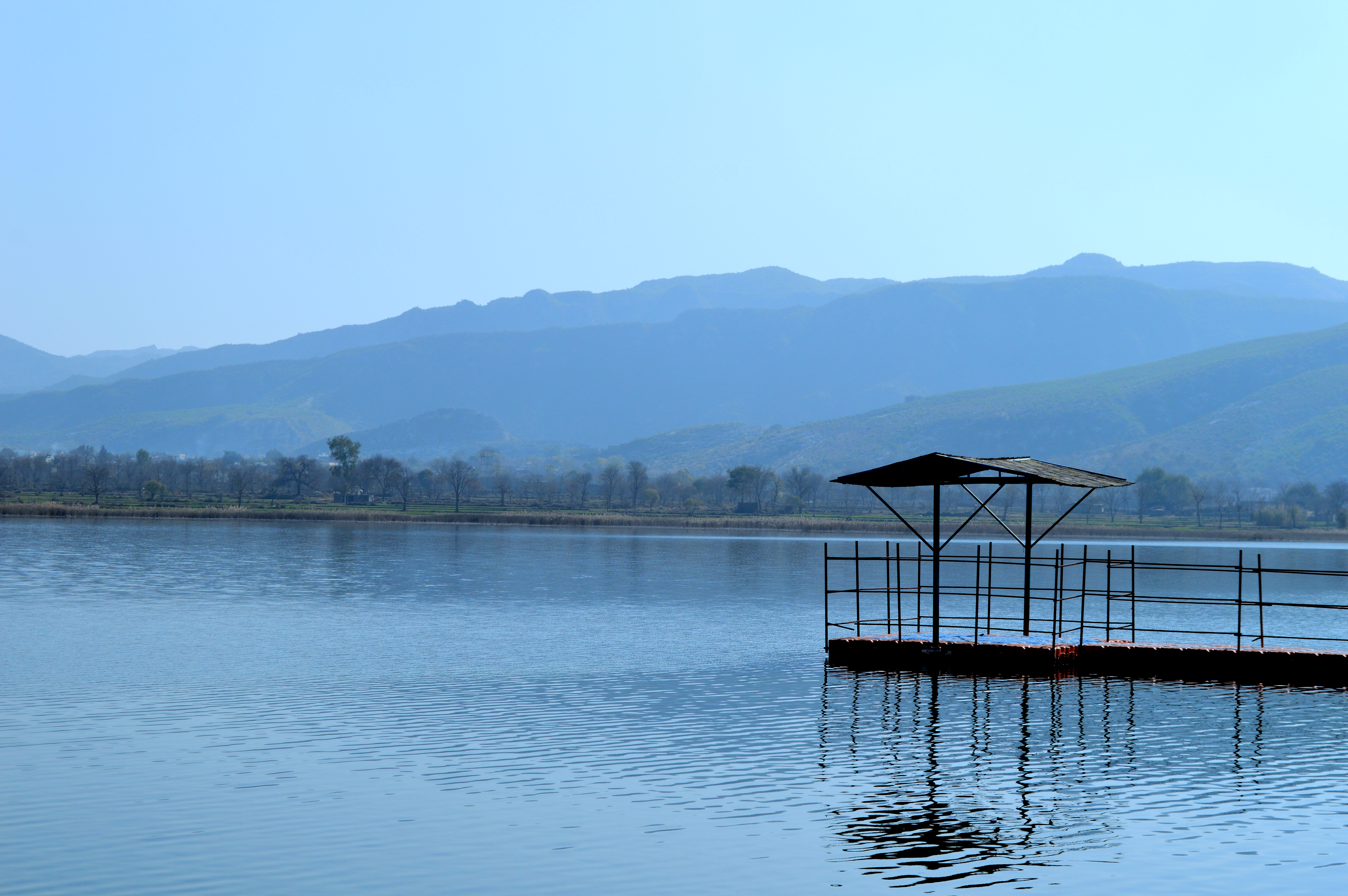
Uchali Lake, the largest of the three lakes of the complex

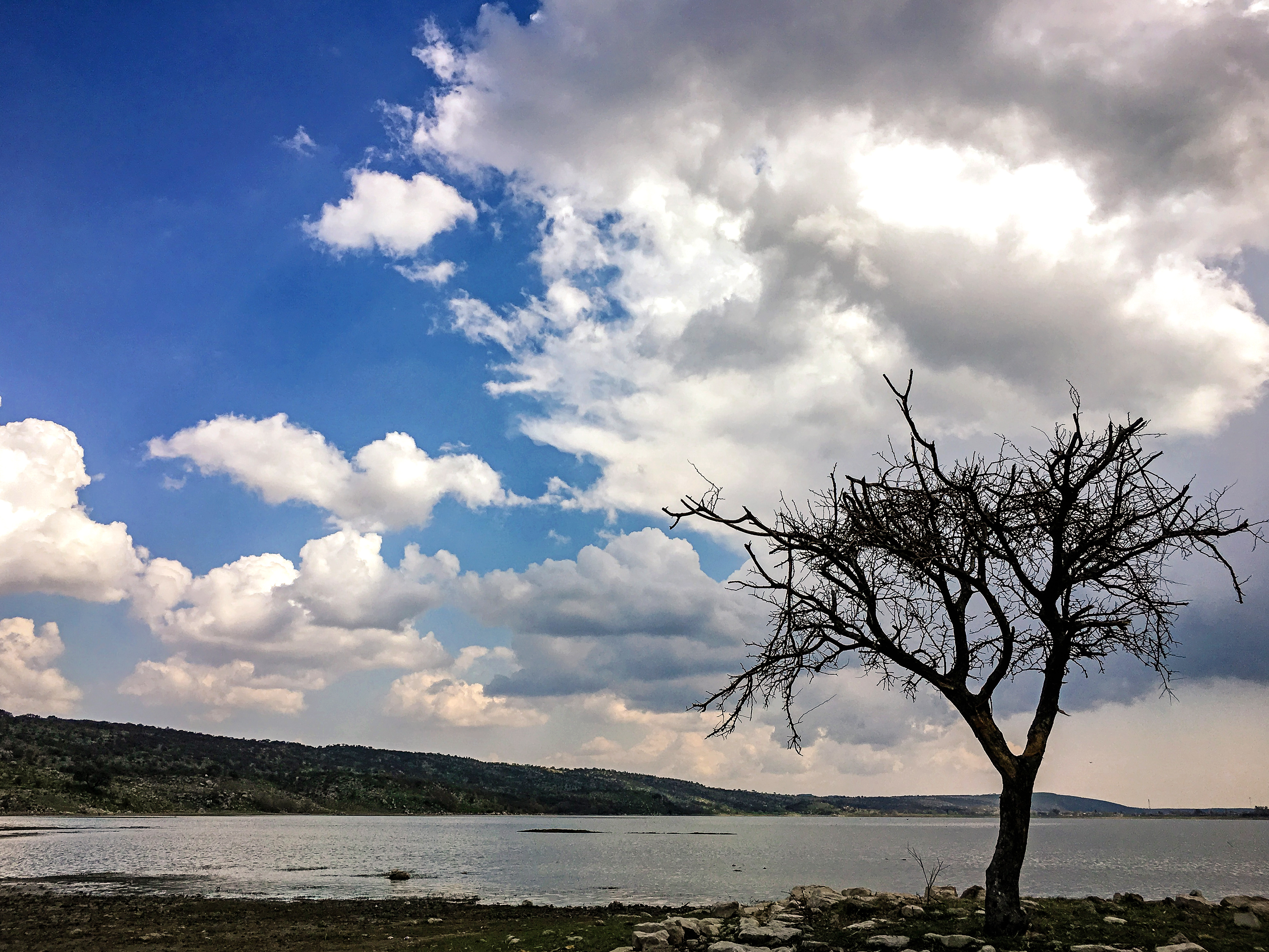
Khabikki Lake, another saltwater lake of the complex

== Fauna ==
Ucchali Complex is the only conservation supporting the winter migratory flocks of White-headed duck in Pakistan. The complex is also home to three other species; Cinereous vulture, Eastern imperial eagle and sociable lapwing. Other migratory species in the wetlands include: greater flamingo, pied harrier, greylag goose and ferruginous duck.

== See also ==
- List of Ramsar sites in Pakistan
