= Lohi Bher Wildlife Park =

Wildlife Park In Rawalpindi

- پارک حیات وحش لوہی بھیر
- Interactive map of Lohi Bher Wildlife Park
- 33.577°N 73.127°E
- Date opened: 1992
- Location: Lohi Bher, Rawalpindi, Punjab, Pakistan
- Land area: 2.78 square kilometres
- Owner: Forestry, Wildlife & Fisheries Department
- Website: fwf.punjab.gov.pk/Zoos

Lohi Bher Wildlife Park is a zoo located near Lohi Bher in Rawalpindi, Punjab, Pakistan. Established in 1992, the area encompasses 2.78 square kilometres (687 acres). It was established and is administered by the Forestry, Wildlife & Fisheries Department of the Government of Punjab.

== History ==
The plan to set up a park in the area was formed in 1988. At the time of its opening in 1992, it spanned an area of 4.2 square kilometres (1,050 acres). In the years since, the forest area has continued to decrease due to being reassigned for real estate development, while illegal encroachments have also caused several acres to be occupied.

In 2008, the government decided to renovate the park and introduce new animals into it to bring the park up to international safari standards. A Rs. 311 million budget was allocated for this purpose. Developments were to include purchase of an additional 100 acres of land to expand the park, and the construction of a pheasant reserve and two artificial lakes.

Around the late 2000s and 2010s, the park used to see 400 to 500 visitors on weekends.

In July 2019, another plan to restore the park was made by the administration, as it had undergone a state of disrepair owing to negligence.

== See also ==
- List of zoos in Pakistan
- List of wildlife sanctuaries in Pakistan
- List of parks and gardens in Pakistan
