= Tulaja Fort =

Tulaja Fort تلاجہ قلعہ

General information
- Location: Soon Valley, Punjab, Pakistan
- Coordinates: 32°27′59″N 72°13′47″E
- Completed: Anno Domini
- Owner: Tourism Development Corporation of Punjab

Tulaja Fort (Urdu: تلاجہ قلعہ) is a ruined fort in Soon Valley, Punjab, Pakistan.

== History ==
According to local sources, Tulaja Fort was founded five thousand years ago and was then named Til An Ja. The entrance to the fort was located in a cave. Only through the tunnel could the fort be accessed, as it was surrounded by large stones. The area used to receive water from the neighbouring creek.

In October 2021, a team of researchers found that the site is two thousand years old.

It is under the administration of the Tourism Development Corporation of Punjab, a department of the Government of Punjab, Pakistan.
