= Lohi Bher =

Coordinates: 33°35′N 73°10′E

Lohi Bher Awan Islamabad
- Village
- Location within Pakistan
- Country: Pakistan
- Region: Islamabad Capital Territory
- District: Islamabad

Government
  - Chairman Union Council: currently no one
- Time zone: UTC+5 (PST)
- Calling code: 051-57

Lohi Bher is a populated area situated in the city of Islamabad, Pakistan. It constitutes one of the union councils within the city and falls under Union Council No. 34, following the latest district boundary updates of 2022. This union council encompasses a range of residential regions, such as Coring Town, Pakistan Town, Lohi Bher, Hussainabad, Dhok Baba Badu, and Jinnah Garden.

Lohi Bher Awan village accommodates a significant population and is notably recognized for its Lohi Bher Wildlife Park, which draws numerous visitors from different parts of the country. The majority of the village inhabitants belong to the Awan community, specifically the Awan-Qutab Shahi sub-clan. With a history that spans over two centuries, Lohi Bher Awan is one of the most prominent villages in the Islamabad area, renowned for its vast expanse and varied housing societies, including PWD, Pakistan Town, Jinnah Garden, Capital Enclave, and Soan Garden, among others. It is noteworthy that Lohi Bher Awan is located adjacent to the PWD Housing Society.
