= List of game reserves of Pakistan =

There are at least 66 game reserves in Pakistan.

== List of game reserves ==
- Abbasia
- Askor Nallah
- Bahawalpur Plantation
- Bhon Fazil
- Bhono
- Bilyamin
- Bund Khush Dil Khan
- Chassi/Baushdar
- Chashma Barrage
- Chaupalia
- Cholistan
- Danyor Nallah
- Darosh Gol
- Daulana
- Deh Jangisar
- Deh Sahib Saman
- Diljabba-Domeli
- Dosu Forest
- Gat Wala
- Gehrait Gol
- Ghamot
- Gogi
- Goleen Gol
- Head Qadirabad
- Jabbar
- Kala Chitta
- Kathar
- Kazinag
- Khari Murat
- Khipro
- Kilik/Mintaka
- Killan
- Kot Zabzai
- Makhnial
- Mando Dero
- Mang
- Mirpur Sakro
- Moji
- Mori Said Ali
- Nar/Ghoro Nallah
- Nara
- Nazbar
- Nizampur
- Pai
- Pakora
- Parit Gol/Ghinar Gol
- Qazi Nag
- Rahri Bungalow
- Resi
- Sher Qillah
- Surjan, Sumbak, Eri and Hothiano
- Swegali
- Tando Mitha Khan
- Tangir
- Teri/Isak Khumari
- Thal
- Thanedar Wala
- Totali
- Vatala
- Wam
- Zangi Nawar
- Zawarkhan

== See also ==
- Wildlife of Pakistan
- Protected areas of Pakistan
- Environmental issues in Pakistan
