= Uchhali Lake =

- اوچھالی (Urdu)
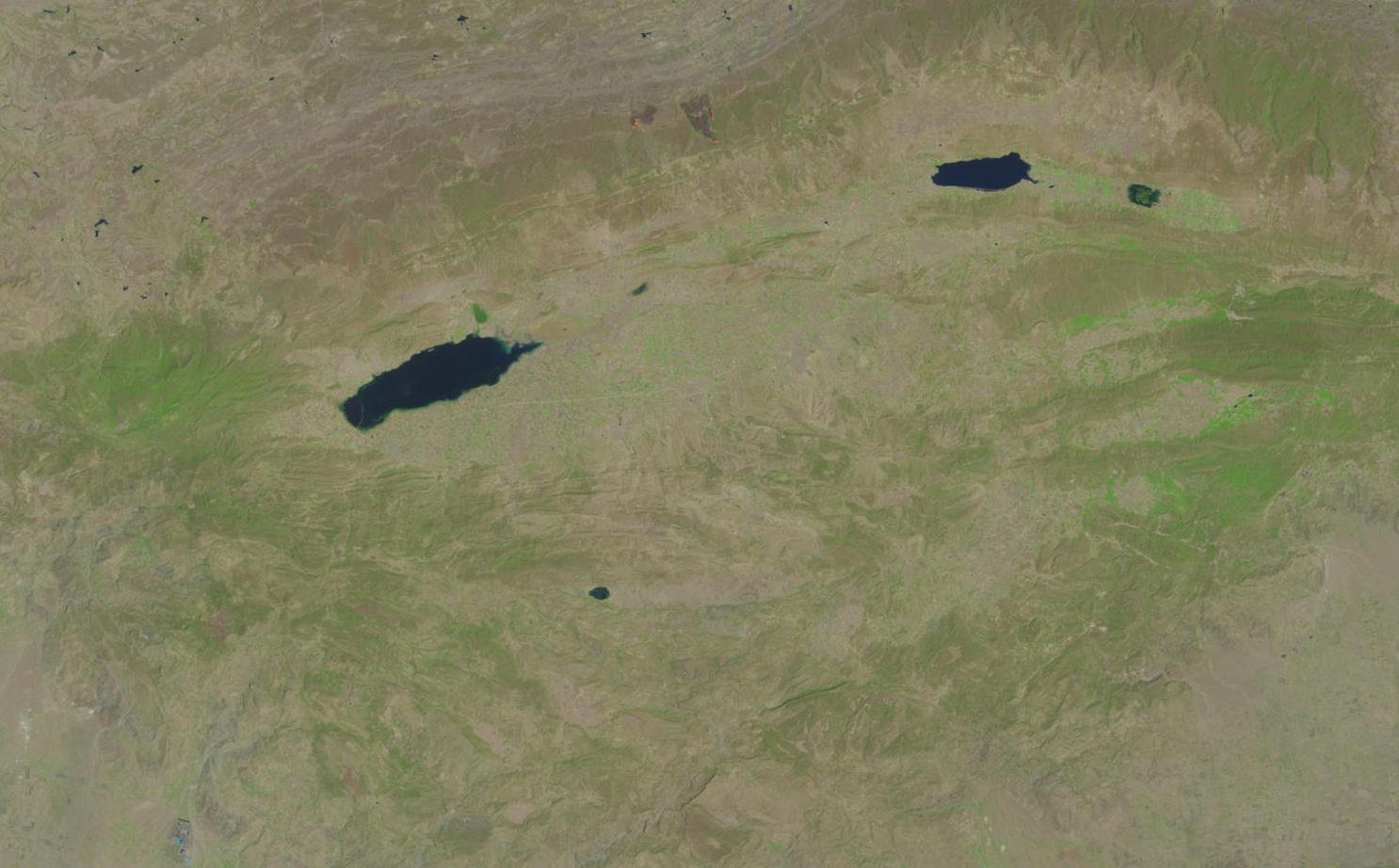
- LandsatLook image of Uchhali Lake

- Uchaali Lake is in Soon Valley, Salt Range
- Coordinates: 32.56°N 72.02°E
- Type: Salt lake
- Basin countries: Pakistan
- Surface area: 943 hectares (9.43 km^{2})

Ramsar Wetland
- Designated: 22 March 1996

Uchhali (Urdu: اوچھالی) is a saltwater lake in Soan Sakaser Valley in the southern Salt Range area in the province of Punjab, Pakistan. This lake is formed due to the absence of drainage in the range.

Sakaser, the highest mountain in the Salt Range at 1525 meters, looms over the lake.

Due to its saline water, the lake does not support marine life.

The lake is part of the Uchhali Complex, which also includes two other brackish to saline lakes: Khabikki Lake, and Jahlar Lake. The Uchhali Complex was designated a Ramsar site on March 22, 1996.

== See also ==
- Khabikki Lake
- Uchhali Complex
