= Sakesar =

Mountain in Pakistan

Sakesar سكيسر
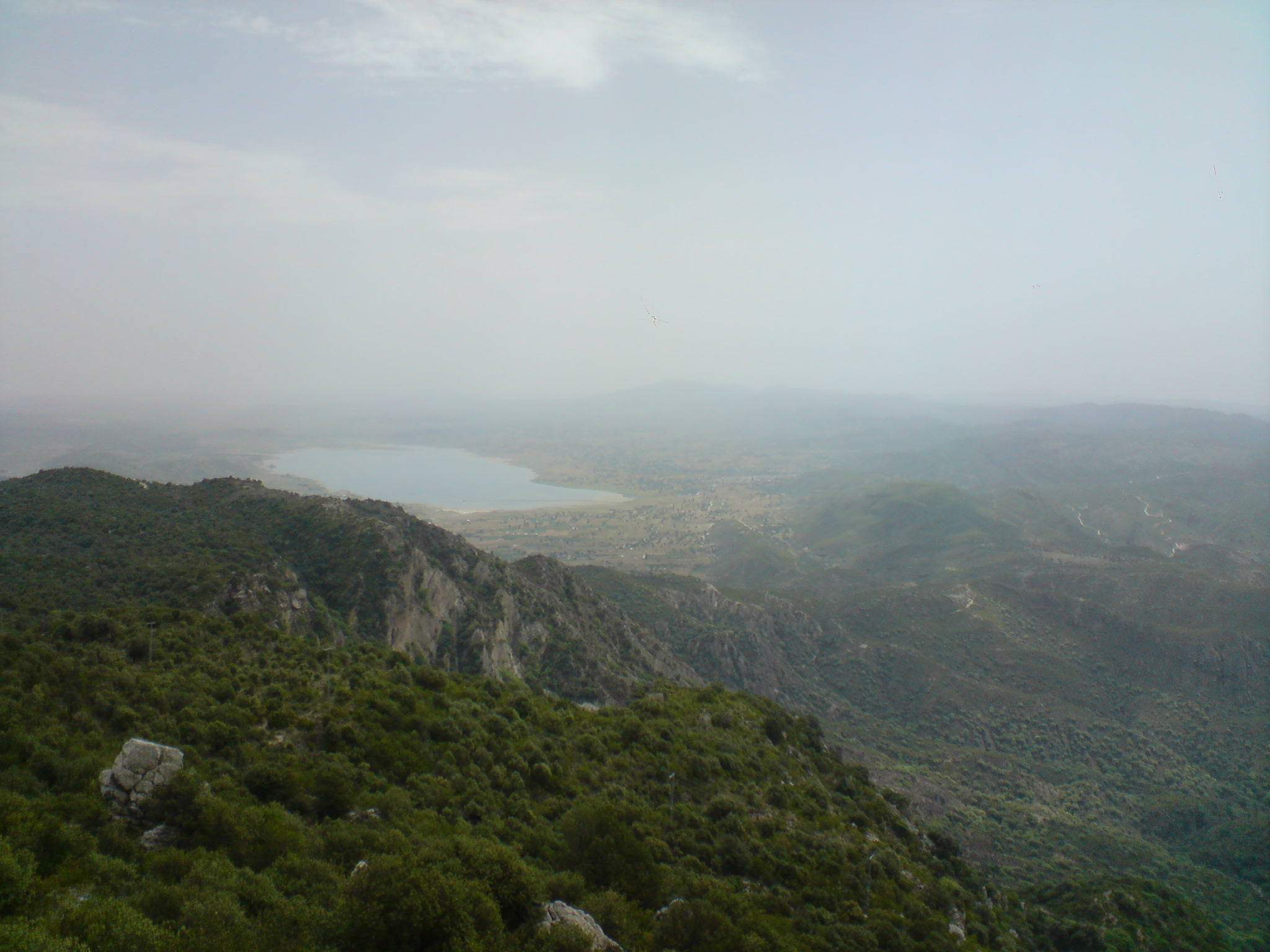
- Sakesar with Uchalli Lake in the background

Highest point
- Elevation: 1,525 m (5,003 ft)

Geography
- Location: Soon Valley, Punjab, Pakistan
- Parent range: Salt Range

Geology
- Mountain type: Hill

Sakesar (Punjabi, Urdu: سكيسر) is the highest mountain in the Salt Range in Punjab, Pakistan. Its height is 1,525 metres (5,003 ft). It lies on the outer fringes of the Soon Valley in Khushab District in the Punjab province. The small village of Sakesar is named after the mountain and Uchhali Lake is just below it.

== History ==
The mountain used to be the summer headquarters for the deputy commissioners of three districts: Campbellpur (now Attock), Mianwali, and Sargodha.

The Pakistan Air Force selected it in the late 1950s as the site for a high-powered radar which would provide air defence cover for the northeastern part of the western wing. The hilltop of Sakesar is located in the Salt Range, starting from Sohawa (in Jhelum District) in the east and spreading westward.

== Lakes ==
- Khabikki Lake – 37 km
- Uchhali Lake – 13 km respectively, boating available
- Nammal Lake – 40 km north-northwest of Sakesar
- Jahlar Lake – 148 acres

== Wildlife ==
A World Wide Fund for Nature survey carried out in September 2001 noted over 60 species of birds (some of them rare ones) and 10 species of mammals in and around Sakesar.

== Climate ==
- May–June Summers Min 15 to 22 °C; Max 28 to 38 °C
- Nov–Feb winters Min –3 to –4 °C; Max 6 to 22 °C
- July-Aug Rainy Season

== Amb Shareef Hindu temple ==
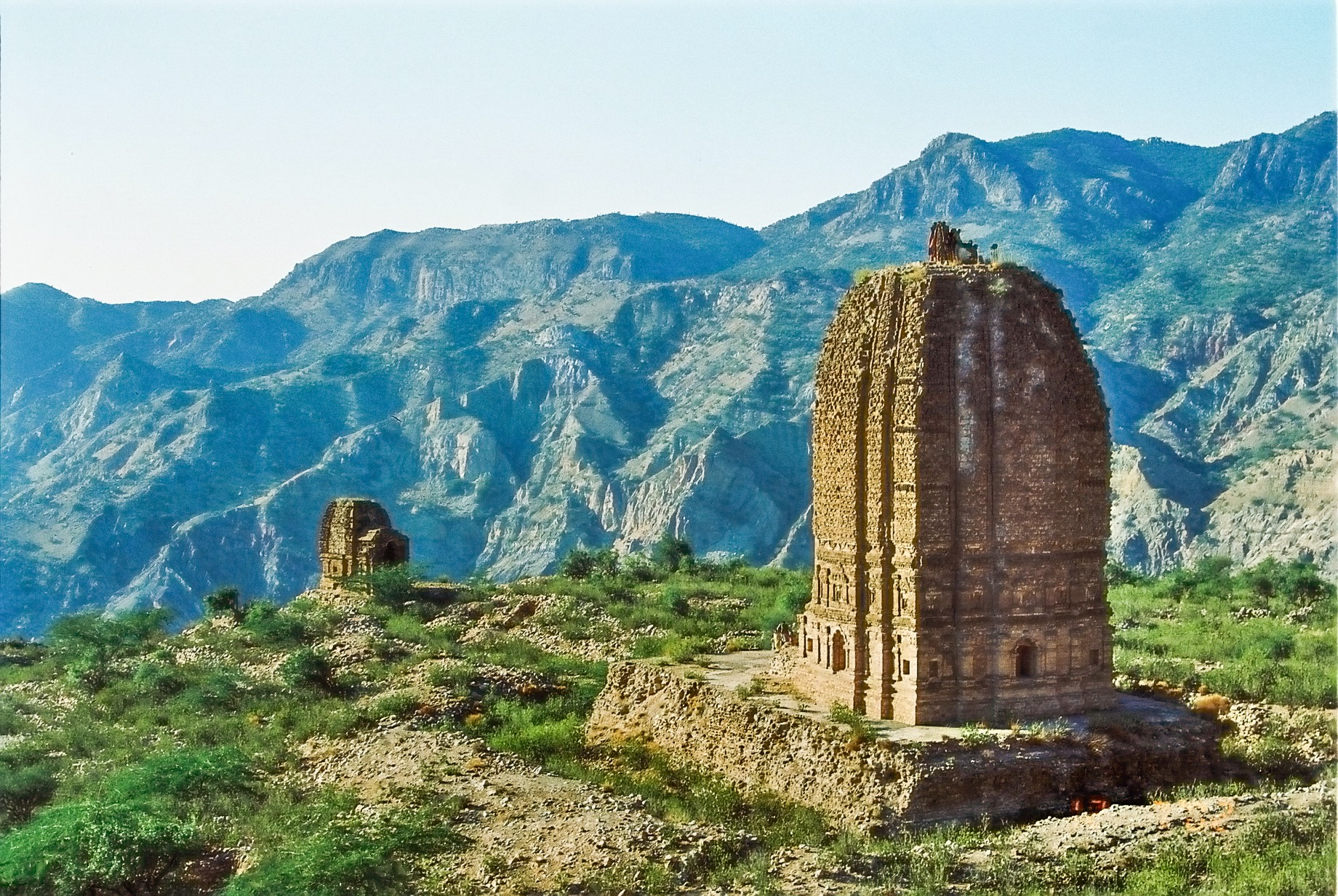
The Amb Temples date from the 7th to 9th centuries CE

A pre-Islamic Hindu temple is located on Sakesar near the Amb Shareef village. The temple complex, built in brick and mortar, consists of two temples facing each other. The main temple has several storeys, roughly 15 to 20 meters high. About 75 meters to the west is a smaller temple, which is two storeys or 7 to 8 meters high.

=== PTV re-broadcasting station ===
Pakistan Television's re-broadcasting centre is located in the area to provide terrestrial transmissions coverage to adjoining areas.
