= Punjab Wildlife & Parks Department =

Wildlife management authority in Punjab, Pakistan

Punjab Wildlife and Parks Department
- محکمہ جنگلی حیات و پارکس پنجاب

Agency overview
- Jurisdiction: Government of Punjab, Pakistan
- Headquarters: 2 Sanda Road, Lahore
- Agency executive: Director General (Wildlife and Parks)
- Parent department: Forestry, Wildlife and Fisheries department, Punjab
- Website: pwl.gop.pk

The Punjab Wildlife & Parks Department (Punjabi: محکمہ جنگلی حیات و پارکس پنجاب) is the provincial agency responsible for the protection, conservation, and management of wildlife and protected areas in the Punjab province of Pakistan. The department oversees wildlife conservation, habitat restoration, captive breeding, enforcement of wildlife laws, and operation of zoos, safari parks, sanctuaries, and public wildlife reserves under the Forestry, Wildlife & Fisheries Department.

== History ==
Punjab's organised wildlife administration dates back to the Game Department established in 1934, which regulated hunting licences and game reserves during the British period. Following the abolition of princely states and integration into the provincial administrative system, the department evolved into the Wildlife & Parks Department in 1973, marking a shift from sport hunting to conservation-oriented management.

The department's modern legal foundation was established under the Punjab Wildlife (Protection, Preservation, Conservation and Management) Act, 1974, which remains in force with subsequent amendments. The law defined classes of protected areas, empowered government officers to regulate hunting and possession, and introduced schedules for protected species. Its implementation coincided with the creation of the first wildlife sanctuaries and national parks in Punjab.

== Legal framework ==
The department operates under two core provincial statutes: The Punjab Wildlife Act, 1974, which governs hunting, captive keeping, wildlife trade, and licensing; and the Punjab Protected Areas Act, 2020, which provides a framework for establishing and managing national parks, sanctuaries, game reserves, and public wildlife reserves under management plans approved by the government.

Together, these statutes empower the department to declare protected areas by gazette notification, appoint management authorities, and regulate permissible uses within such areas. Under the 2020 law, management boards are tasked with approving plans for conservation, visitor management, and community engagement. In 2023, the Punjab Rangers were formally designated as the management authority for the Border Belt Public Wildlife Reserve, representing a significant step towards collaborative security–conservation management.

A comprehensive amendment bill introduced in 2025 proposes updated definitions, higher penalties, and harmonisation with the 2020 Act, ensuring consistency between wildlife protection and protected-area governance.

== Functions ==
The department's functions encompass wildlife conservation, law enforcement, research, captive breeding, rescue and rehabilitation, and public education. Its operations include habitat management, monitoring of migratory and resident species, control of poaching, and development of eco-tourism initiatives in coordination with district administrations and community organisations.

Through the Wildlife PASS digital licensing system launched in 2024, hunting and possession licences can be renewed online, improving transparency and compliance. By late 2024, more than 2,000 licences had been issued through the platform.

The department also conducts anti-poaching operations, confiscations, and prosecutions. In 2025, multiple crackdowns targeted illegal wildlife trafficking and big-cat ownership, leading to arrests and seizures across Lahore, Multan, and Bahawalpur.

== Organisation ==
The head office of the department is located in Lahore, and operates under the administrative control of the Secretary, Forestry, Wildlife & Fisheries Department. Field divisions are distributed across Punjab's districts, each supervised by Deputy and Assistant Directors (Wildlife).

== Subordinate institutions ==
=== Zoos, safari and wildlife parks ===
- Lahore Zoo Safari (Raiwind Road) – the department's flagship safari zoo complex featuring open enclosures, breeding units, and an aquarium under development.
- Jallo Wildlife Park – a 837-acre recreational park featuring aviaries, deer enclosures, and education facilities.
- Changa Manga Forest and Wildlife Park – one of the world's oldest hand-planted forests, incorporating a 40-acre wildlife park with eco-tourism amenities.
- Bansra Gali Wildlife Park – a hill park near Murree hosting Himalayan fauna.
- Lohi Bher Wildlife Park – suburban wildlife park in Rawalpindi serving conservation and recreation functions.

=== Breeding centres ===
Wildlife breeding centres (Punjab Wildlife & Parks Department)
Centre	District	Area (acres)
Bhagat Breeding Centre	Toba Tek Singh	15
Changa Manga Breeding Centre	Kasur	40
Fatehpur Breeding Centre	Layyah	12.5
Gatwala Breeding Centre	Faisalabad	25
Jallo Breeding Centre	Lahore	43
Jhang Breeding Centre	Jhang	25
Jauharabad Breeding Centre	Khushab	58
Kamalia Breeding Centre	Toba Tek Singh	15
Mini Zoo (breeding)	Bhakkar	15
Pirowal Breeding Centre	Khanewal	42
Pirowal Breeding Estate	Khanewal (Pirowal)	1,024
Rahim Yar Khan Breeding Centre	Rahim Yar Khan	15
Sulemanki Breeding Centre	Okara	29

=== Wildlife sanctuaries ===
Notified wildlife sanctuaries (selection)
Sanctuary	District(s)	Area (acres)
Great Indian Bustard Sanctuary	Bahawalpur	168
Jalalpur Sharif	Jhelum	5,591
Chumbi Surla	Chakwal; Jhelum	12,180
Sodhi	Khushab	14,375
Khanpur	Muzaffargarh	31,555
Rakh & Jhang Branch Canal’s Bank	Hafizabad	1,759.86
Qadirabad Link Canal Bank	Hafizabad	3,998.87
Amb	Khushab	8,003
Noorpur	Chakwal	15,190
Dalwal Reserve Forest	Chakwal	10,009
Head Marala	Sialkot	1,576
Taunsa Barrage	Muzaffargarh; Dera Ghazi Khan; Layyah	61,635

=== Public wildlife reserves ===
Public Wildlife Reserves (selection)
Public Wildlife Reserve	District(s)	Area (acres)
Cholistan PWR	Bahawalpur; Bahawalnagar; Rahim Yar Khan	18,827
Abbasia PWR	Rahim Yar Khan	24,874
Thal PWR	Muzaffargarh; Jhang; Khushab; Layyah; Bhakkar; Mianwali	10,000
Kundian PWR	Mianwali	19,274
Bajwat PWR	Sialkot	14,319
Daphar PWR	Mandi Bahauddin	7,126
Head Qadirabad PWR	Gujranwala	5,654
Rasool Barrage PWR	Mandi Bahauddin; Jhelum	2,812
Chichawatni PWR	Sahiwal	11,531.7
Kamalia PWR	Toba Tek Singh	10,866
Pirowal PWR	Khanewal	4,896

=== Wildlife wetlands ===
Notified wildlife wetlands
Wetland	District	Area (acres)
Namal Lake Wildlife Wetland	Mianwali	13,136.06

== Enforcement and prosecutions ==
Wildlife protection in Punjab is enforced through powers granted under the 1974 Act, enabling officers to conduct searches, inspections, and seizures of illegally kept wildlife or hunting gear. Violations can result in imprisonment, fines, or both. Repeat offenders may face licence cancellations and disqualification from future permissions. Enforcement teams also undertake routine patrols in collaboration with law enforcement agencies and the Punjab Rangers.

== See also ==
- Forestry, Wildlife and Fisheries department
- Wildlife of Pakistan
- National parks of Pakistan
