= Soon Valley =

Valley in Punjab, Pakistan

- Soon Sakesar Valley وادیِ سُون سکیسر
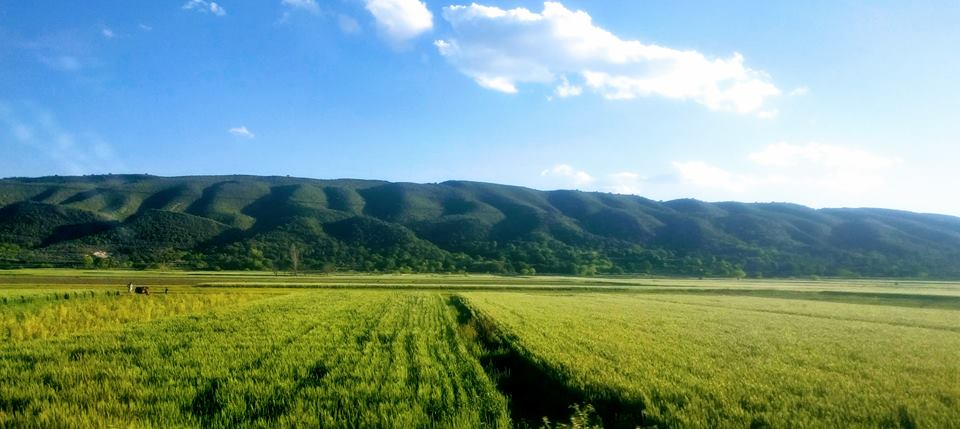
- Floor elevation: 1,530 m (5,020 ft)
- Length: 35 mi (56 km)
- Width: 9 mi (14 km)

Naming
- Native name: وادیِ سُون (Urdu)

Geography
- Location: Location in Pakistan
- Country: Pakistan
- State/Province: Punjab
- District: Khushab
- Coordinates: 32°58′N 72°15′E
- Interactive map of Soon Valley

The Soon Valley (Punjabi, Urdu: وادیِ سُون), also known as Soon Sakesar Valley, is in the north west of Khushab District of Punjab, Pakistan. Its largest settlement is the town of Naushera. The valley extends from the village of Padhrar to Sakesar, the highest peak in the Salt Range. The valley is 56 kilometres (35 mi) long and has an average width of 14 kilometres (9 mi). It covers a 800-square-kilometre (310 sq mi) area. Soon Valley has a number of lakes, waterfalls, jungle, natural pools and ponds. The valley has been settled since ancient times, most recently by the Awan tribe, which still resides in the valley.

The peak of Mount Sakesar is at 1,530 metres (5,010 ft) above sea level. It was once the summer headquarters of the Deputy Commissioners of three districts – Campbellpur (now Attock), Mianwali and Shahpur (now Sargodha). It is the only mountain in this part of the Punjab which receives snowfall in winter. In the late 1950s, the Pakistan Air Force placed PAF Base Sakesar, a radar station on Sakesar to monitor airspace over north-eastern Pakistan. Also on the mountain is a Pakistan Television Corporation transmission center.

== Geography ==
=== Location ===
- Distance from Islamabad: 230 km
- Distance from Sargodha: 120 km
- Distance from Lahore: 320 km
- Distance from Karachi: 1262 km

== History and Demography ==
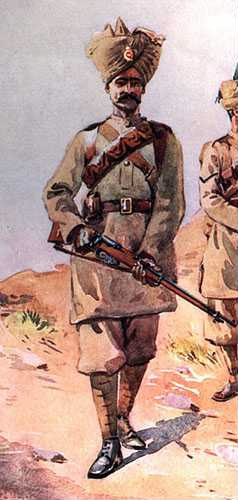
Awan Sepoy of Indian British Army

In 997 CE, Sultan Mahmud Ghaznavi, took over the Ghaznavid dynasty empire established by his father, Sultan Sebuktegin. In 1005 he conquered the Shahis in Kabul and followed it by conquests within the Punjab region. The Delhi Sultanate and later Mughal Empire ruled the region.

The Awans of the Soon Valley were also amongst those the British considered to be "martial race". The British recruited army heavily from Soon Valley for service in the colonial army, and as such, the Awans of this area also formed an important part of the British Indian Army, serving with distinction during World Wars I and II. All of the Muslim groups recruited by the British, proportionally, the Awans produced the greatest number of recruits during the First and Second World Wars. Contemporary historians Professor Ian Talbot and Professor Tan Tai Yong have asserted that the Awans (amongst other tribes) are viewed as a martial race by not only the British, but neighbouring tribes as well. Awans occupy the highest ranks of the Pakistani Army. A village by the name of Manawan (formerly Man Awan – The heart of the Awans) is also among the notable historical villages of the valley.

The agency Pakistan Poverty Alleviation Fund (PPAF) organized a report and initiated Soon Valley Development Program (SVDP) for agriculture, plantation, water system and dams.

== Gateway to Soon Sakesar ==
The Government of Punjab constructed the road from Nurewala to Naushera in recognition of services rendered by the Awans of Soon Valley during the First World War. Sir W.M. Hailey, the Governor of Punjab, formally opened the road on April 1, 1928 – as commemorated on plaques between Khushab and Sakesar as the road enters the hills.

== Culture ==
Many inhabitants of the valley descend from local tribes and classical culture and traditions are the norm. Practices include arranged marriages according to the traditions, where the wedding ceremony takes place at a mosque. The Nikah is attended by close family members, relatives, and friends of the bride and groom. Usually men and women participants at the wedding ceremony are separated, either sitting in separate rooms or with a purdah (curtain) separating them. Luddi is a folk dance for celebratory occasions, when the music is often played on the dhol drum and shehnai oboe.

== Lakes of Soon Valley ==
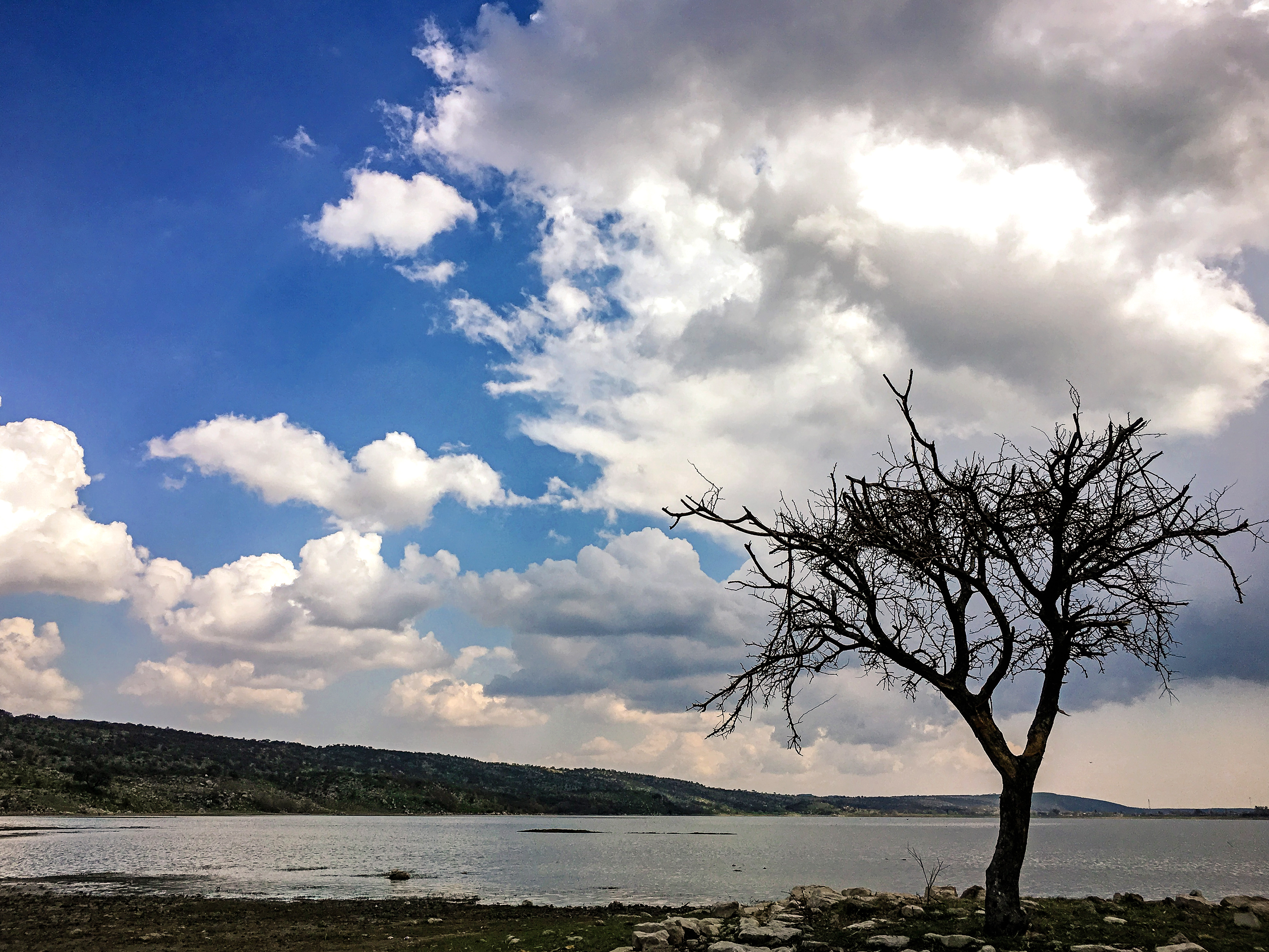
Khabikki Lake is located in this valley

Uchhali Lake is a picturesque salt water lake in the southern Salt Range overlooked by mount Sakaser, the highest mountain in the Salt Range. Its brackish water means that its waters are lifeless.Uchhali Lake is one of the few lakes where every year birds from Siberia, Mongolia and Central Asian countries reach the water of Uchhali Lake through snowy valleys and difficult areas and breed here. Khabikki Lake is also a salt water lake in the southern Salt Range. It is one kilometer wide and two kilometres long. Khabikki is also the name of a neighbouring village. These lakes attract thousands of migratory birds each year including rare white-headed ducks (Oxyura leucocephala) from Central Asia. Jahlar Lake is another serene lake in the valley, it is accessible from Naushera as well as from Sargodha. These three lakes are part of Ramsar Convention in Pakistan collectively known as Uchhali Complex.

== Historical places ==
- Akrand Cliff Fort or Fort of Janjua's (Road way & Tracking Way from Kanhati Garden).
- Waterfalls at Kufri.
- Amb Temples is a historical place in Hinduism.
- Kanahti Garden, Sodhi Garden, Sakesar and Daip Shareef and the hiking experiences of hills
- Angah, an important village.
- Sodhi village has waterfalls, a Rest House, and wild animals like Cheetah, Rabbit, Deer, Teetar (Urdu name of a bird).
- Koradhi is famous for its Historical Madrissa, where Qari Qamar Din used to teach.

=== Amb Temples ===
The ancient pre-Islamic ancient Hindu temple, is near the Amb Shareef village, on the Sakesar mountain in the Soon Valley. The temple complex, built in brick and mortar, is complex of two temples facing each other. The main temple is several story high, roughly 15 to 20 meter tall. To the west about 75 meters lies another smaller temple, which is 2 story or 7 to 8 meters high. It is located on the Sakesar mountain, near Amb Shareef village.

== See also ==
- Amb Temples
- Hinduism in Pakistan
- Rohtas Fort
- Rawat Fort
- Pharwala
- Sar Jalal
- Mankiala stupa
- Hinglaj Mata
- Kalat Kali Temple
- Malot
- Multan Sun Temple
- Prahladpuri Temple
- Nandana
- Sakesar
- Sadh Belo
- Tilla Jogian
- Khabikki Lake
- Namal Lake
- Swaik Lake
- Uchhali Lake
