= Baltistan Wildlife Sanctuary =

Wildlife sanctuary in Baltistan, Pakistan

- پناهگاه حیات وحش بلتستان
- IUCN category IV (habitat/species management area)
- Location within Pakistan
- Location: Skardu, Gilgit–Baltistan, Pakistan
- Coordinates: 35.602087°N 75.133038°E
- Area: 415 km^{2} (160 sq mi)
- Elevation: 2,400 m (7,900 ft)
- Established: 1975
- Governing body: Wildlife and Parks Department, Gilgit–Baltistan

Baltistan Wildlife Sanctuary is a wildlife sanctuary covering an area of 415 square kilometres (102,549 acres; 41,500 ha) in the Baltistan region of northern Pakistan. Contiguous with the Astore Wildlife Sanctuary to its south and east, the Baltistan Wildlife Sanctuary lies south of the Indus River, between the villages of Rondu and Shengus, in the Skardu District. This protected area was established in 1975, for the purpose of conserving the threatened species that occupy the park, and among them there are snow leopard, brown bear, lynx, Tibetan wolf, Tibetan sand fox, markhor, bharal, and Siberian ibex.
