= Rann of Kutch Wildlife Sanctuary =

Ramsar site in Sindh, Pakistan

Coordinates: 24°22′N 70°04′E

Designations

Ramsar Wetland
- Designated: 5 November 2002
- Reference no.: 1285

The Rann of Kutch Wildlife Sanctuary is the largest Ramsar site in Sindh, covering 566,375 ha (1,399,540 acres), and is located in the Rann of Kutch in Badin District, Sindh, Pakistan. In 1980, declared as a wildlife sanctuary by the Government of Sindh, the Rann of Kutch covers the most Ramsar site area as compared to that of any other of the ten Ramsar sites in Sindh province of Pakistan.

== Nature ==
The sanctuary is supporting a major ecosystem. It provides food and shelter to a number of migratory and local wildlife species. The marshy Rann of Kutch, with its surrounding Thar Desert area in Sindh, is one of the best potential habitats for a number of animals and birds in the province.

This area is known to be a breeding ground for flamingoes and staging ground for pelicans, cranes, storks and many species of waterfowl.

=== Fauna ===
Bird species such as common teal, shell duck, mallard, pochard, flamingo and pelican are found in the habitat. Occasionally, some other species have also been seen in the outskirts of the site. These include peafowl, sarus cranes, houbara bustard, the peregrine falcon and saker falcons.

The site supports many locally and globally threatened species, including the great Indian bustard, houbara bustard, sarus crane, and striped hyena and more than 1% of the biogeographical population of flamingos.

=== Flora ===
The flora consists of grasses and dry thorny scrub such as Apluda aristata, Dichanthium annulatum, Panicum antidotale, Cenchrus spp., Pennisetum spp., Cymbopogon spp. and Elionurus spp. Large trees include Prosopis juliflora, Prosopis cineraria, Caparis decidua, Ziziphus nummularia, Acacia senegal and Salvadora oleoides and are found in the desert area of kutch.

== Threats ==
Cattle grazing, tree cutting and vehicular traffic are the major threats to this ecoregion's habitat. The proposed expansion of commercial salt extraction operations will result in disturbances to wildlife, especially to the wild ass population and the bustards, flamingoes, and pelicans Despite the fact that areas in the Rann of Kutch remain largely intact, it is considered vulnerable to development activities such as construction and water diversion projects. Large portions of the Indus Delta have been destroyed as a result of logging for fuel wood and fodder, and grazing. Scarcity of water remains the most important potential threat to the ecosystem.

== Conservation ==
WWF-Pakistan and Sindh authorities have carried out work with GEF funding and a management plan is in preparation. This area used to have the only population of the Indian wild ass in Pakistan. Unfortunately they are thought to have been exterminated. In the past WWF-Pakistan through its Pakistan Wetlands Programme, has conducted baseline ecological studies and has been monitoring migratory waterfowls at Jubho Lagoon, Nurri lagoon and Runn of Kutch Ramsar sites.

== See also ==
- List of Ramsar wetland sites in Pakistan
