= Kheri Murat National Park =

National park in Pakistan

- IUCN category II (national park)
- Location within Punjab, Pakistan
- Location: Fateh Jang Tehsil, Attock District, Punjab, Pakistan
- Coordinates: 33.46627°N 72.80119°E
- Established: 30 September 2020
- Governing body: Punjab Wildlife and Parks Department

Kheri Murat National Park is a protected area in Fateh Jang Tehsil of Attock District, Punjab, Pakistan. It was declared a national park in 2020 with a follow-up notification issued in 2023. The park covers scrub-forest hills on the edge of the Kala Chitta Range near Fateh Jang and the M-1 motorway. It is managed by the Punjab Wildlife and Parks Department.

== Geography and boundaries ==
Departmental material describes the Kheri Murat Reserve Forest as a site of about 8,740 acres in Fateh Jang Tehsil with public access for nature recreation. The 2020 and 2023 gazette notifications refer to the broader Kheri Murat forests of Attock Forest Division in the legal declaration of the park. The site is also listed in the World Database on Protected Areas (WDPA; Protected Planet) with a mapped polygon and a reported area of 35.37 km².

== Flora and fauna ==
The national park lies within Subtropical thorn scrub forest typical of the Salt Range/Attock uplands. Vegetation surveys in the Kheri Murat/Khaira Murat landscape report assemblages including Acacia nilotica, Prosopis juliflora, Dodonaea viscosa, Adhatoda vasica and Olea ferruginea across elevation zones. Avifaunal survey work has documented resident and migratory birds in and around the park, underlining its role for local bird diversity. A provincial environment profile notes the presence of the Punjab urial (Ovis vignei punjabiensis) and highlights poaching pressure on partridges in the landscape.

== Visitor access and facilities ==
According to the managing authority, Kheri Murat offers marked nature trails, guided tours, and basic visitor information through its public pages and site map.

== Conservation and management ==
Kheri Murat’s declaration formed part of Pakistan’s Protected Areas Initiative and related 10 Billion Tree Tsunami/Green Stimulus programmes announced in 2020. Management is the responsibility of the Punjab Wildlife and Parks Department.

== See also ==
- List of national parks of Pakistan
- Protected areas of Pakistan
- Kala Chitta Range
- Attock District
