= Jubho Lagoon =

Ramsar site in Sindh, Pakistan

Coordinates: 24°20′N 68°40′E

Designations

Ramsar Wetland
- Designated: 10 May 2001
- Reference no.: 1067

Jubho Lagoon is a large shallow brackish lagoon located in Sindh, Pakistan. In May 2011 Jubhoo lagoon was inducted into the list of Ramsar sites, consisting of wetlands of international importance.

== Location and geography ==
The lagoon is located about 138 km south-east of Karachi in Jati, a subdivision of Sujawal District, in Sindh province of Pakistan. The site is located at an altitude of 50 m and has a total area of 1,745 acres (7.06 km^{2}). The natural wetland features brackish coastal and inland lagoons with associated marshes and mudflats. The site is also linked with other wetlands in the region through a tidal link canal. The region has a maritime climate with the monsoon period starting in June every year.

== Wildlife ==
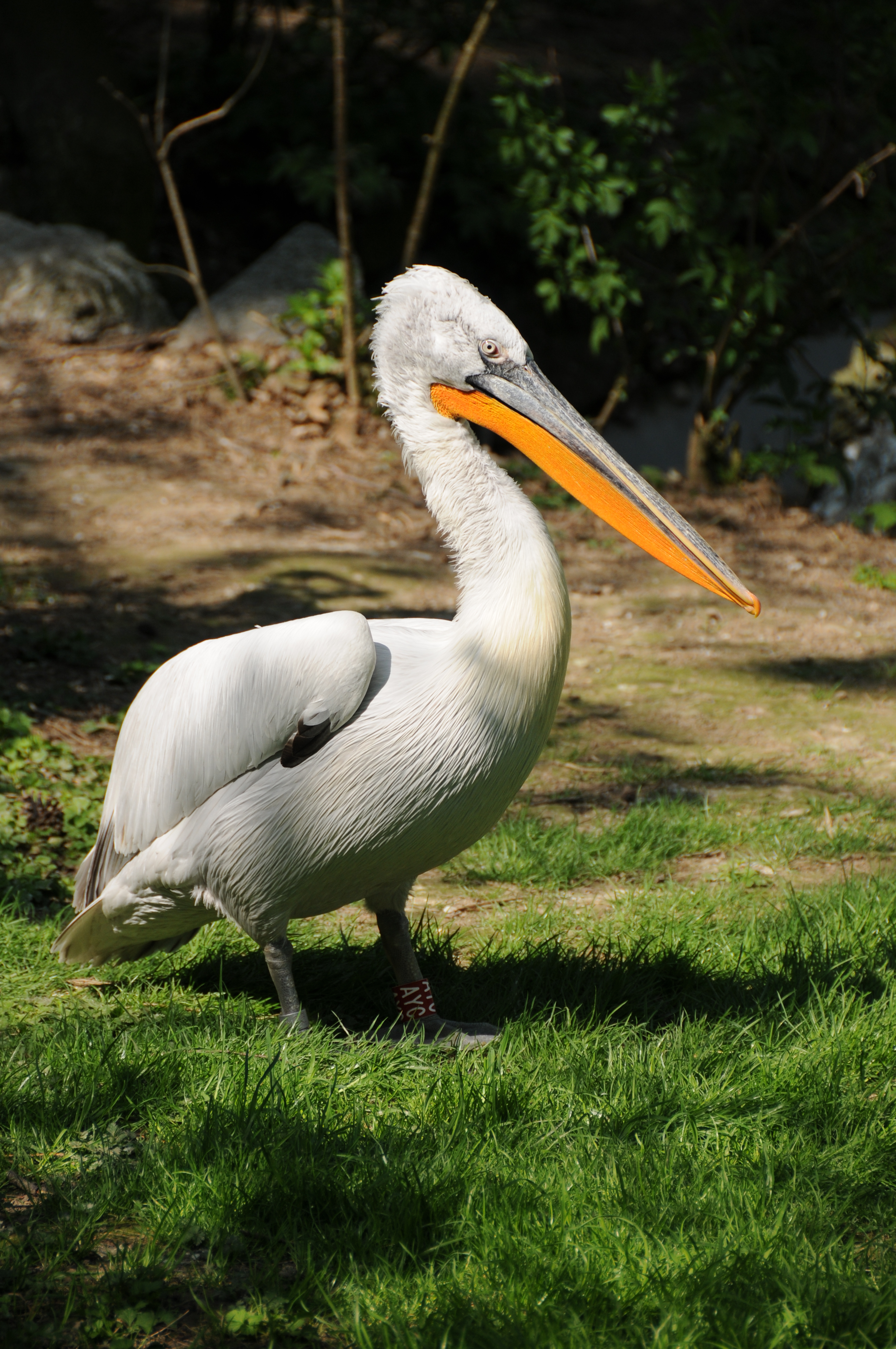
Jubho Lagoon is home to around 6,000 Dalmatian pelicans, which are listed as vulnerable

The site is an important habitat for waterbirds and supports around 60 to 100 thousand migratory birds annually. According to a 1997 census by the Zoological Survey Department of Pakistan, around 40 to 50 thousand American flamingos and Lesser flamingos were recorded in the region. The lagoon is also home to around six thousand Dalmatian pelicans, which are listed as vulnerable by IUCN. This is the largest concentration of these birds found in Pakistan. In the high-lying areas around the lagoon, Tamarix and other salt-tolerant bushes can be found. Low-lying areas, which receive fresh water inputs from outfall drains, are covered with Typha plants. Aside from this, due to shallow lagoons, very little vegetation is present in the area.

== Conservation ==
The land in the area is owned privately by locals whose primary sources of income are fishing and raising livestock. During winter, illegal hunting takes place on a large scale, which has reduced the numbers of migratory birds and local fauna. Moreover, due to the construction of the tidal link canal coupled with an increase in industrial and agricultural pollution, salt water intrusion is taking place, which is stunting the growth of freshwater vegetation. However, the site is still not protected under any environmental legislation or site-specific conservation programme. Few research projects to study the flora and fauna of the region have been undertaken by the Zoological Survey Department of Pakistan and the National Institute of Oceanography. The Coastal Ecosystem Unit of IUCN, Sindh Wildlife Department, and Sindh Environment Protection Agency conduct awareness and conservation activities in the region.

== See also ==
- Wetlands of Pakistan
- Protected areas of Pakistan
