= Salt Range =

Salt mine and mountain range in Punjab, Pakistan

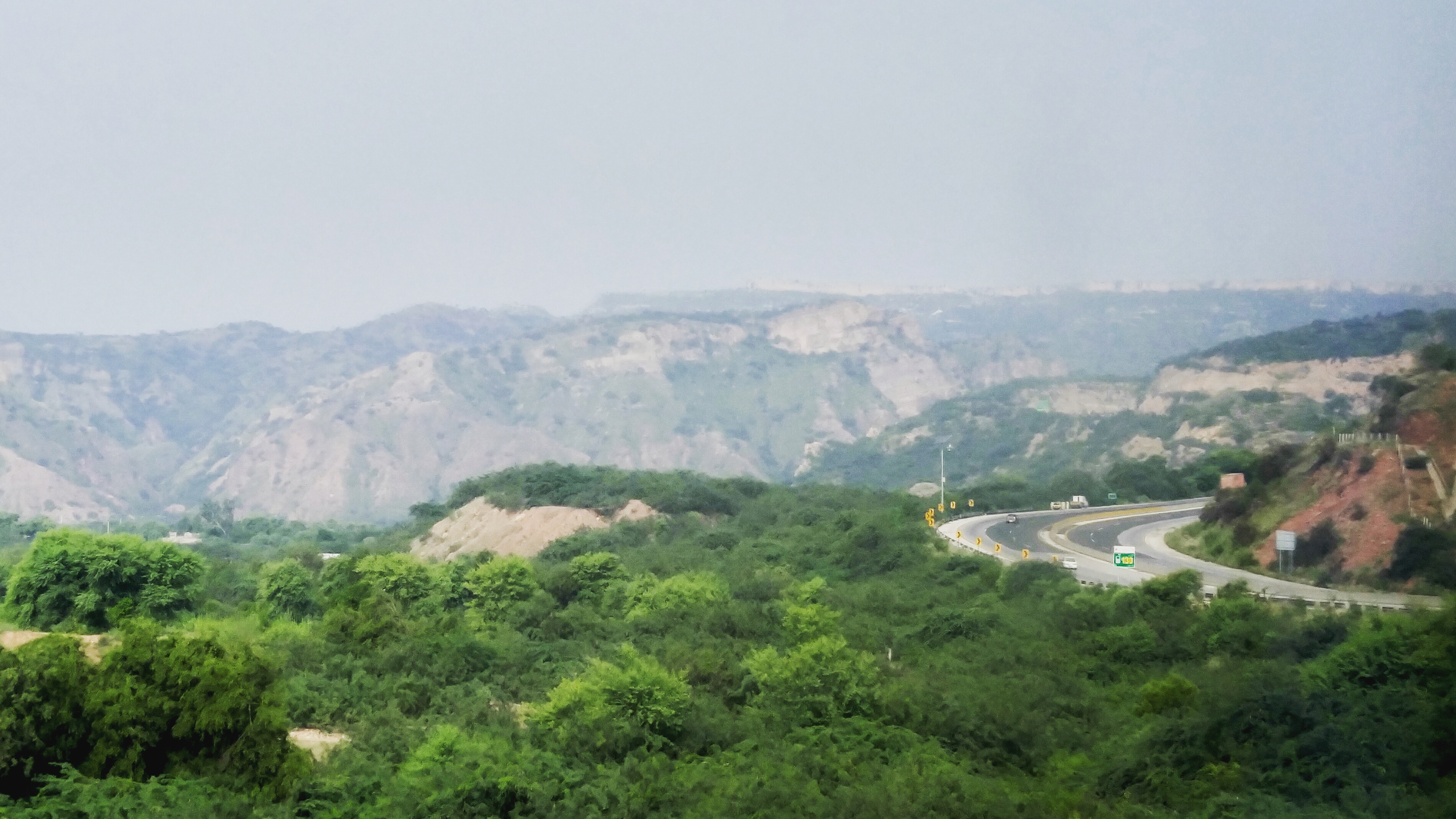
- Salt Range and Motorway M2

Highest point
- Peak: Sakesar
- Elevation: 1,522 m (4,993 ft)
- Listing: Mountains of Pakistan

Geography
- Location within Punjab, Pakistan Location within Pakistan
- Location: Punjab, Pakistan
- Range coordinates: 32°40′30″N 72°47′35″E

Climbing
- Easiest route: M-2 motorway
- Normal route: Kallar Kahar

The Salt Range (Urdu: کوہِ نمک; Punjabi: لوݨا پہاڑی دھارا), historically known as Koh-i-Jud (Urdu: کوہِ جود), is a mountain range in the northern Punjab, Pakistan, deriving its name from its extensive deposits of rock salt (known as Himalayan salt). The range extends along the south of the Potohar Plateau and the north of the Jhelum River. The Salt Range contains the large mines of Khewra, Kalabagh, and Warcha, which yield vast supplies of salt. Coal of a medium quality is also found here. The highest peak of the range is Sakesar.

In the Himalayas and the Salt Range, rock containing fossils of marine life go back to the Ediacaran period (up to 570 million years ago), which shows these rocks have developed out of sea sediments, and that where the Himalayas are now was once a sea.

== History ==
An inscription found at Kura in the Salt Range records the building of a Buddhist monastery by a person named Rotta Siddhavriddhi during the reign of the Huna ruler Toramana. The donor expresses the wish that the religious merit gained by his gift be shared by him with the king and his family members.

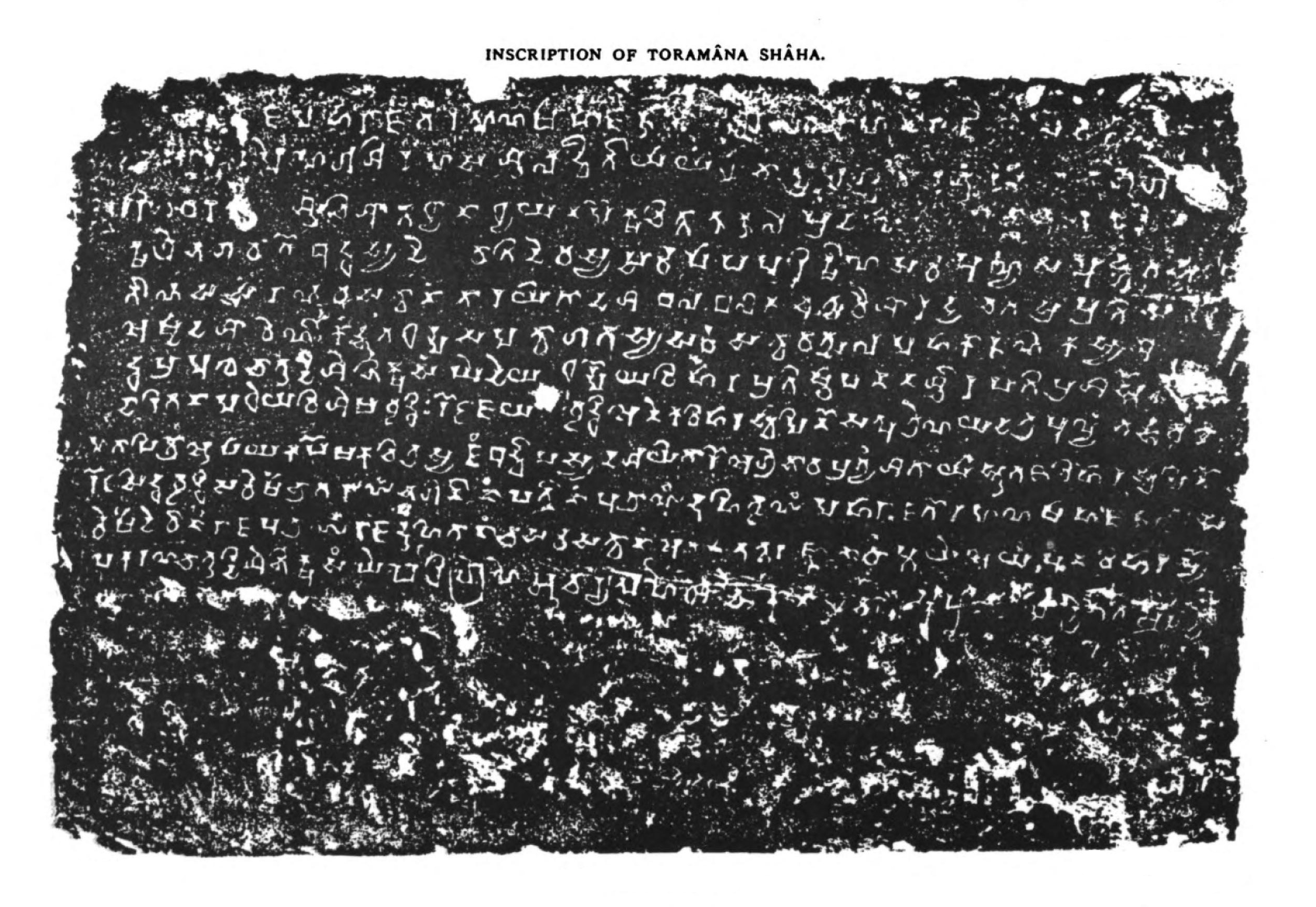
Khurā inscription (495-500 AD), from the Salt Range about king Toramana

The history of the Salt Range from the thirteenth century CE onwards has been a record of continuous conflict between various landowning and ruling Punjabi Muslim clans, including the Awan, Khokhar, Minhas, Gakhar, and Janjua, for sovereignty over the Salt Range and political ascendancy. According to emperor Babar, the Jud and the Janjua were "two races descended from the same father," who from old times had been rulers of the hills between Nilab and Bhera, that is, of the Salt Range. According to Baburnama: "On one-half of the hills lived the Jud, and on the other half the Janjua." Later the Awans occupied western half of these hills towards Nilab, and Janjuas the eastern part of these hills.

=== Archeological sites ===
Two archaeological sites are located close to Kathwai, Kutte Mar, and Tulaja Fort. At Kutte Mar to the Northeast of Kathwai are Muslim graves made of Kangar and the purported grave of a dog that is said to have died defending the wedding procession of its owner from an attack by bandits. Kutte Mar may have been the place where the Khura inscription of Toramana was found. If this assessment is correct, a Buddhist monastery was established here around 500 CE. This inscription and another fragmentary inscription found at Sakaser confirm that this area was a flourishing, center for Buddhism, which is borne out by the extensive archaeological remains.

The Tulaja fort is located on a huge rock outcropping with sheer cliffs overlooking the shrine of Kacchianwalla and the Punjab plains. The entire area is covered with the ruins of defensive walls, houses, and other structures made of large stone blocks. Although one building has been identified as a mosque, it is very difficult to distinguish other religious, military or civil structures. One of the most interesting features is a large square tank made of the flat rectangular bricks, which may have supplied water so that the fort could withstand a siege. Comparing this tank with those in other forts may help in assigning a relative date to its construction. In addition to architectural styles, evidence from any coin found here, may help to indicate if this city belonged to the period of the Turk Sultans, Lodhis or Mughals. Extensive remains of a cemetery and other settlements are on the slopes below the fort. There are also supposed to be some remains on Tulaji across the valley from Talaja.

== Wildlife ==
A Punjab urial at Kallar Kahar, Salt Range

The Salt Range has a high level of biodiversity and is home to a number of wildlife sanctuaries (Chumbi Surla, Jahlar Lake, Sodhi, Khabekki Lake and Kundal Rakh) and protected areas, including the Chinji National Park and several forests (e.g. Simli Reserved Forest and Noorpur Reserved Forest) and wetland areas (including Ucchali, Namal Lake, and Khabikki Lake). Salt Range is also home to Punjab urial, which is endemic to northern Punjab. The Indian rhinoceros once inhabited this region but now is extinct.

== Geology ==
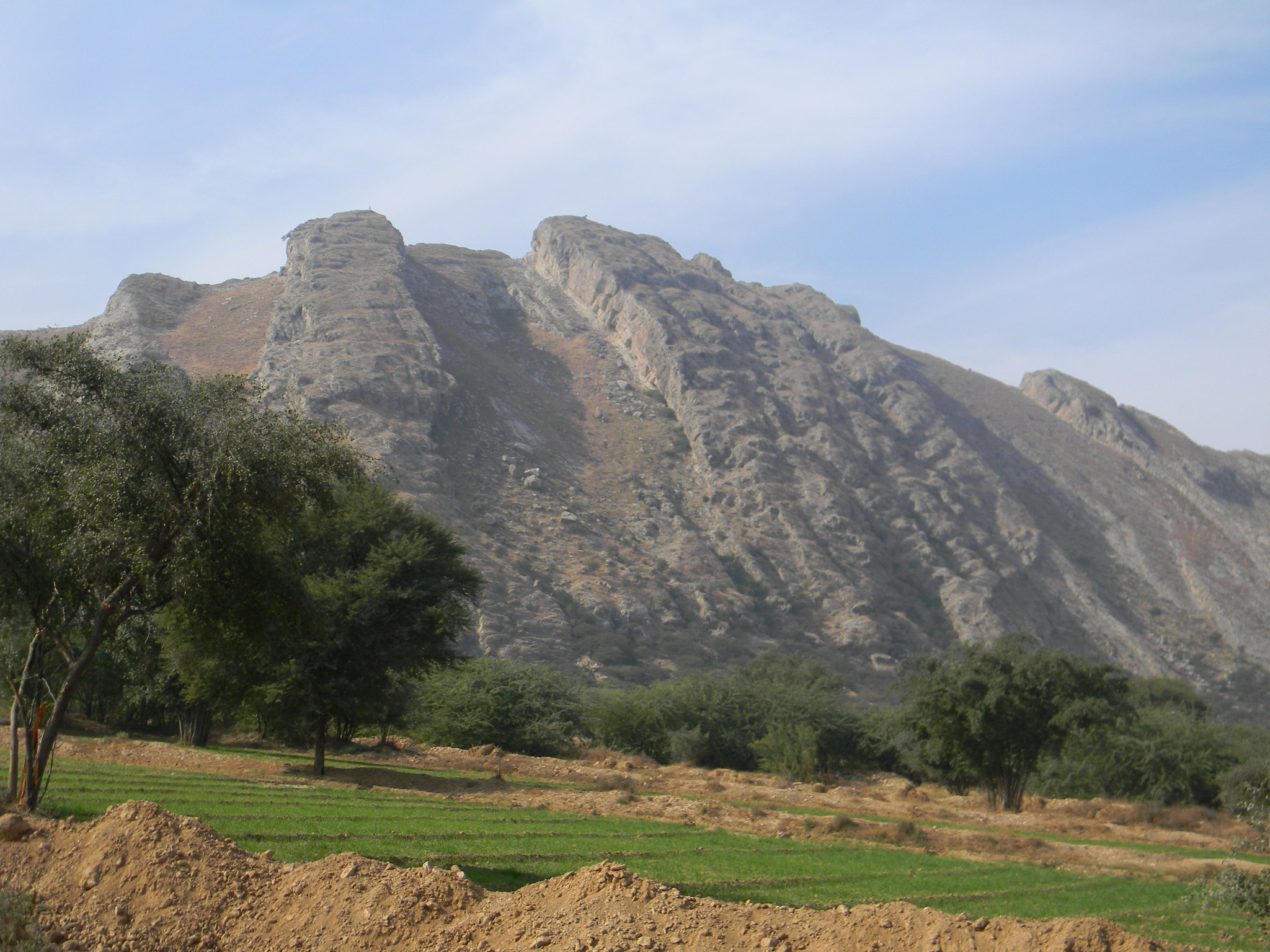
Salt Range in Mianwali District, Punjab, Pakistan

The Salt Range starts from the Bakralla and Tilla Jogian ridges in the east and extends to the west of River Jhelum. The Salt Range is the youngest and the most southern part of the western Himalayan Ranges in Pakistan. The range is unlike other Himalaya type, thrusting due to the mechanical strength of the Eocambrian salt near the base of the sedimentary strata overlying Indian basement rock. The mechanical difference between the salt and other sedimentary rock that have collided elsewhere in the greater Himalaya mountain range is that salt acts like a lubricant, not allowing friction between thrust sheets to build up higher topography. Instead, the thrust sheets slide easy on the salt and do not build high topographic relief. This is also why the Salt Range is further south and appears separated from the rest of the greater Himalaya thrust sheets.

The Eocambrian salt in the Salt Range has moved on the base of thrust sheets and has high flow characteristics. The salt flowed until it hit an obstruction in the basement rock. Seismic data of the area has been interpreted to suggest that normal faults in the basement rock acted as an obstruction for the salt to pile up against, building higher and higher topography until the salt overcame the obstruction at depth. The salt then flowed and bulged through the overlying strata, intruding Cambrian aged salt on top of Cenozoic strata.

== See also ==
- Kala Chitta Range
