= Cholistan Wildlife Sanctuary =

Sanctuary in Punjab, Pakistan

- پناهگاه حیات وحش چولستان
- Interactive map of Cholistan Wildlife Sanctuary
- Location: Cholistan Desert, Punjab, Pakistan
- Nearest city: Bahawalpur
- Coordinates: 28.940°N 72.132°E
- Area: 26,000 km^{2} (10,000 sq mi)

Cholistan Wildlife Sanctuary is located in Punjab, Pakistan. It comprises 2.6 million hectares.

== Topography ==
This desert can be classified into two geomorphic zones based on its topography. The territory of the northern section, known as Lesser Cholistan, has an area of around 7,770 km^{2}, bordering canal-irrigated areas, while the area of the southern region, known as Greater Cholistan, is 18,130 km^{2}. Low sandy ridges alternate with salty alluvial flats, known locally as dahars, to form the smaller Cholistan. Saline or saline-sodic soils are the two categories into which these soils fall, with pH values varying from 8.2 to 8.4 and from 8.8 to 9.6, respectively. The Greater Cholistan consists of river terraces, sizable sand dunes, and depressions. It is a wind-sorted sandy desert. The dunes are approximately 100 metres tall on average.

The region experiences a wide range of temperatures, with summers potentially reaching over 50°C. The temperature difference between day and night is significant. The region experiences sporadic, erratic, and sparse rainfall, often between 100 and 250 mm, primarily during the monsoon season.

== Flora and fauna ==
=== Fauna ===
List of fauna found in the sanctuary.

Mammals

#	Name	Scientific name	Picture
1	Caracal	Caracal caracal	
2	Jungle cat	Felis chaus	
3	Indian grey mongoose	Urva edwardsii	
4	Asiatic wildcat	Felis lybica ornata	
5	Indian jackal	Canis aureus indicus	
6	Bengal fox	Vulpes bengalensis	
7	Long-eared hedgehog	Hemiechinus auritus	
8	Chinkara	Gazella bennettii	
9	Nilgai	Boselaphus tragocamelus	
10	Indian ratel	Mellivora capensis indica	
11	Indian crested porcupine	Hystrix indica	
12	Indian hare	Lepus nigricollis	
13	Arabian wolf	Canis lupus arabs	
14	Indian boar	Sus scrofa cristatus	
15	White-footed fox	Vulpes vulpes pusilla	
16	Small Indian mongoose	Urva auropunctata	
17	Small Indian civet	Viverricula indica	

Birds

#	Name	Scientific name	Picture
1	Grey francolin	Ortygornis pondicerianus	
2	Desert lark	Ammomanes deserti	
3	Common starling	Sturnus vulgaris	
4	Houbara bustard	Chlamydotis undulata	
5	Great Indian bustard	Ardeotis nigriceps	
6	Black-bellied sandgrouse	Pterocles orientalis	
7	Great grey shrike	Lanius excubitor	
8	Spotted owlet	Athene brama	
9	Laggar falcon	Falco jugger	
10	Saker falcon	Falco cherrug	
11	Common buzzard	Buteo buteo	
12	Eurasian sparrowhawk	Accipiter nisus	
13	Tawny eagle	Aquila rapax	
14	Pallid harrier	Circus macrourus	
15	Eurasian collared dove	Streptopelia decaocto	
16	Cinereous vulture	Aegypius monachus	

Amphibians & reptiles

#	Name	Scientific name	Picture
1	Indian marbled toad	Duttaphrynus stomaticus	
2	Common skittering frog	Euphlyctis cyanophlyctis	
3	Indian bullfrog	Hoplobatrachus tigerinus	
4	Indian burrowing frog	Sphaerotheca breviceps	
5	Black pond turtle	Geoclemys hamiltonii	
6	Brown roofed turtle	Pangshura smithii	
7	Indian roofed turtle	Pangshura tecta	
8	Indian flapshell turtle	Lissemys punctata	
9	Indian softshell turtle	Nilssonia gangetica	
10	Oriental garden lizard	Calotes versicolor	
11	Brilliant ground agama	Trapelus agilis pakistanensis	–
12	Afghan ground agama	Trapelus megalonyx	–
13	Indian spiny-tailed lizard	Uromastyx hardwickii	
14	Sind gecko	Crossobamon orientalis	–
15	Rough-tailed gecko	Cyrtopodion scaber	
16	Yellow-belly gecko	Hemidactylus flaviviridis	
17	Leschenault's leaf-toed gecko	Hemidactylus leschenaultii	
18	Indian fringe-fingered lizard	Acanthodactylus cantoris	
19	Eremias cholistanica	Eremias cholistanica	–
20	Persian long-tailed desert lizard	Mesalina watsonana	
21	Striped mole skink	Eumeces indothalensis	–
22	Ribbon-sided skink	Eurylepis taeniolata	

#	Name	Scientific name	Picture
23	Indian three-banded skink	Eutropis trivittata	–
24	Bronze grass skink	Eutropis macularia	
25	Three-toed snake skink	Ophiomorus tridactylus	–
26	Bengal monitor	Varanus bengalensis	
27	Indian desert monitor	Varanus griseus koniecznyi	–
28	Sindh thread snake	Myriopholis blanfordi	–
29	Long-nosed worm snake	Myriopholis macrorhyncha	
30	Slender worm snake	Indotyphlops porrectus	–
31	Indian sand boa	Eryx johnii	
32	Indian gamma snake	Boiga trigonata	
33	Common cliff racer	Platyceps rhodorachis	
34	Hardwicke's rat snake	Platyceps ventromaculatus	
35	Dotted dwarf racer	Eirenis punctatolineatus	
36	Sind longnose sand snake	Lytorhynchus paradoxus	–
37	Pakistan sand racer	Psammophis leithii	–
38	Steppe ribbon racer	Psammophis lineolatus	
39	Red-spotted diadem snake	Spalerosophis arenarius	–
40	Black headed royal snake	Spalerosophis atriceps	
41	Checkered keelback	Xenochrophis piscator	
42	Indian cobra	Naja naja	
43	Sind krait	Bungarus sindanus	
44	Eastern saw-scaled viper	Echis carinatus sochureki	
