= Deh Akro-II Desert Wetland Complex =

Wildlife sanctuary in Sindh, Pakistan

- Deh Akro-II Wildlife Sanctuary
- Location within Pakistan Location within Sindh
- Location: Shaheed Benazirabad District, Sindh, Pakistan
- Nearest city: Naushahro Feroze
- Coordinates: 26°49′59″N 68°19′59″E
- Area: 20,500 ha (79 sq mi)
- Elevation: 50 metres (160 ft)
- Designation: Wildlife Sanctuary
- Established: 1988
- Governing body: Sindh Wildlife Department

Ramsar Wetland
- Designated: 5 November 2002
- Reference no.: 1,283

Deh Akro-II Desert Wetland Complex locally referred to as Deh Akro, is one of the ten Ramsar sites located in Sindh province of Pakistan. Designated under the Ramsar convention in 2002, the internationally significant site has mainly an inland wetland ecosystem and covers an area of around 20,500 hectares (51,000 acres).

== Location ==
The complex lies in central Sindh in Shaheed Benazirabad District, (Note: formerly known as Nawabshah District.) in proximity to the regions of Naushahra Feroz District at a distance of approximately 330 kilometres (210 mi) in the northeast of the provincial capital, Karachi. In the northeast of the complex, borders the Nara Desert which is a subdivision of the larger Thar Desert.

== Status ==
The site was officially declared a wildlife sanctuary in 1988. Moreover, proper measures were undertaken by WWF-Pakistan to make the wetland reach criteria; 1 – 6 and 8 for Ramsar designation in 2002. Later in 2004, the site was listed in Important Bird and Biodiversity Areas by BirdLife International under criteria; A1 and A4iii.

== Geography ==
Deh Akro-II Complex preserves a diverse collection of wildlife due to the alteration of geographic features within the confines of the complex. It comprises marshy areas, agricultural lands, sandy deserts, and wetlands, which collectively raise it a site holding the four varying habitats. In between the desert land with an average of 5 to 10-metre sand, there are plain interdunal valleys transversing with freshwater lakes in them. Out of a total of thirty-six lakes which form the wetland of the complex, five are freshwater lakes while the remaining lakes are mostly composed of brack water due to considerable salts concentrations. All are waterbodies from the local irrigations specially the Nara Canal (Note: via Jamrau Headworks.) of the Indus River of the region, and are also fed by rainwater. Due to water scarcity and climate change, the wetland complex which initially contained 45 lakes as of 1988, reduced to 36 lakes in 2003. Later in 2021, the number reportedly dropped to 32. There are also human settlements in the complex which include Kunjwaro, Nathantal, Lalantar, Drigadaro, Pokhal-wari, Husayfakir, and some others.

== Biodiversity ==
In Deh Akro-II Complex, the commonly inhabiting animals are crocodiles, otters, waterfowls, and fishes. A community of some of the rare and endangered species of the world survive here. Notable rare species inhabiting the sanctuary include; oriental darter (Anhinga melanogaster), garganey (Anas Querquedula), desert wildcat (Felis lybica), and black ibis (Pseudibis papillosa). The endangered animal species include Indian hog deer (Axis porcinus), fudge duck (Aythya nyroca), and mugger crocodile (Crocodylus palustris).

With over 20,000 waterbirds, the wildlife sanctuary supports 101 avian species. It hosts a total of 14 fishes, 16 reptilian, and 18 mammalian species which are listed as follows:

=== Fishes ===
Common name	Scientific name
Rohu	Labeo rohita
Dambru	Labeo nigripinnis
Orangefin Labeo	Labeo calbasu
Makhni	Ambassis nam
Giant Murrel	Channa marulius
Dayya	Tilapia mossombica
Catla	Labeo catla
Singhara	Mystus secnghala
Pla khao	Wallago attu
Gandan	Notopterus notopterus
Butter catfish	Ompok bimaculatus
Tank goby	Glossogobius giuris
Morakha	Cirrhinus mrigala
Palli	Gaduria chopra

=== Reptiles ===
Common name	Scientific name
Brahminy Blind Snake	Typhlops braminus
Indian sand boa	Eryx johni
Saw scaled	Viper Echis carinatus
Agama	Trapelus agilis
Afghan ground agama	Trapelus megalonyx
Indian spiny-tailed lizard	Saara hardwicki
Indian fringe-fingered lizard	Acanthodactylus contoris
Persian long-tailed desert lizard	Mesalina watsonana
Sind gecko	Crossobamon orientalis
Dwarf Gecko	Tropicolotes helenae
Indian sand-swimmer	Ophiomorus tridactylus
Indian monitor	Varanus bengalensis
Desert monitor	Varanus griseus
Brown-roofed turtle	Pangshura smithii
Spotted pond turtle	Geoclemys hamiltoni
Mugger crocodile	Crocodylus palustris

=== Mammals ===
Common name	Scientific name
Hedgehog	Hemiechinus auratus
Yellow throated Shrew	Suncus stoliczkanus
White-footed Fox	Vulpes vulpes pusilla
Golden Jackal	Canis aureus
Smooth-coated otter	Lutra perspicillata
Small Indian Mongoose	Urva auropunctatus
Desert wildcat	Felis lybica
Jungle cat	Felis chaus
Eurasian wild pig	Sus scrofa
Indian hog deer	Axis porcinus
Indian hare	Lepus nigrocollis
Indian Crested Porcupine	Hystrix indica
Five-striped palm squirrel	Funambulus pennanti
House Mouse	Mus musculus
Short-tailed Bandicoot Rat	Nesokia indica
Balochistan gerbil	Gerbillus nanus
Indian gerbil	Tatera indica
Indian Desert Jird	Meriones hurrianae

=== Marsh crocodiles ===
The national reptile of Pakistan, Crocodylus palustris, commonly called as the "marsh crocodile", has been a vital subject among species of crocodiles in the Indian subcontinent. In Deh Akro-II, the crocodile inhabits the swamps, marshlands, and lakes. Throughout the last three decades, this IUCN's redlisted species faced reduction in its population due to poaching, prolonged water shortage and habitat destruction in the Deh Akro-II. As of 2021, the international conservationists pointed out a 90 percent decline in the count of crocodiles during the period.
