= Khabikki Lake =

Body of water in Punjab, Pakistan

- کھبکی جھیل (Urdu)
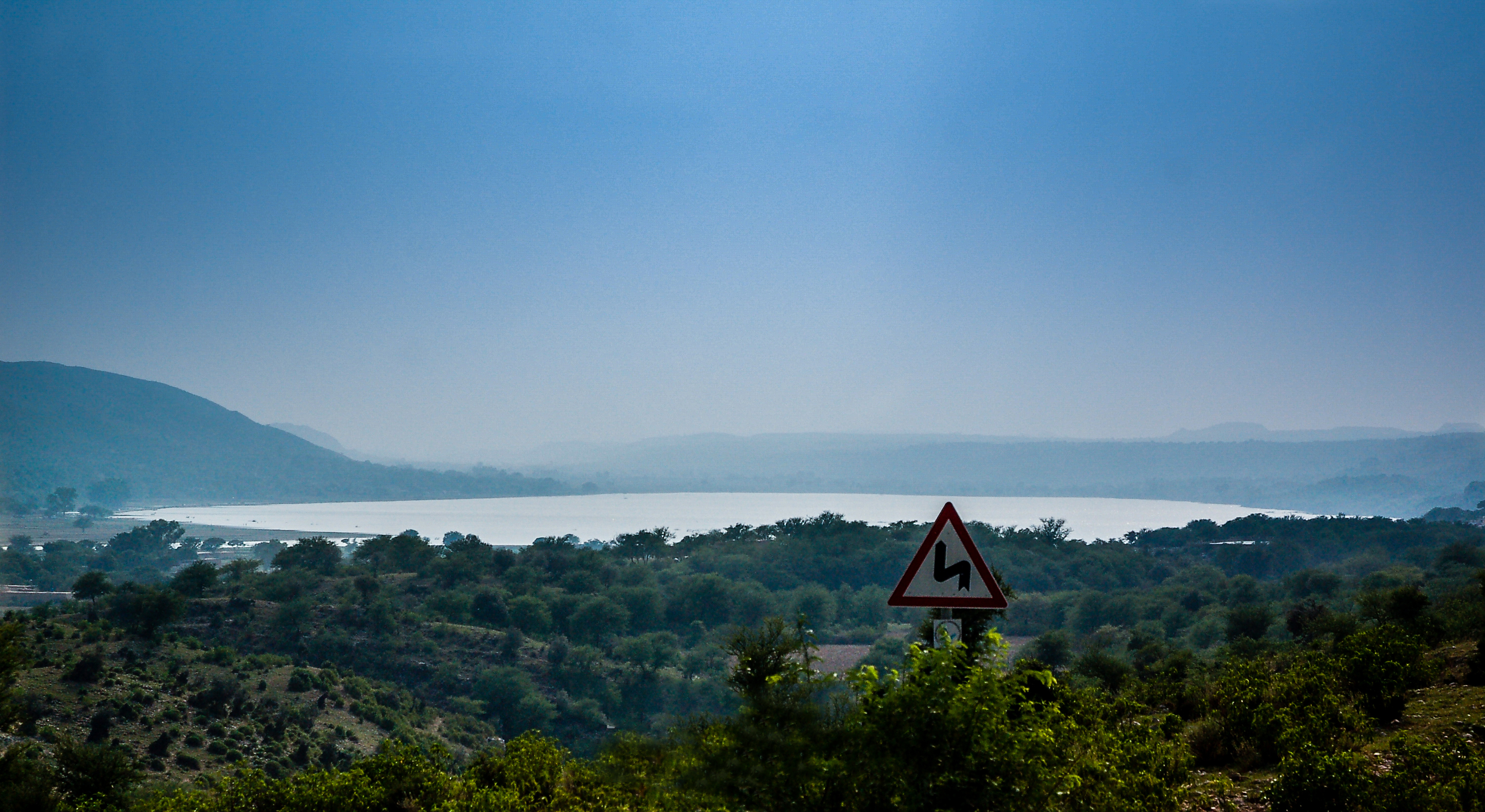
- Interactive map of Khabikki Lake
- Location: Salt Range, Pakistan
- Coordinates: 32.6219°N 72.2141°E
- Type: Salt lake
- Part of: Uchhali Complex
- Basin countries: Pakistan
- Max. length: 2 km (1.2 mi)
- Max. width: 1 km (0.62 mi)
- Surface area: 243 hectares (2.43 km^{2})
- Average depth: 0.2 to 6 m (0.66 to 19.69 ft)
- Surface elevation: 740 metres (2,430 ft)

Ramsar Wetland
- Designated: 22 March 1996

Khabikki Lake (Urdu: کھبکی جھیل) is a saltwater lake in the Soan Sakaser Valley in the southern Salt Range in Khushab District, Punjab, Pakistan.. It is a part of the Uchhali Wetlands Complex. In 1976, it was designated a Ramsar site, the first such site in Pakistan.

The lake is two kilometres long and one kilometer across at its widest, with a depth of 8 to 10 feet.. It is bordered by mountains on the north and south sides.

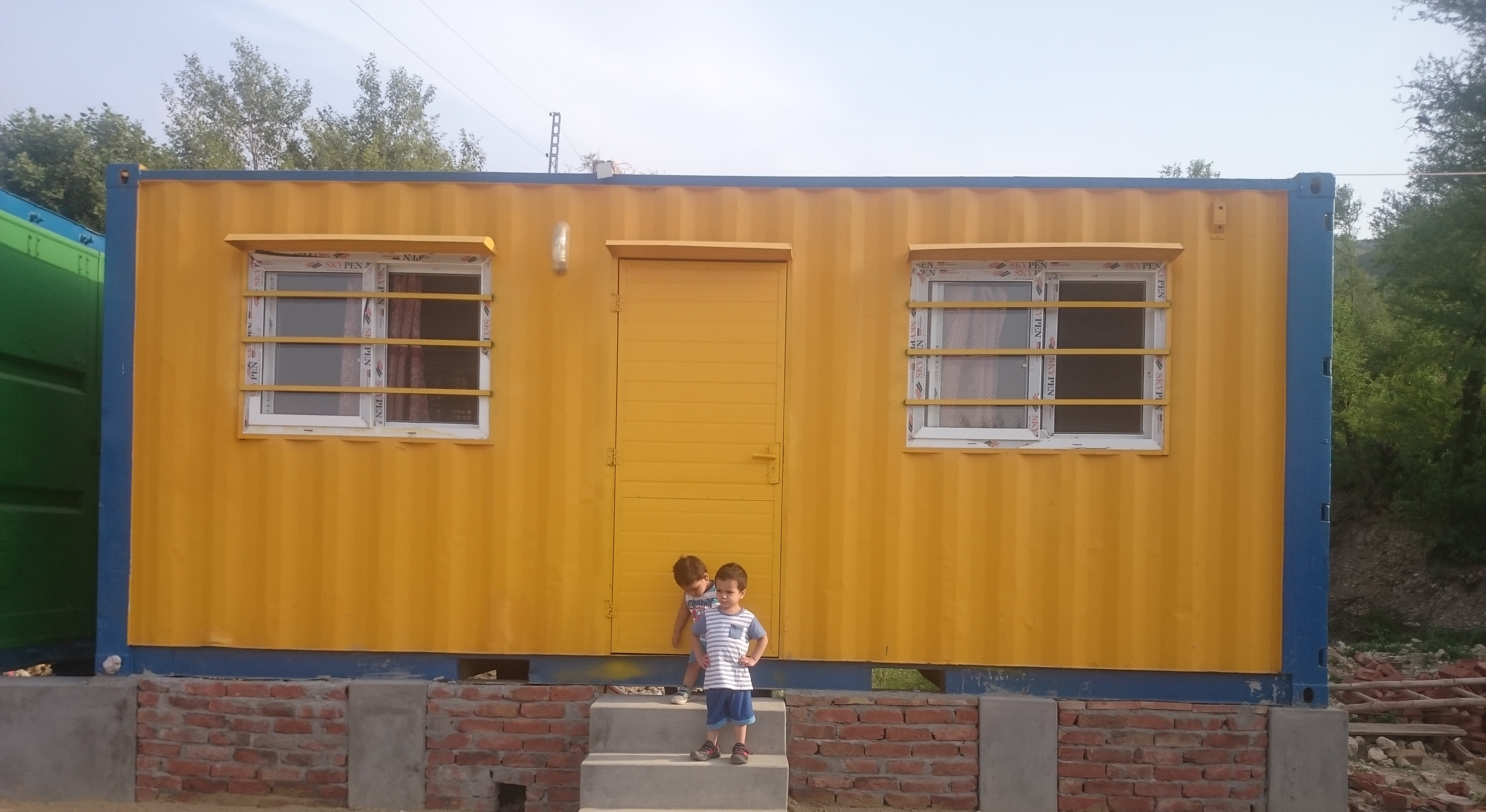
Residence at Khabikki Lake

Khabikki is also the name of a neighboring village.

== Recreation ==
Khabikki Lake is one of the notable recreational sites within the Salt Range region. The area offers several nature-based activities, including birdwatching (around 50 bird species are present there), lakeside walks, and landscape photography. During the winter months, the lake becomes an attractive spot for observing migratory birds that arrive from Siberia and Central Asia, making it a popular destination for both casual visitors and wildlife enthusiasts.

Boats are available, and there are two places to stay. A recreational resort has been established by the Tourism Development Corporation of Pakistan with all necessary facilities and quick access to the resort from the main road.

== See also ==
- Uchhali Lake
- Soan Sakaser Valley
