= Thanedar Wala =

Ramsar site in Khyber Pakhtunkhwa, Pakistan

Designations

Ramsar Wetland
- Official name: Thanedar Wala Game Reserve
- Designated: 23 July 1976
- Reference no.: 97

Thanedar Wala is a game reserve and wetland Ramsar site, located 15 km (9.3 mi) east of Lakki, Lakki Marwat District (formerly in Bannu District), North-West Frontier Province, Pakistan. Most of the area consists of a complex of braided river channels and sandy or muddy islands up to 4 km (2.5 mi) wide. The site covers 4,047 ha (10,000 acres). It supports wintering great egret, ruddy shelduck, common teal, mallard, northern shoveller, common pochard and ferruginous duck. Collared pratincole and little tern breed on the reserve.

Thanedar Wala was designated a Ramsar site on July 23, 1976. A monitoring mission in May 1990 recommended that it be retained on the Ramsar List.
