= Forestry, Wildlife and Fisheries department, Punjab =

Forestry, Wildlife and Fisheries Punjab
- جنگلات، حیات وحش و ماهیگیری پنجاب

Agency overview
- Formed: 1886; 140 years ago
- Jurisdiction: Punjab, Pakistan
- Website: fwf.punjab.gov.pk

Forestry, Wildlife and Fisheries is a department of Government of Punjab, Pakistan. The department itself has three separate departments.

== Department of Fisheries ==
The Department of Fisheries is an attached department of Forestry, Wildlife & Fisheries Department established in 1912. The department is responsible for conservation, management and development of aquatic resources in public and private sectors.

The department is governed by the Punjab Fisheries Ordinance, 1961.

== Department of Forest ==
The Department of Forest is an attached department of Forestry, Wildlife & Fisheries Department created in 1886 under British rule as imperial forest service. The Department is responsible to develop, maintain, conserve & maximize forestry sector resources in the province of Punjab.

Forest department is governed under Forest Act, 1927 Amended 2010.

== Wildlife Department ==
Punjab Wildlife & Parks Department was established as Game Department in 1934. The department is responsible for management, preservation, conservation of wildlife diversity, habitats and sustainable development.

The department is governed under Punjab wildlife Protection, Preservation, Conservation & Management Act, 1974.

== See also ==
- Ministry of National Food Security & Research
- Forestry in Pakistan
- Fishing in Pakistan
- Wildlife of Pakistan
