= Astore Wildlife Sanctuary =

Wildlife refuge in Astore, Pakistan

Coordinates: 35.6333°N 74.6667°E

- Location within Pakistan
- Location: Astore District
- Nearest town: Bungi
- Area: 414.72 km^{2} (160.12 sq mi)
- Max. elevation: 6,060 m (19,880 ft)
- Min. elevation: 1,212 m (3,976 ft)
- Designated: 22 November 1975
- Named for: Astore Valley

Astore Wildlife Sanctuary is as wildlife refuge located in Gilgit–Baltistan, Pakistan. It is within the Astore District, between Nanga Parbat 8,126 metres (26,660 ft) to the west and the plains of Deosai to the east, and about 11 km (6.8 mi) from the town of Bungi. Its area is approximately 414.72 km^{2} (160.12 sq mi) and its altitude is from 1,212 m (3,976 ft) to 6,060 m (19,880 ft).

The sanctuary is home to a small population of the near threatened (since 2015) Astor Markhor, the national animal of Pakistan, it further provides home to endangered snow leopard, Himalayan brown bear and Eurasian lynx.
