= Chumbi Surla Wildlife Sanctuary =

Wildlife sanctuary in Punjab, Pakistan

- IUCN category IV (habitat/species management area)
- Location within Pakistan
- Location: Chakwal, Punjab, Pakistan
- Coordinates: 32°40′12.15″N 72°19′48.02″E
- Area: 559.45 km^{2} (216.00 sq mi)
- Elevation: 754 m
- Established: 1978
- Governing body: Wildlife and Parks Department, Government of Punjab

Chumbi Surla Wildlife Sanctuary (shortened as Chumbi Surla) is a wildlife sanctuary covering an area of 22,640 hectares (55,945 acres). It is located in Khushab District and Chakwal District, Punjab, Pakistan. It was established in 1978, for the purpose of conserving the threatened species of urial among several others.

== Habitat ==
The area is surrounded by reserve forests and hills. Average altitude ranges between 460-1050 m above the sea level. Temperature is between 10-40°C while average annual rainfall is 4994 mm. The forest supports scrub biome having dry subtropical evergreen vegetation.
