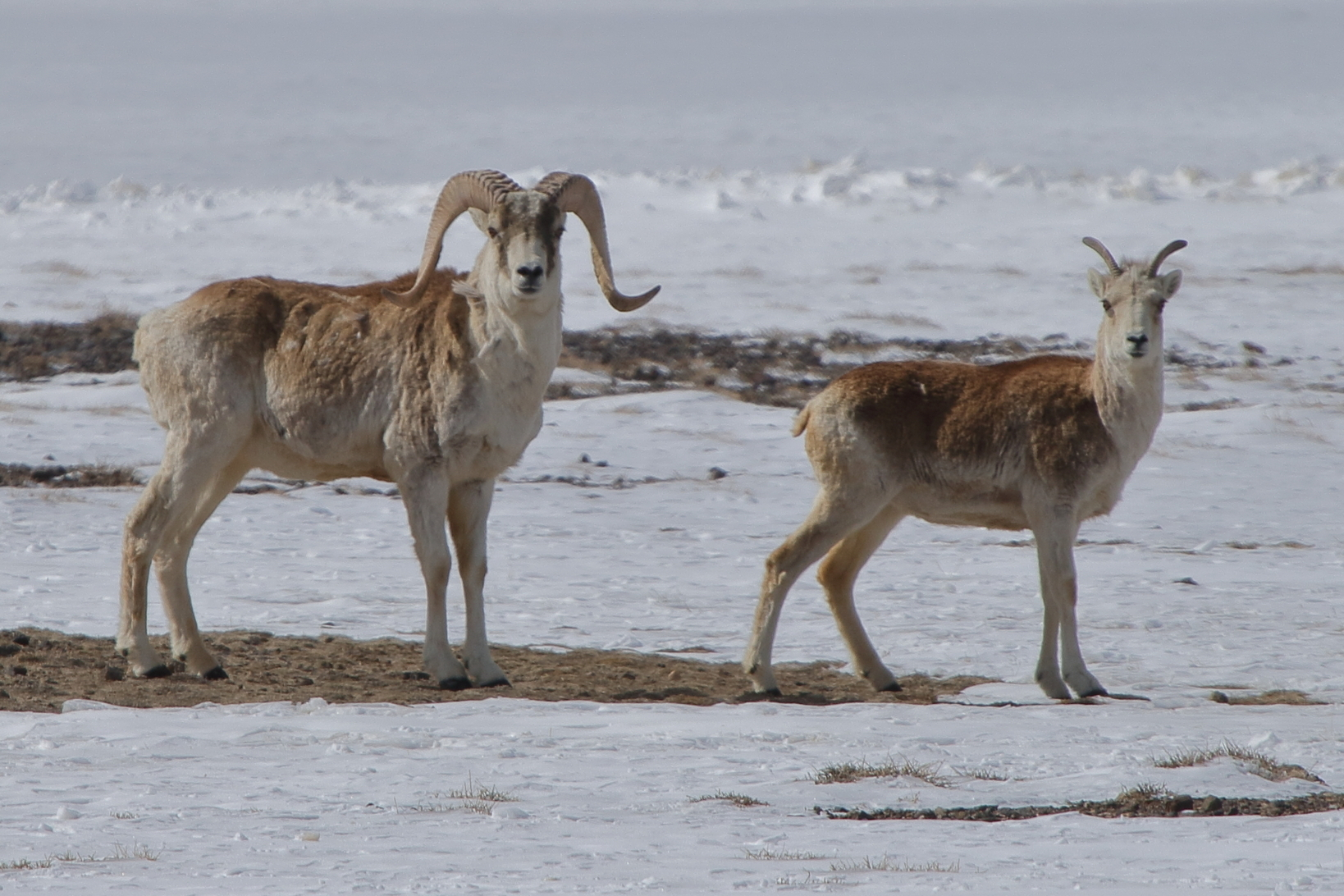
- A pair of Marco Polo sheep in Murghob

Conservation status
- Near Threatened (IUCN 3.1) (Note: The IUCN redlist lists endangered animals by species: although the IUCN recognizes the subspecies, it does not give the status of each one. The species Ovis ammon has been listed as near threatened. (Harris & Reading 2008))
- CITES Appendix II

Scientific classification
- Kingdom: Animalia
- Phylum: Chordata
- Class: Mammalia
- Infraclass: Placentalia
- Order: Artiodactyla
- Family: Bovidae
- Subfamily: Caprinae
- Genus: Ovis
- Species: O. ammon
- Subspecies: O. a. polii

Trinomial name
- Ovis ammon polii Blyth, 1841

Synonyms
- Ovis ammon poli Ovis ammon poloi Ovis ammon sculptorium Ovis ammon typica Ovis poli

= Marco Polo sheep =

Subspecies of argali sheep

The Marco Polo sheep (Ovis ammon polii) is a subspecies of argali sheep, named after Marco Polo. Their habitats are the mountainous regions of Central Asia. Marco Polo sheep are distinguishable mostly by their large size and spiraling horns. Their conservation status is near threatened and efforts have been made to protect their numbers and keep them from being hunted. It has also been suggested that crossing them with domestic sheep could have agricultural benefits.

== Naming ==
The binomial name of the species as a whole is Ovis ammon, described by Swedish naturalist Carl Linnaeus in 1758, and all members of the species are commonly called "argali". The Marco Polo subspecies Ovis ammon polii was first described scientifically by zoologist Edward Blyth in 1841. These sheep are also commonly called "Marco Polo's Argali" or the "Pamir Argali.".

The sheep are named after the 13th century explorer Marco Polo because they were described in The Travels of Marco Polo. The 1914 Historical and Political Gazetteer of Afghanistan: Badakhshan notes that in Badakhshan Province, Afghanistan the sheep are known locally as nakhjipar. They are called "ra-ma-poy" in Wakhi, the language of natives of the Khunzerav region round the high Khunjerab Pass between Pakistan and China.

== Characteristics ==
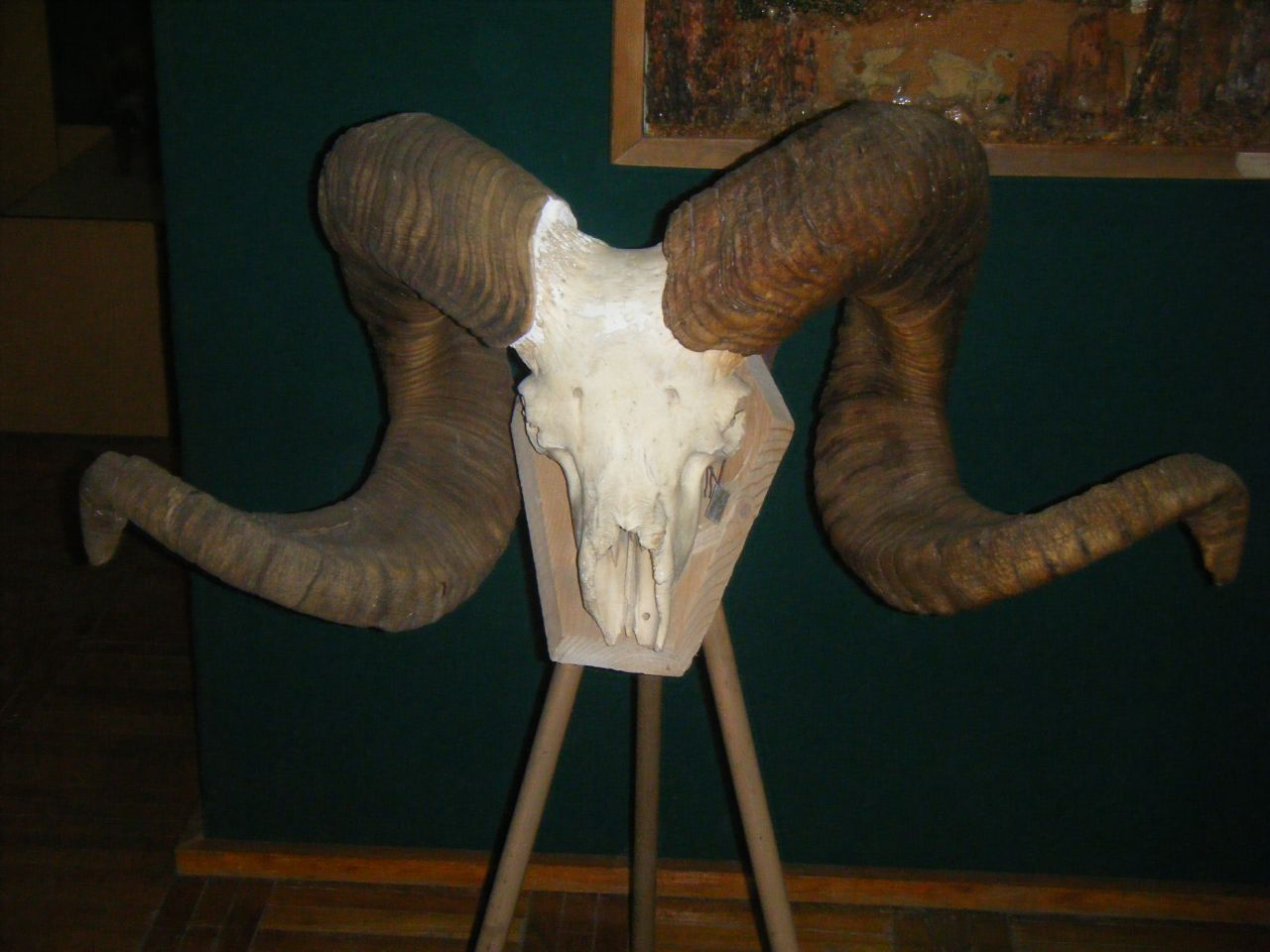
Skull of an old male with large horns

The sheep is particularly known for its long, spiraling horns which have been measured having a span up to 140 cm (55 in). They have the longest horns of all sheep, with the longest individual horn ever recorded measuring 1.9 m (6.2 ft) and weighing 60 lb (27 kg). O. a. polii's horns follow a coil pattern, with the tips pointed directly away horizontally from the head; in spite of this, the tips are rarely broken. The horns have long been a popular attraction for trophy hunters. They begin growing 15–20 days after the sheep are born, and their growth in length is most pronounced during the first year. Thickness growth is most noticeable during the first two years.

Ovis ammon sheep are colored a dark brown, with white underparts; the two different sections are separated by a dark band of hair. There is a white patch on the rump as well, which is not so clearly defined on most subspecies except O. a. polii. As winter approaches, the white hair on males grows longer, until it becomes a prominent ruff, although on O. a. polii the ruff stands out less than other subspecies. Females' coats are lighter than the males', and do not have such a drastic seasonal change. The Marco Polo sheep's face is lighter colored than the body.

Most argali have a round tail approximately 6 to 10 centimetres (2.4 to 3.9 in) long, ending in a tuft of hair; O. a. polii's tail is a little bit longer: around 12 to 16 centimetres (4.7 to 6.3 in).

Mature rams on average weigh 126 kg (278 lb). At the withers, rams grow to approximately 113 cm (44 in) in height and ewes to 100 cm (39 in). The sheep rut in December. Gestation lasts about 160 days, with single births being normal and twins uncommon. A captive ewe once gave birth to five lambs at once, then triplets two years later.

Marco Polo sheep have an average life span of 13 years. The horns develop rings each year by which the age of male animals may be determined. Since females do not have horns, it is harder to determine their age.

No data have been compiled showing the susceptibility of the sheep to disease, although tests have been run on similar species of sheep and the data may be similar. Since Marco Polo sheep are reluctant to approach people, it is not likely that they can catch diseases common to domestic flocks, although some domestic sheep are allowed to run wild over the mountains, and it is unknown if they come into contact with Marco Polo sheep. However, the shepherds in the area do not generally have access to veterinary care for their animals, and it is possible that these could transmit diseases to the wild sheep.

== Habitat ==
Most Marco Polo sheep live in the Pamir Mountains region adjacent to the borders of Afghanistan, Pakistan, Kyrgyzstan, Tajikistan and China. Their elevation ranges from 3,700 to 4,800 m (12,100 to 15,700 ft) above sea level. The subspecies lives mainly in the northwestern part of the Hunza district of Pakistan along the Chinese border, inhabiting the Kilik Mintaka border and the northwestern area of Khunjerab National Park. Marco Polo sheep also inhabit the Wakhan Corridor, along the Afghanistan border. They share much of their habitat with animals such as the Siberian ibex. During summer, Marco Polo sheep prefer to be near riparian areas and vegetation, while during winter they prefer to be in gentler and south-facing mountain slopes. Terrain ruggedness and annual mean temperature are the two major factors that affect their distribution.

== Behavior ==
Marco Polo sheep are similar in behavior to other members of the genus Ovis. They generally live in small flocks of a few dozen. During the summer, they break into smaller flocks of the same sex. During and after the rut, however, they group together to form larger groups for protection, and to conserve energy.

When the rut begins, rams begin to fight for dominance among their flocks; dominant rams then choose their ewes without competition from the losers. Only mature rams (those over 6 years old) fight for dominance. The young will sometimes threaten older males, but never charge them. The mature rams fight by standing next to each other and spinning around, then one steps back and charges. O. a. polii males have been noted to rise up on their hind legs when they clash with opponents, which is not common in lowland sheep and similar to the fighting habits of goats. The males commonly emit grunts while fighting and often chip their horns or break their noses.

After dominance has been established, the rams begin to select their ewes. Although Marco Polo sheep rams are known to herd females, during the rut males pair off with females to reproduce. Males will approach a flock of females and smell the urine of possible mates. When smelling the ewe's urine, the males display the Flehmen response to test if the ewe is in estrus. Shackleton calls this phenomenon "lip-curl" and describes it as "raising the head with the mouth open and upper lip curled back." The ram then splits from the flock to copulate with his ewe and afterward will often stay with the flock for a month or two.

== Conservation ==
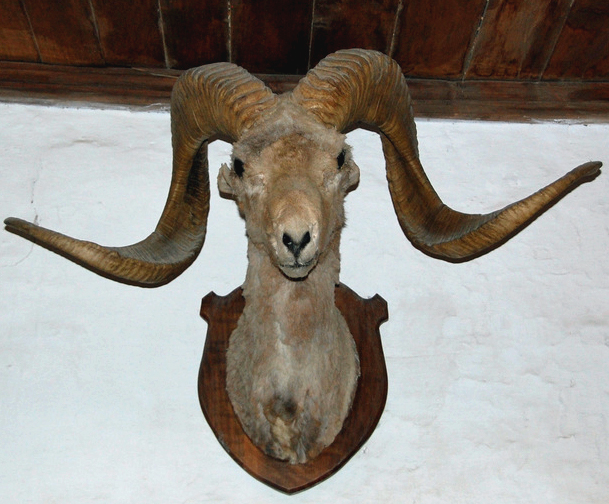
A Marco Polo sheep head as a hunting trophy, mounted on a wall

=== Hunting ===
Hunting the Marco Polo sheep first became popular when Mohammed Zahir Shah, king of Afghanistan, hunted and killed a ram in the 1950s. He thereafter declared that the valley in which he hunted be a protected habitat for the sheep as a hunting grounds for Afghan royalty, and it was not until 1968 that an American tourist was allowed to hunt in the reserve. In 2008, it was estimated that American hunters paid an average of $20,000 to $25,000 for an expedition to hunt a Marco Polo sheep. A recent study put the cost at $40,000 per permit.

In 1976, in Khunzerav, the sheep's population was estimated to be 300. This number declined to a maximum of 160 between 1978 and 1981, and declined again to only 45 in 1991. George Schaller of the Wildlife Conservation Society estimated the worldwide population in 2003 as around 10,000, half what Ronald Petocz estimated in his 1973 tour. Their population density has been recorded as fewer than two animals per 1 square kilometre (0.39 sq mi). The Marco Polo sheep was included on the first list of protected species issued by the Afghanistan National Environmental Protection Agency in June 2009.

In 2024, an American man pleaded guilty to illegally importing body parts of Marco Polo sheep to create clone hybrids, which he planned to sell to private hunting reserves in Texas. One of the illegally cloned sheep was placed in the Rosamond Gifford Zoo in 2025.

=== Khunjerab National Park ===
The Khunjerab National Park was established primarily as a means to protect the Marco Polo sheep (as well as snow leopards and bharal) living in the area. The borders of the park were mapped by Schaller in 1974, after a short field survey. The park was formally established on April 29, 1975 by Prime Minister of Pakistan Zulfikar Ali Bhutto, who said that "it must become a world famous park".

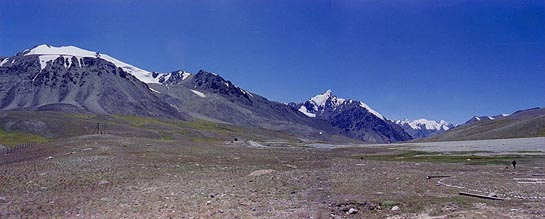
Mountains in the Khunjerab National Park

Despite being listed as a category 2 national park, banning human activities including agriculture and hunting, the park was poorly managed, meaning that illegal hunting of the Marco Polo sheep continued. Because of this, the International Union for Conservation of Nature commissioned Norwegian biologist Per Wegge to do a wildlife survey of the park in 1988. Wegge found that there was no evidence of competition between the domestic sheep being illegally grazed and the wild Marco Polo sheep, and that most of the illegal hunting was not being done by local Wakhi residents, but by Pakistani military and civil officials. He therefore proposed that the park be reclassified, allowing grazing and commercial hunting, with the profits going to local residents. However, the government overlooked Wegge's suggestions, instead drawing up a new management plan, which both the IUCN and the World Wildlife Fund supported as a means to preserve the park and protect the wildlife. Wegge was critical of the government scheme, claiming that it was based on financial considerations, with the Pakistani government hoping to attract tourists to the area. The IUCN agreed with this, and has since distanced itself from the national park. To help protect the animals from poaching, the WWF has created the Khunjerab Village Organization, which relies on people living in the area to report poaching or endangered animal sightings.

=== Pamir Peace Park ===
In 2008, George Schaller launched a campaign to protect the Marco Polo sheep. After the Khunjerab National Park was established by Pakistan in 1975; and the Taxkorgan Nature Reserve similarly settled in China in 1984, Schaller noted that the parks were insufficient to protect the sheep, due to their seasonal migrations. Schaller, among others, then proposed an international reserve in 1987 to combat the problem, but the effort was stalled due to political difficulties. "It's never easy to get the governments of four countries to agree on anything," Schaller has said of his efforts. His mission was to found a park straddling the borders of China, Pakistan, Afghanistan and Tajikistan in which the sheep would be protected. Schaller called the proposed reserve the "Pamir International Peace Park."

== Agriculture ==
According to Marco Polo's original description of the sheep, the horns (which he described as "as much as six palms in length") were used by shepherds to craft large bowls, or to build pens for the flocks. This sheep may be crossed with domestic sheep to provide larger cuts of leaner meat. Additionally, as the meat of Marco Polo sheep is said to lack the muttony flavor of domestic sheep meat, researchers for the United States National Research Council Advisory Committee on Technology Innovation concluded that the meat of a cross may prove popular with consumers. However, Marco Polo sheep could be bred for more than just meat: their horns could be valuable, as could their hides or their wool.

== Sources ==
- Afghanistan Biodiversity Conservation Program June/Sept 2006 Technical Report, Wildlife Conservation Society, 2006, archived from the original on July 5, 2022
- Bergreen, Laurence (2007), Marco Polo: From Venice to Xanadu, London: Quercus, ISBN 978-1-84724-345-4
- British Museum (1885), British Museum of Natural History (ed.), Guide to the Galleries of Mammalia (7th ed.), Harvard University
- Childress, Diana (2007), Marco Polo's Journey to China (Pivotal Moments in History), Twenty-First Century Books, ISBN 978-0-8225-5903-0
- Dan, Liu (2006), Number of endangered Marco Polo sheep increasing in NW China, Xinhua, archived from the original on July 27, 2009
- David Shackleton, ed. (May 1999), "The Status of Some Wild Sheep Populations in the CIS (Former USSR) and the Impact of Trophy Hunting" (PDF), Caprinae, IUCN/SSC Caprinae Specialist Group, archived from the original (PDF) on 2011-07-21
- Dohner, Janet (2002), The Encyclopedia of Historic and Endangered Livestock and Poultry Breeds, Yale University Press, p. 514, ISBN 0-300-08880-9
- Fedosenko, Alexander; Blank, David (2005), Mammalian Species: Ovis Ammon (PDF), American Society of Mammalogists
- Geist, Valerius (2009), "Argali", Encyclopædia Britannica Online, Encyclopædia Britannica, archived from the original on 2015-05-01
- Harris, R. B.; Reading, R. (2008), "Ovis Ammon", IUCN Red List of Threatened Species
- Huffman, Brent (2004-04-22), Ovis ammon: Argali sheep, archived from the original on 2010-01-29
- Ives, Jack (2004), Himalayan Perceptions: Environmental Change and the Well-being of Mountain Peoples, Routledge, ISBN 0-415-31798-3
- Kalland, Arne; Bruun, Ole (1995), Asian perceptions of nature: a critical approach, Surrey: Curzon, ISBN 0-7007-0290-3
- Kemf, Elizabeth (1993), The Law of the Mother: Protecting Indigenous Peoples in Protected Areas, Earthscan, p. 296, ISBN 1-85383-167-0
- Khan, Omayma (2008-07-01), The One That Got Away, World Wildlife Fund, archived from the original on 2012-04-06
- Long, Marion (2008-02-21), "George Schaller's Grand Plan to Save the Marco Polo Sheep", Discover
- Lovgren, Stefan (2006), World's Largest Sheep Are "Icons" of Threatened Region, Naturalist Says, National Geographic, archived from the original on March 16, 2006
- Magin, Chris; Groombridge, Brian (1994), "Ovis amon" (PDF), Convention on International Trade in Endangered Species Database, United Nations Environment Programme
- Miller, Daniel (2006-02-10), Afghanistan Agriculture Moving Forward (PDF), United States Agency for International Development, archived from the original (PDF) on 2008-12-16
- Miller, Robert (2010-02-06), "Roxbury's Schaller Talks of the Need for Conservation", The News-Times, David Dear, archived from the original on 2010-02-10
- National Environmental Protection Agency Declares Afghanistan's First Protected Species List, U.S. Department of State (embassy of the United States in Kabul, Afghanistan), 2009-06-03, archived from the original on 2009-07-27
- Ostrowski, Stéphane (January 2007), Wakhi Livestock in Big Pamir in 2006 (PDF), United States Agency for International Development, archived from the original (PDF) on July 18, 2011
- Petocz, Ronald (1978), Report on the Afghan Pamir: part 2, biology of Marco Polo sheep (PDF), Food and Agriculture Organization of the United Nations
- Roberts, T.J. (May 1998), Mammals of Pakistan (2nd ed.), OUP Pakistan, ISBN 0-19-577760-3
- Satkeev, Ryskeldi (2008-12-12), Rich Bowden (ed.), Commercial Hunting Endangers Rare Central Asian Sheep Species, archived from the original on 2011-06-05
- Schaller, George (2007), "A Proposal for a Pamir International Peace Park", Proceedings (RMRS–P–49), United States Forest Service: 227–231
- Schaller, George (1998), Wildlife of the Tibetan Steppe, University of Chicago Press, ISBN 978-0-226-73652-5
- Schaller, George; Kang, Aili (2008), "Status of Marco Polo sheep Ovis ammon polii in China and adjacent countries: conservation of a Vulnerable subspecies", Oryx, 42, Wildlife Conservation Society: 100–106, doi:10.1017/S0030605308000811, S2CID 85642036, archived from the original on 2016-10-05
- Shackleton, David (1997), Wild Sheep and Goats and their cousins, Cambridge: International Union for Conservation of Nature and Natural Resources, p. 360, ISBN 978-2-8317-0353-4
- Shackleton, David; Shank, C.C. (1984), "A Review of the Social Behavior of Feral and Wild Sheep and Goats" (PDF), Journal of Animal Science, 58 (2), American Society of Animal Science: 500–509, doi:10.2527/jas1984.582500x
- Sharma, Budh Dev; Kumari, Tej (2002-01-01), Indian Wildlife, Anmol Publications, ISBN 978-81-261-1132-9
- Spillett, J. Juan; Bunch, Thomas D.; Foote, Warren C. (1975), "The Use of Wild and Domestic Animals and the Development of New Genotypes", Journal of Animal Science, American Society of Animal Science, archived from the original on 2009-07-31
- United States National Research Council Advisory Committee on Technology Innovation (1983), Little-known Asian animals with a promising economic future, National Academy Press
- Wallace, Scott (2007), "Lifetime Achievement: Biologist George Schaller", Best of Adventure 2007, National Geographic Society, archived from the original on 2007-10-14
- Ward, A. E. (1887), The Sportsman's Guide to Kashmir & Ladak (3rd ed.), Calcutta Central Press Co.
- Wilson, Don; Reeder, DeeAnn, eds. (2005), Mammal Species of the World. A Taxonomic and Geographic Reference (3rd ed.), Johns Hopkins University Press
