= Taxkorgan Nature Reserve =

Nature reserve in Xinjiang, China

- Taxkorgan Natural Reserve
- IUCN category IV (habitat/species management area)
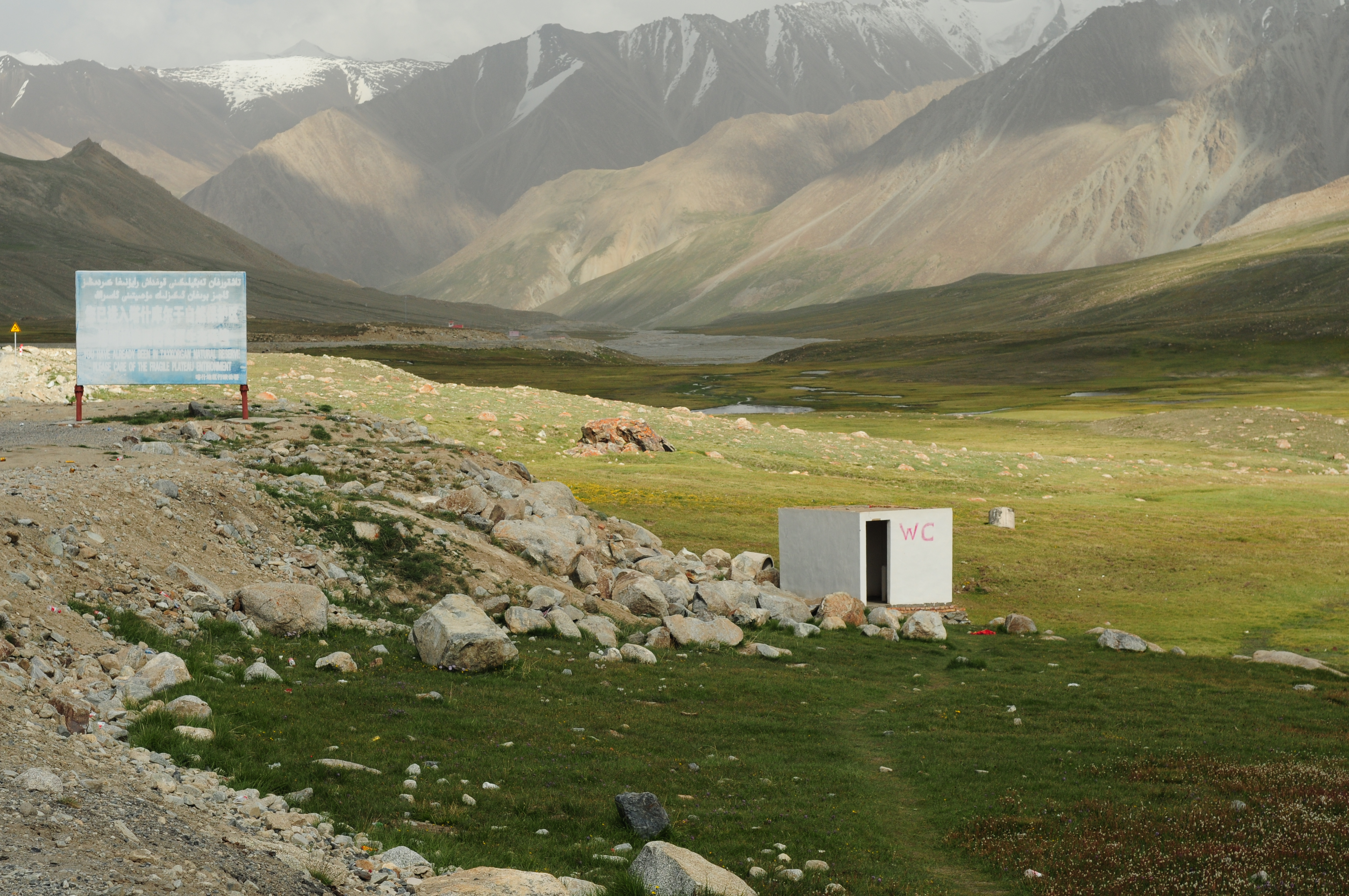

- Location within China
- Location: Xinjiang, China
- Nearest city: Taxkorgan
- Coordinates: 37°N 75.5°E
- Area: 14,000 km^{2} (5,400 mi^{2})
- Established: 1984
- Governing body: Kashgar Prefecture and State Forestry Administration of China

Taxkorgan Nature Reserve
- Traditional Chinese: 塔什庫爾幹野生動物自然保護區
- Simplified Chinese: 塔什库尔干野生动物自然保护区
- Literal meaning: Tashkurgan Wildlife Nature Reserve
Transcriptions
Standard Mandarin
- Hanyu Pinyin: tǎshénkù'ěrgàn yěshēng dòngwù zìrán bǎohù qū

The Taxkorgan Nature Reserve (officially spelled Taxkorgan Natural Reserve) is a nature reserve in Kashgar Prefecture, Xinjiang, China. It is situated around the Taghdumbash Pamir of Pamir Mountains and Karakorum Mountains. It covers about 14,000 square kilometres (5,400 sq mi) was established in 1984 mainly to protect the rare Marco Polo sheep and Tibetan argali. It has since also served to protect other species such as the snow leopard.

== Landscape and vegetation ==
The reserve is situated in westernmost China in the border area to Afghanistan, Tajikistan and Pakistan. It is also bordered by Khunjerab National Park in Pakistan and Wakhan National Park in Afghanistan. Half of its size is above 4,500 m and encompasses the northern edge of the Karakorum, the western edge of the Kunlun and the eastern offshoots of the Pamir mountains. To the south the reserve is bordering Khunjerab National Park in Pakistan. Most of the landscape is dominated by open, alpine vegetation. Trees are only present in some valleys below 3,400 m.

== Fauna ==
The reserve is home to three wild ungulate species. The most prominent is the Marco Polo sheep. In the 1980s there were about 150 of these large wild sheep in the reserve. Today, the population has increased to about 1,000 animals. The other two ungulate species are the Siberian ibex and the blue sheep. Another ungulate, which was present originally in the area is the kiang. Large predators are represented by snow leopard, wolf and brown bear. About 7,750 people with 70,000 domestic animals inhabit the reserve. The livestock has a strong impact on the reserve's vegetation.

During 2011–2013, the Tien Shan dholes (Cuon alpinus hesperius) have been spotted by the local people in the reserve.
