= Khunjerab National Park =

National park in Pakistan

- IUCN category II (national park)
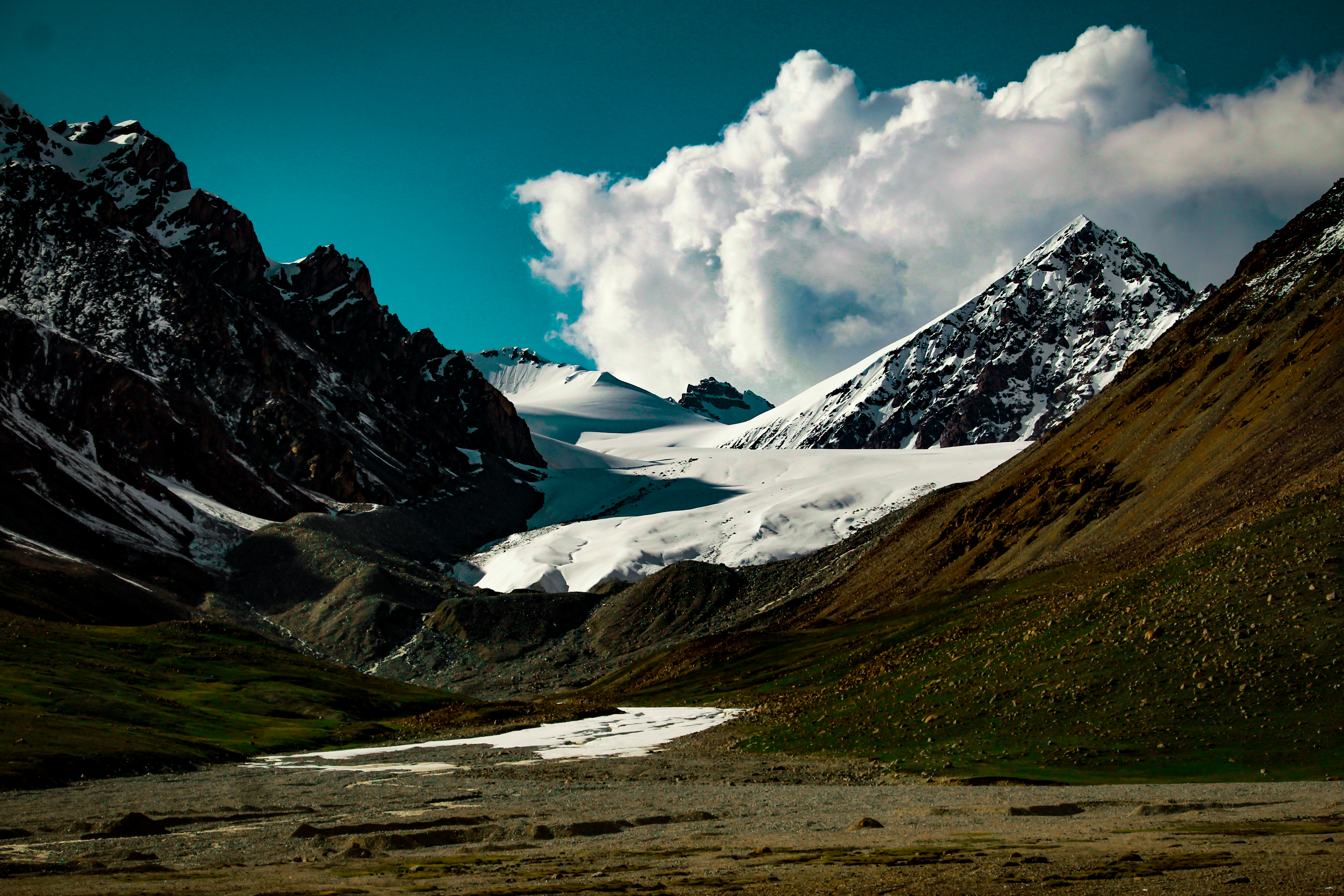
- Interactive map of Khunjerab National Park
- Location: Hunza District, Karakoram, Gilgit-Baltistan, Pakistan
- Coordinates: 36°35′13.21″N 75°23′59.5″E
- Area: 2,269.13 km^{2} (876.12 sq mi)
- Elevation: 17,000 ft (5,200 m)
- Established: 1975
- Visitors: 250000

Khunjerab National Park (Urdu: خنجراب نیشنل پارک) is a national park in Gilgit Baltistan, Pakistan. Khunjerab National Park is Pakistan's third largest national park, and is adjacent to the Taxkorgan Natural Reserve in China.

== Etymology ==
Khun means "blood" and jerav means "to stream" in Wakhi, the native language of the region.

== History ==
Khunjerab National Park was established primarily as a means to protect the Marco Polo sheep (as well as snow leopards and bharal) living in the area. The borders of the park were mapped by George Schaller of the Wildlife Conservation Society in 1974, after a short field survey. The park was formally established on 29 April 1975 by Prime Minister of Pakistan Zulfikar Ali Bhutto, who said that "it must become a world famous park".

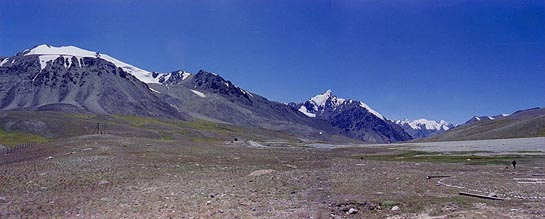
Khunjerab Pass is close to the national park's northwest corner

Despite being listed as a category 2 national park, banning human activities including agriculture and hunting, the park was poorly managed, meaning that illegal hunting of the Marco Polo sheep continued. Because of this, the International Union for Conservation of Nature commissioned Norwegian biologist Per Wegge to do a wildlife survey of the park in 1988. Wegge found that there was no evidence of competition between the domestic sheep being illegally grazed and the wild Marco Polo sheep, and that most of the illegal hunting was not being done by local Wakhi residents. He therefore proposed that the park be reclassified, allowing grazing and commercial hunting, with the profits going to local residents. However, the government overlooked Wegge's suggestions, instead drawing up a new management plan, which both the IUCN and the World Wildlife Fund supported as a means to preserve the park and protect the wildlife. Wegge was critical of the government scheme, claiming that it was based on financial considerations, with the Pakistani government hoping to attract tourists to the area. The IUCN agreed with this, and has since distanced itself from the national park. To help protect the animals from poaching, the WWF has created the Khunzerav Village Organization, which relies on people living in the area to report poaching or endangered animal sightings. This park was created on 29 April 1975 on the recommendation of wildlife biologist Dr. George Schaller. Over half of the park is above 4,000 m. Khunjerab Pass, the gateway to China via the Karakoram Highway, is at 4,934 m.

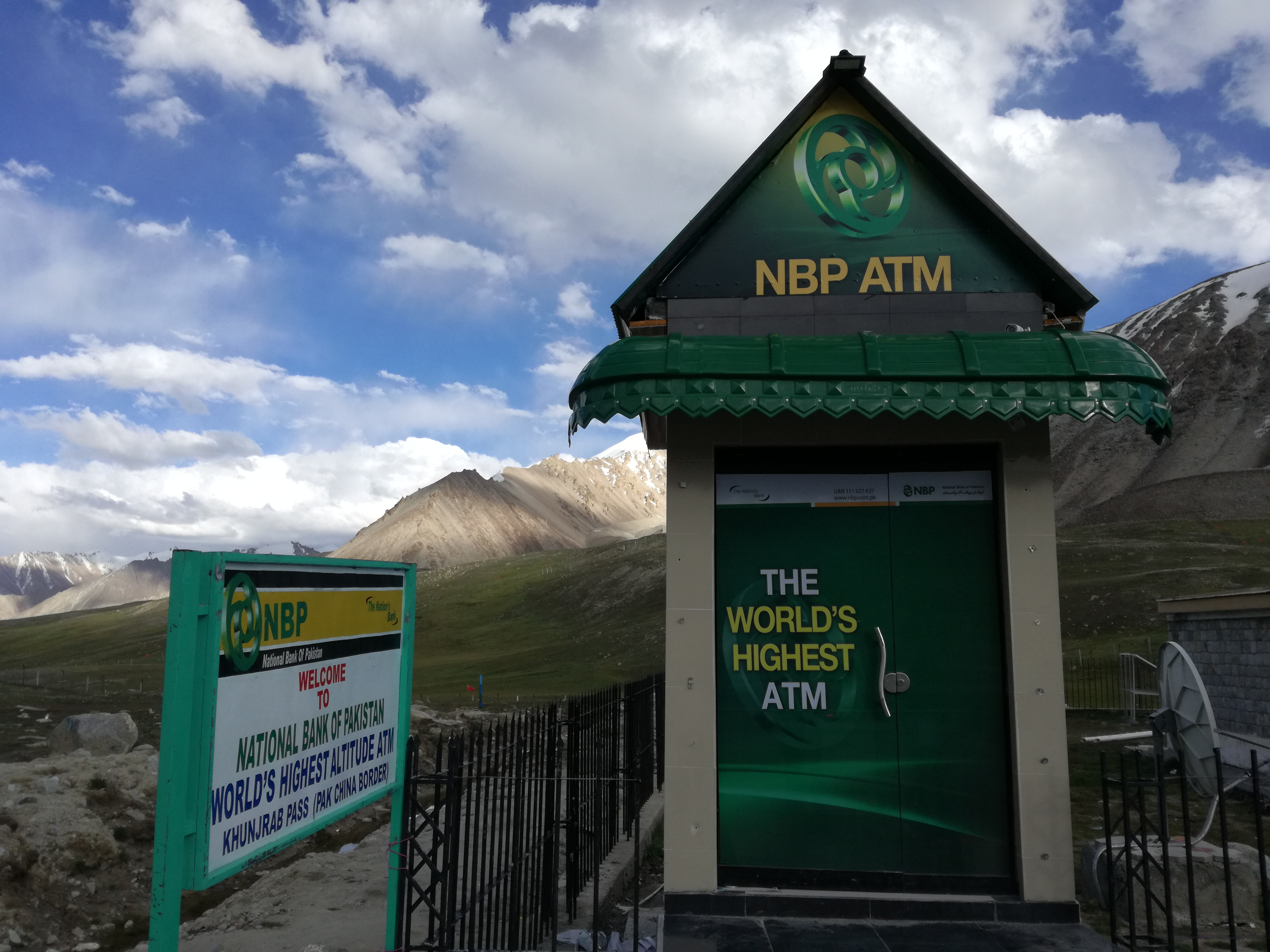
The world's highest ATM near the Khunjerab Pass installed by NBP, is situated in the park.

There is an ATM considered as the world's highest ATM at a height of 4,693 metres (15,397 ft) above sea level, installed by National Bank of Pakistan is located near the China-Pakistan border crossing at Khunjerab Pass.

== Wildlife ==
The primary purpose of this park was to provide protection to the endangered Marco Polo sheep, which is only found in this area in Pakistan. According to the Mir of Hunza, the population of sheep was around 400 but had dropped to below 180 by the time of the completion of the Karakoram Highway. A herd of almost 75 Marco Polo sheep was recorded in the spring of 1984 and park staff saw at least 50 crossing the pass in May 1989. In 2012, the population count was further down to 41, all being immigrant population from China.

The park is also home to snow leopards, containing one of their highest density in the Himalayan ecosystem, which is the natural habitat of these cats. Over 1,000 Siberian ibex, widely distributed in the park, are also present here. In Shimshal area, 1,692 blue sheep were counted in a 2025 survey by the Government of Gilgit-Baltistan.

Feral or semi-feral animals especially domestic yaks can be seen roaming in the park.

=== Mammals ===
Total species: 17. Mammals in the park include:

Name of animal	Scientific name	Status	Pictures
Common pipistrelle	Pipistrellus pipistrellus	Least concern	
Grey long-eared bat	Plecotus austriacus	Near Threatened	
Indian wolf	Canis lupus pallipes	Endangered	
Hill fox	Vulpes vulpes montana	Data Deficient	
Himalayan brown bear	Ursus arctos isabellinus	Critically Endangered	
Snow leopard	Panthera uncia	Critically Endangered	
Himalayan ibex	Capra sibirica	Near Threatened	
Bharal	Pseudois nayaur	Endangered (Shimshal area only)	
Marco Polo sheep	Ovis ammon polii	Critically Endangered	
Kiang	equus kiang	Least concern	
Cape hare	Lepus capensis	Vulnerable	
Large-eared pika	Ochotona macrotis	Least Concern	
Long-tailed marmot	Marmota caudata	Least Concern	
Kashmir field mouse	Apodemus rusiges	Least concern	
Grey dwarf hamster	Nothocricetulus migratorius	Least concern	

=== Birds ===
45 avian species are found in the Khunjerab National Park.

Name of bird	Scientific name	Pictures
Black Redstart	Phoenicurus ochruros	
White-capped redstart	Phoenicurus leucocephalus	
Güldenstädt's redstart	Phoenicurus erythrogastrus	
Blue whistling thrush	Myophonus caeruleus	
Blue rock thrush	Monticola solitarius	
Desert wheatear	Oenanthe deserti	
Red-fronted serin	Serinus pusillus	
Common rosefinch	Carpodacus erythrinus	
Great rosefinch	Carpodacus rubicilla	
Plain mountain finch	Leucosticte nemoricola	
Grey wagtail	Motacilla cinerea	
Masked wagtail	Motacilla alba personata	
Citrine wagtail	Motacilla citreola	
White wagtail	Motacilla alba	
Red-billed chough	Pyrrhocorax pyrrhocorax	
Alpine chough	Pyrrhocorax graculus	
Common raven	Corvus corax	
Eurasian golden oriole	Oriolus oriolus	
Lesser whitethroat	Curruca curruca	
Brown dipper	Cinclus pallasii	
Common chiffchaff	Phylloscopus collybita	
Greenish warbler	Phylloscopus trochiloides	
Horned lark	Eremophila alpestris	
House sparrow	Passer domesticus	
Rock bunting	Emberiza cia	
Wallcreeper	Tichodroma muraria	
Brown accentor	Prunella fulvescens	
Radde's accentor	Prunella ocularis	
Long-tailed shrike	Lanius schach	
White-eared bulbul	Pycnonotus leucotis	
Bearded vulture	Gypaetus barbatus	
Himalayan vulture	Gyps himalayensis	
Eurasian sparrowhawk	Accipiter nisus	
Common kestrel	Falco tinnunculus	
Golden eagle	Aquila chrysaetos	
Chukar partridge	Alectoris chukar	
Himalayan snowcock	Tetraogallus himalayensis	
Snow pigeon	Columba leuconota	
European turtle dove	Streptopelia turtur	
Common sandpiper	Actitis hypoleucos	
Little stint	Calidris minuta	
Common cuckoo	Cuculus canorus	
Common hawk-cuckoo	Hierococcyx varius	
Eurasian hoopoe	Upupa epops	
Common moorhen	Gallinula chloropus	

=== Reptiles ===
Two species of reptiles are found here:

Name of animal	Scientific name	Status	Pictures
Himalayan agama	Paralaudakia himalayana	Common	
Pakistani agama	Laudakia pakistanica	Common	

== See also ==
- Khunjerab Pass
- Northern Pakistan
