= Ovis orientalis =

Ovis orientalis (a species of wild sheep, Ovis) may refer to:

- the Ovis orientalis orientalis subspecies group, commonly known as mouflon,
- the Ovis orientalis vignei subspecies group, commonly known as urial.
