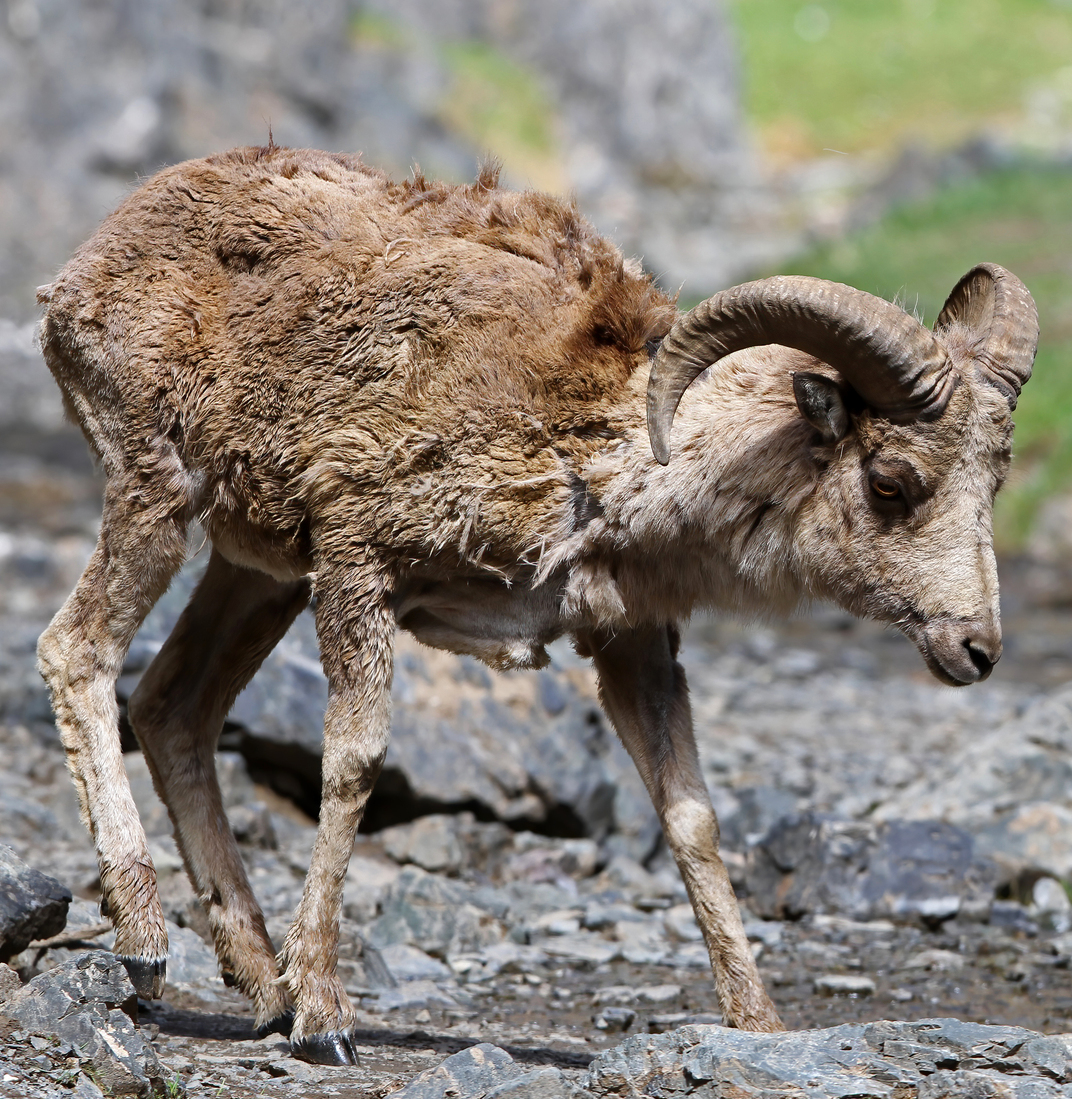
- A male argali in Mongolia

Conservation status
- Near Threatened (IUCN 3.1)
- CITES Appendix II

Scientific classification
- Kingdom: Animalia
- Phylum: Chordata
- Class: Mammalia
- Order: Artiodactyla
- Family: Bovidae
- Subfamily: Caprinae
- Genus: Ovis
- Species: O. ammon

Binomial name
- Ovis ammon (Linnaeus, 1758)
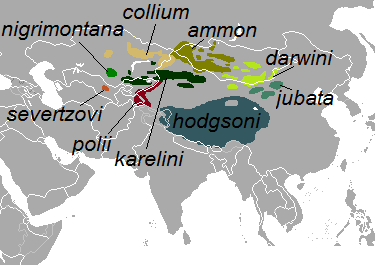
- Range of the argali subspecies

Synonyms
- Capra ammon Linnaeus, 1758

= Argali =

Species of sheep

The argali (Ovis ammon), also known as the mountain sheep, is the largest species of wild sheep. It is native to the highlands of western East Asia, the Himalayas, Tibet, and the Altai Mountains.

== Description ==
The name 'argali' is the Mongolian word for wild sheep. It is the largest species of wild sheep. Argali stand 85 to 135 cm (3 to 4 ft) high at the shoulder and measure 136 to 200 cm (4 to 7 ft) long from the head to the base of the tail. The female, or ewe is the smaller sex by a considerable margin, sometimes weighing less than half as much as the male, or ram. The ewes can weigh from 43.2 to 100 kg (95 to 220 lb) and the rams typically from 97 to 328 kg (214 to 723 lb), with a maximum reported mass of 356 kg (785 lb). The Pamir argali (also called Marco Polo sheep, for they were first described by that traveler), O. a. polii, is the largest race on average, regularly measuring more than 180 cm (5 ft 11 in) long without the tail, and is less sexually dimorphic in body mass than most other subspecies. The argali has relatively the shortest tail of any wild goat-antelope or sheep, with reported tail lengths of 9.5–17 cm (3.7–6.7 in).

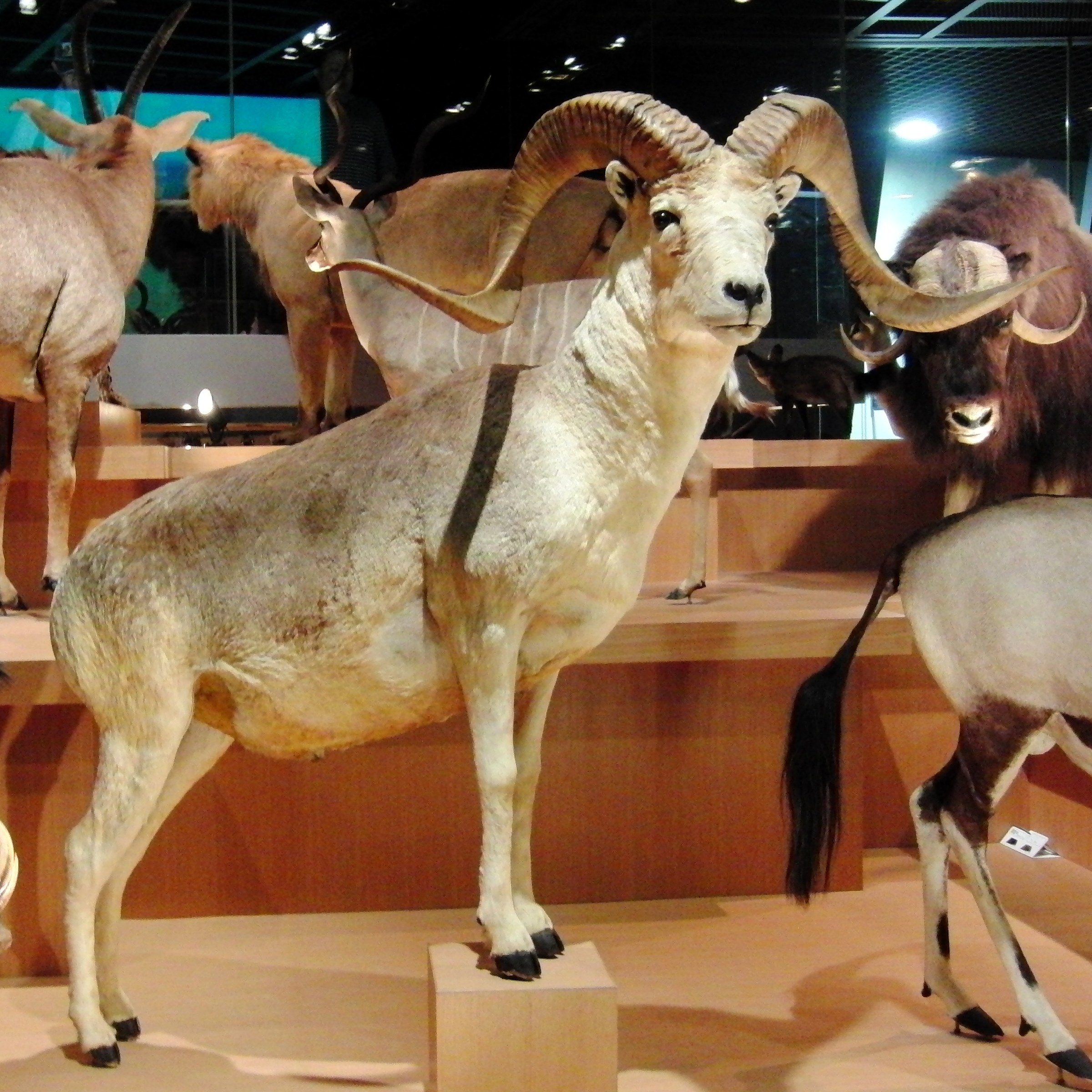
Stuffed specimen at the National Museum of Nature and Science, Tokyo.

The general coloration varies between each animal, from a light yellow to a reddish-brown to a dark grey-brown. Argali or nyan from the Himalayas are usually relatively dark, whereas those from Russian ranges are often relatively pale. In summertime, the coat is often lightly spotted with a salt-and-pepper pattern. The back is darker than the sides, which gradually lighten in color. The face, tail and the buttocks are yellowish-white. The male has a whitish neck ruff and a dorsal crest and is usually slightly darker in color than the female. Males have two large corkscrew shaped horns, some measuring 190 cm (6 ft 3 in) in total length and weighing up to 23 kg (51 lb). Males use their horns for competing with one another. Females also carry horns, but they are much smaller, usually measuring less than 60 cm (24 in) in total length.

== Taxonomy ==
Currently, nine argali subspecies are recognized:

- Altai argali (O. a. ammon) occurs in the Altai Mountains of western Mongolia; its range extends marginally north into the Gorno-Altai and Tuva republics of Siberian Russia, extreme northeast Kazakhstan, and southwest into Xinjiang, China.
- Karaganda argali (O. a. collium) inhabits the Karaganda Region of east and central Kazakhstan.
- Gobi argali (O. a. darwini) lives in northern China and southern Mongolia.
- Tibetan argali (O. a. hodgsoni) occurs across India, Nepal, Bhutan and China.
- North China argali (O. a. jubata) is restricted to northeast China.
- Tian Shan argali (O. a. karelini) inhabits the Tian Shan of eastern Kyrgyzstan.
- Kara Tau argali (O. a. nigrimontana) inhabits the Karatau Mountains of Kazakhstan.
- Marco Polo sheep (O. a. polii) inhabits Afghanistan, China, Kyrgyzstan, Pakistan and Tajikistan.
- Severtzov argali (O. a. severtzovi) lives in Kyrgyzstan, Tajikistan and Uzbekistan.
- †Ovis a. antiqua lived in western, southern, and eastern Europe until the late Middle Pleistocene.

Genetic analysis of mtDNA of several argali subspecies has shown that the Altai and Gobi argalis grouped closely with the urial subspecies O. vignei bochariensis, while the Karaganda and Kara Tau argalis grouped with the urial subspecies O. vignei arkal.

A paleosubspecies, Ovis ammon antiqua, is known from Middle Pleistocene Europe. Fossils have been found from Portugal to Georgia, including from human-made butchery sites.

Marco Polo sheep and local domestic sheep producing viable hybrids that mature to be fertile has been documented. Each of these hybrids exhibited heterotic effects even while some were aneuploid with an odd number of chromosomes.

== Distribution and habitat ==
Argali range from central Kazakhstan in the west to the Shanxi Province in China in the east and from the Altai Mountains in the north to the Himalayas to the south. They are a species of mountainous areas, living from elevations of 300 to 5,800 m (980 to 19,030 ft). In protected areas, the species generally prefers gently sloping areas with soft broken terrain, although ewes with lambs often take up residence in more precipitous areas, characterized by canyons and jagged rocks. In areas where they are extensively hunted (such as Kazakhstan), they are more likely to be found in forested areas. In parts of China and Russia where they compete for resources with numerous domestic stock, argali more regularly take up residence in precipitous, jagged areas. Argali may search for regions in the mountains where snow cover is not heavy during the winter, following winds that blow snow off the earth. Rams are generally found at higher elevations more regularly than females and stay at higher elevations longer during the winter.

== Behaviour and ecology ==
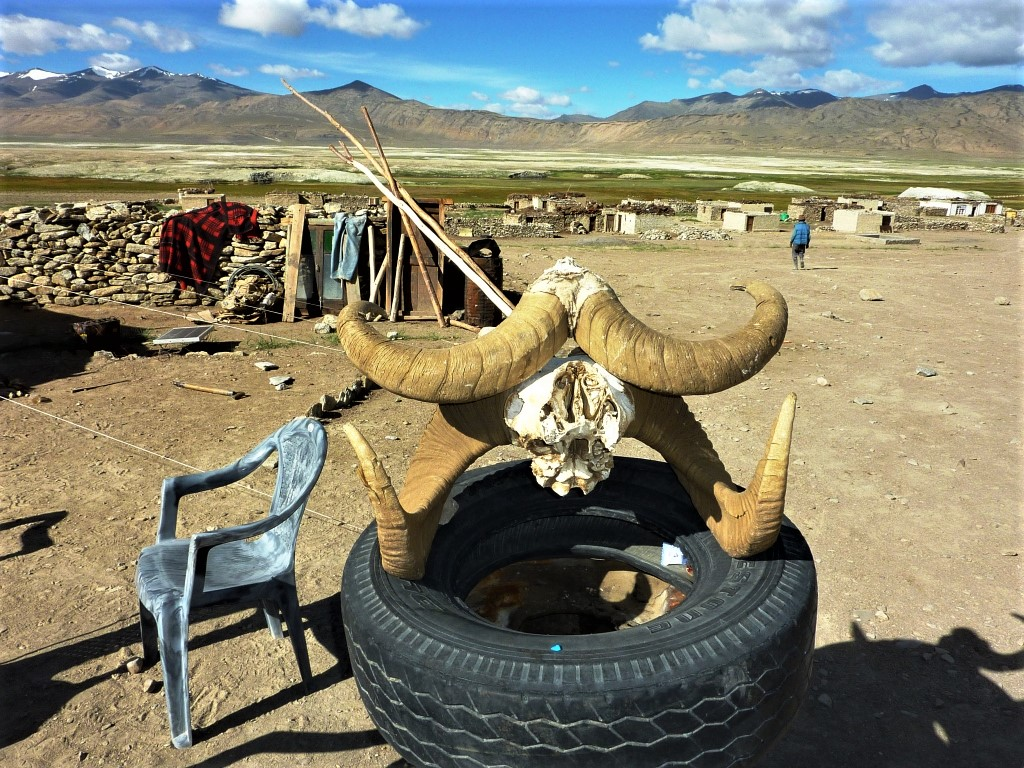
Argali horns outside temporary roadside cafe, Changtang, Ladakh

Argalis live in herds typically numbering between two and 150 animals, segregated by sex, except during breeding season. Most populations show large numbers of adult females, constituting more than half of a local population, against around 20% adult males and a further 20% young argali. Some rams are solitary, but most are seen in small herds numbering between three and 30 individuals. Females and their young live in larger groups, regularly up to 92 individuals and exceptionally to 200 animals. Migrating herds, especially males, have been reported. Most migration appear to be related to seasonally decreased food sources, though an overabundance of biting insects, especially horseflies, severe drought or fires, poaching by humans, and large numbers of domestic livestock may also trigger movements. With their long legs, herds can travel quickly from place to place. Argali tend to live at higher elevations during the summer.

Argali reach breeding maturity at two to three years of age. Rutting may occur from October to mid-January, generally lasting longer in lower elevations. In rutting herds, both rams and ewes attack others of their own sex, exerting dominance by ramming each other with their horns. Although such groups engage in lamb-like play, the combat of a pair of mature males is a serious business. The rams slam into each other, with their fore legs up in the air, exerting enough force to be heard up to 800 m (2,600 ft) away. Often, the older males (over six years of age), which are also often the largest, end up the dominant ones and younger males are chased off once the ewes are in estrus. Once dominance is established, the top rams begin approaching ewes and smell their urine to determine their receptiveness. The ram then repeatedly approaches the ewe and forcibly mounts her. Mating commences around two to three weeks after the rutting begins. Rams may remain in the company of ewes for up to two months after the rutting period is complete.

The gestation period lasts a little over 165 days. Births occur in late March or April, with a variable number of females being barren. Most subspecies give birth to a single lamb, though in some races, twins are not uncommon and even as many as five have been born at once. At birth, the lambs weigh 2.7–4.6 kg (6.0–10.1 lb). The newborn lamb and mother ewe stay around where the birth occurs overnight and, on the next day, both usually walk together. Lambs often play in groups, jumping up and down together, sometimes being joined by their mothers. Weight gain is often quite fast and the lambs may weigh 10 times their birth weight by their first birthday. Females often attain their maximum mass by two years of age, but males appear to continue to grow larger and heavier in their third and fourth years. Milk teeth develop around three months of age, with a full set of teeth developing by around six months. By the time their teeth develop, lambs are capable grazers, but the ewes continue nursing them from August to May of the following year. Most argali live five to 10 years, but are capable of living 13 years in the wild.

Adult argali eat 16–19 kg (35–42 lb) of food a day. The vegetation preferred by the species varies based on elevation and area. In higher elevations, they predominantly eat grasses, sedges, and forbs. At midelevation habitats, they more regularly feed on bushes and mesophyte grasses. In the lowest ranges and the spurs of deserts, grasses and sedges again predominate, but often of different species than the high-elevation ones. In north-central Kazakhstan, sprouts, leaves, flowers, and fruits are significant to the diet all year, whereas they appear to be a rare dietary supplement over the rest of the range. Water is needed by argali, which is rarely a problem for animals living at high elevation, where melting snow and small waterways are regularly encountered. In drier climes, argali may travel several kilometers in search of water. When available, argali readily consume saline soil.

== Genetics ==
Tibetan Sheep have a significantly higher genetic diversity than lower altitude sheep breeds. Genes encoding for adaptation to high altitudes air conditions including HDAC5, BMP2, and BMPR1B show higher selection due to the lower oxygen concentrations.

Despite living in high altitude and isolated terrain, they do not exist and evolve as a genetic isolate, due to the many subspecies and interbreeding. This quality can be used to broaden the genetic diversity of domesticated Tibetan Sheep due to a higher likelihood in viable and fertile offspring.

== Preformers ==
Although they are locally sympatric with Siberian ibex, the two species have differing habitat and pasture preferences, reducing likely competition. In Tibet, the argali must regularly compete with other grazing species for pasture, including Tibetan antelope, bharal, Thorold's deer and wild yaks. Competition is most serious with livestock, especially domestic yaks and domestic sheep, with which argali are frequently forced to intermingle and from which they often catch diseases and parasites. The main predators of argali are Himalayan wolves, which often exploit harsh winter conditions (such as deep snow) to capture the wild sheep, though they can and do take specimens of any age or condition year around. Snow leopards and leopards are also predators of argali of any age. Eurasian lynx and wolverines may seldom kill argali to at least the size of winter-weakened ewes. Red foxes and domestic dogs (largely those kept by sheep-herders) will prey on lambs. Cinereous vultures, lammergeiers and golden eagles have been observed circling herds of ewes with lambs in a possibly predatory manner and remains of argali lambs have been observed in golden eagle nests. Smaller predators, such as raptorial birds and smaller mammalian carnivores, are attacked by mother ewes, but in the presence of larger predators, the ewes quickly run away with the lambs following them.

== Conservation ==
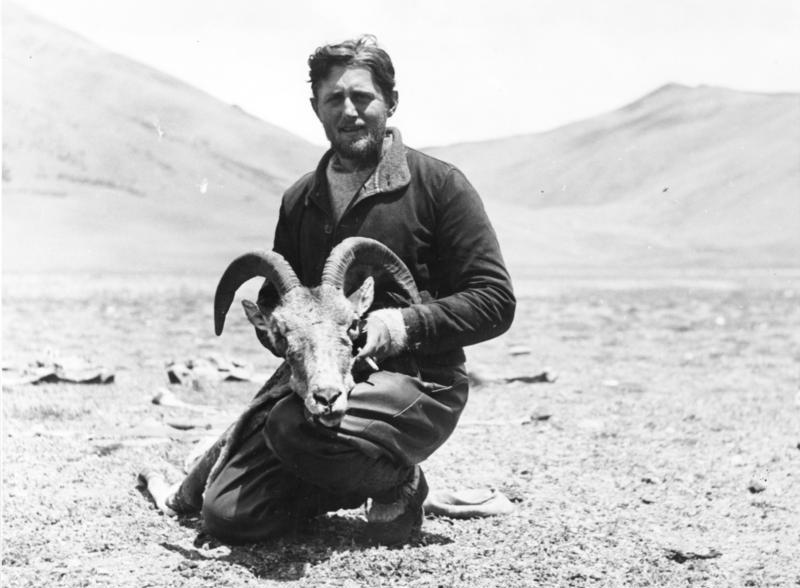
Edmund Geer during the 1938–1939 German expedition to Tibet

The argali is listed as Near Threatened on the IUCN Red List. It is hunted for its meat and horns, which are used in traditional Chinese medicine, and poaching continues to be a major threat. It has been extirpated in northeastern China, southern Siberia and parts of Mongolia.

In Azad Jammu and Kashmir, it is listed as an endangered species.

Findings in the mitochondrial genome relationship and the development of interspecies nuclear transfer embryos between argali and sheep could help in conserving the species in the long run.
