= Punjab urial =

- A Punjab urial at Kallar Kahar

Scientific classification
- Kingdom: Animalia
- Phylum: Chordata
- Class: Mammalia
- Infraclass: Placentalia
- Order: Artiodactyla
- Family: Bovidae
- Subfamily: Caprinae
- Genus: Ovis
- Species: O. vignei
- Subspecies: O. v. punjabiensis

Trinomial name
- Ovis vignei punjabiensis Lydekker, 1913

Subspecies of urial

The Punjab urial (Ovis vignei punjabiensis) is a subspecies of urial (wild sheep) that is endemic to northern Punjab, Pakistan, primarily the Kala Chitta Range and Salt Range between Indus and Jhelum rivers.

Punjab urial is classified as vulnerable by IUCN due to the threat of poaching and hunting. A 2024–25 survey estimated 532 Punjab urials at Kalabagh Game Reserve with an average density of 8.9 animals/km sq. An earlier survey in 2021 estimated 3,484 Punjab urials in the wider area of 7,953 km^{2} (3,071 sq mi), with an average density of 0.4 animals/km sq.
