= George Schaller =

American naturalist (born 1933)

George Beals Schaller
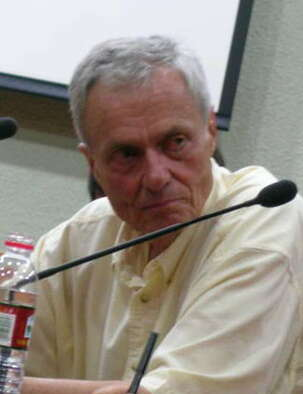
- Schaller at a 2005 lecture in the Beijing Zoo
- Born: May 26, 1933 (age 93); Berlin, Nazi Germany
- Education: University of Alaska; University of Wisconsin–Madison
- Known for: Mountain gorilla conservation
- Awards: • National Geographic Lifetime Achievement Award; • Guggenheim Fellowship; • World Wildlife Fund Gold Medal; • International Cosmos Prize (1996); • Tyler Prize for Environmental Achievement; • National Book Award; • Indianapolis Prize
- Scientific career
- Fields: Biologist, conservationist
- Workplaces: Panthera, Wildlife Conservation Society

George Beals Schaller (born May 26, 1933) is an American mammalogist, biologist, conservationist and author. Schaller is recognized by many as the world's preeminent field biologist, studying wildlife throughout Africa, Asia and South America. Born in Berlin, Schaller grew up in Germany, but moved to Missouri as a teen. He is vice president of Panthera Corporation and serves as chairman of their Cat Advisory Council. Schaller is also a senior conservationist at the Bronx Zoo-based Wildlife Conservation Society.

== Early life ==
Schaller was born in Berlin, Germany. He received his Bachelor of Biological Science degree from the University of Alaska in 1955, and went on to the University of Wisconsin–Madison to obtain his PhD in 1962. From 1962 to 1963, he was a fellow at the Behavioral Sciences department of Stanford University. From 1963 to 1966, Schaller served as research associate for the Johns Hopkins University pathobiology department, and from 1966 to 1972, served as the Rockefeller University's and New York Zoological Society's research associate in research and animal behavior as part of the Institute for Research in Animal Behavior. From 1972 to 1979, he served as coordinator of the Center for Field Biology and Conservation, which replaced the IRAB. He then served as director of the New York Zoological Society's International Conservation Program from 1979 to 1988.

== Mountain gorilla research ==
In 1959, when Schaller was 26, he traveled to Central Africa to study and live with the mountain gorillas (Gorilla beringei beringei) of the Virunga Volcanoes. Little was known about the life of gorillas in the wild until the publication of The Mountain Gorilla: Ecology and Behavior in 1963, that first conveyed to the general public just how profoundly intelligent and gentle gorillas really are, contrary to then-common beliefs. Schaller also, in 1964, recounted this epic two-year study in The Year of the Gorilla, which also provides a broader historical perspective on the efforts to save one of humankind's nearest relatives from the brink of extinction.

The American zoologist Dian Fossey, with assistance from the National Geographic Society and Louis Leakey, followed Schaller's ground-breaking field research on mountain gorillas in the Virungas. Schaller and Fossey were instrumental in dispelling the public perception of gorillas as brutes, by demonstrably establishing the deep compassion and social intelligence evident among gorillas, and how very closely their behavior parallels that of humans.

No one who looks into a gorilla's eyes – intelligent, gentle, vulnerable – can remain unchanged, for the gap between ape and human vanishes; we know that the gorilla still lives within us. Do gorillas also recognize this ancient connection?

== Conservation career ==
In 1963-1964, Schaller and his wife were in Kanha National Park, India where they studied tigers. In 1966, Schaller and his wife traveled to Tanzania to live in the Serengeti, and Schaller conducted one of the first studies of social behavior and movement of Africa's big cats. Schaller appeared as himself on the December 6, 1965 episode of the CBS gameshow To Tell the Truth.

In his 1972 work The Tree Where Man Was Born, author Peter Matthiessen described Schaller as "single-minded, not easy to know". Matthiessen went on to say Schaller was "a stern pragmatist" who "takes a hard-eyed look at almost everything", "lean and intent", and in 1978's The Snow Leopard Matthiessen wrote that by that time, some considered Schaller the world's finest field biologist.

In the fall of 1973, Schaller went to the remote Himalayan region of Dolpo, an area of Nepal occupied by people of the Tibetan culture and ethnicity. Schaller was there to study the Himalayan Bharal, (blue sheep), and possibly glimpse the elusive snow leopard, an animal rarely spotted in the wild. Schaller is one of only two Westerners known to have seen a snow leopard in Nepal between 1950 and 1978. Accompanying him on the trip was Matthiessen, and as a result of the trip, Matthiessen wrote The Snow Leopard, (1978) detailing the accounts of their travels and research, which won two U.S. National Book Awards. Schaller is referred to throughout the book as "GS".

In the late 1970s, Schaller spent time in Brazil studying the jaguar, capybara, "alligator" (caiman), and other animals of the region.

In 1980, as part of a cooperative project between the World Wildlife Fund (WWF) and China, Schaller carried out field research on the giant panda in the Wolong Nature Reserve in Sichuan Province. He was the first Westerner to do so since before the founding of the People's Republic of China in 1949, and he co-authored the resulting monograph, The Giant Pandas of Wolong. Schaller sought to refute the notion that the panda population was declining due to natural bamboo die-offs. Instead, Schaller found the panda's popularity was leading to its frequent capture, and was the biggest threat to the population. Schaller also found evidence that pandas were originally carnivores, but underwent an evolutionary change to accommodate a diet of bamboo, which is difficult to digest, reducing competition with other animals for food. Since Schaller's research, the panda population has increased in the wild by 45 percent. During his time in China, Schaller would hand out cards to wildlife hunters that read: "All beings tremble at punishment, to all, life is dear. Comparing others to oneself, one should neither kill nor cause to kill." Schaller has spent more time in China than he has spent at his home in Connecticut. In 1993, Schaller wrote The Last Panda, a meditation not only on the fate of the species but on the politics of conservation more broadly.

In 1988, Schaller and his wife traveled to China's Chang Tang (Qiang Tang) region to study the Tibetan antelope, or chiru, and became one of the first westerners permitted to enter the remote region.

In 1994, Schaller and Dr. Alan Rabinowitz were the first scientists to uncover the rare saola, a forest-dwelling bovine in Laos. Later that year, Schaller rediscovered the Vietnamese warty pig, once thought extinct. In 1996, he located a herd of Tibetan red deer, also thought extinct.

In 2003, Schaller returned to Chang Tang, and found the wildlife in the area had rebounded since his first trip to the region. Most significantly, the wild yak population, which was estimated at only 13 individuals, had grown to over 187. "The Tibet Forestry Department has obviously made a dedicated and successful effort in protecting the wildlife." Schaller wrote in a letter to the World Wildlife Fund's Dawa Cering. While in Tibet, Schaller worked on researching the rare Tibetan antelope, or chiru, whose population declined due to trophy hunting for their exotic wool. Working with Tibetan authorities, and the Liz Claiborne and Art Ortenberg Foundation, Schaller helped protect the breeding and calving grounds of the chiru in the Kunlun mountains of Xinjiang Province.

In 2007, Schaller worked with Pakistan, Afghanistan, Tajikistan, and China to develop a new "Peace Park", that would protect 20,000 miles (32,000 km) of habitat for the largest wild sheep species, the Marco Polo sheep. In danger due to their impressive spiral horns, which can measure up to 6 feet (1.8 m) in length, the sheep is sought out as a trophy by international hunters. Schaller's research in the Pamir Mountains will play an important role in the park's creation.

== Conservation results ==
Schaller's work in conservation has resulted in the protection of large stretches of area in the Amazon, Brazil, the Hindu Kush in Pakistan, and forests in Southeast Asia. Due in part to Schaller's work, over 20 parks or preserves worldwide have been established, including Alaska's Arctic National Wildlife Refuge (ANWR), the Shey-Phoksundo National Park in Nepal, and the Changtang Nature Reserve, one of the world's most significant wildlife refuges. At over 200,000 miles (320,000 km), the Chang Tang Nature Reserve is triple the size of America's largest wildlife refuge, and was called "One of the most ambitious attempts to arrest the shrinkage of natural ecosystems", by The New York Times.

== Bigfoot research ==
Schaller is one of a few prominent scientists who argue that Bigfoot reports are worthy of serious study. A 2003 Los Angeles Times story described Schaller as a "Bigfoot skeptic", but he also expressed disapproval for other scientists who do not examine evidence, yet "write [Bigfoot] off as a hoax or myth. I don't think that's fair." In a 2003 Denver Post article Schaller said that he is troubled that no Bigfoot remains have ever been uncovered, and no feces samples have been found to allow DNA testing. Schaller notes: "There have been so many sightings over the years, even if you throw out 95 percent of them, there ought to be some explanation for the rest. I think a hard-eyed look is absolutely essential".

== Publications ==
Schaller has written more than fifteen books on African and Asian mammals, including Serengeti Lion: A Study of Predator–Prey Relations, The Last Panda, and Tibet's Hidden Wilderness, Tibet the Wild, based on his own studies, and supported by long-term observations of species in their natural habitats. Schaller has also written hundreds of magazine articles, and dozens of books and scientific articles about tigers, jaguars, cheetahs and leopards, as well as wild sheep and goats, rhinoceroses, and flamingos. Over more than five decades, Schaller's field research has helped shape wildlife protection efforts around the world.

== Awards and recognition ==
Schaller's conservation honors include National Geographic's Lifetime Achievement Award, a Guggenheim Fellowship, and the World Wildlife Fund's Gold Medal for: "Contributions to the understanding and conservation of endangered species". Schaller has also been awarded the International Cosmos Prize, the Tyler Prize for Environmental Achievement, and he was the first recipient of the Wildlife Conservation Society's Beebe Fellowship. Schaller's literary honors include the U.S. National Book Award in Science (for The Serengeti Lion in 1973). In 1988, Schaller received the Golden Plate Award of the American Academy of Achievement. In September 2008, he received the Indianapolis Prize for his work in animal conservation.

In 2017, a newly discovered species of scorpion was named as Liocheles schalleri in his honor.

== Personal life ==
His wife Kay majored in Anthropology at the University of Alaska in Fairbanks, where she and Schaller met. They married in 1957 and Kay assisted in fieldwork and edited and typed his manuscripts for nearly seven decades. Kay Schaller died on March 7, 2023 at the age of 93.

The couple had two sons.

== Bibliography ==
- Schaller, George B. (1963). The Mountain Gorilla – Ecology and Behavior. University of Chicago Press. ISBN 978-0-226-73635-8.
- ————— (2010) [1964]. The Year of the Gorilla. Chicago: University of Chicago Press. ISBN 978-0-226-73647-1.
- ————— (1967). The Deer and the Tiger. Chicago: University of Chicago Press. 370 pages ISBN 0-226-73633-4.
- —————; Selsam, Millicent E. (1969). The Tiger: Its Life in the Wild. New York: Harper & Row. ISBN 9780065160703.
- ————— (1972). Serengeti: A Kingdom of Predators. New York: Alfred A. Knopf. ISBN 0-394-47242-X.
- ————— (1972). Mountain Monarchs: Wild Sheep and Goats of the Himalaya. Chicago: University of Chicago Press. p. 472 pages. ISBN 0-226-73641-5.
- ————— (1972). The Serengeti Lion: A Study of Predator-Prey Relations. Chicago: University of Chicago Press. p. 494 pages. ISBN 0-226-73640-7.
- ————— (1973). Golden Shadows, Flying Hooves. New York: Alfred A. Knopf. p. 287 pages. ISBN 0-394-47243-8.
- —————; Schaller, Kay (1977). Wonders of Lions. New York: Putnam Publishing Group Library. p. 304. ISBN 0-396-07409-X.
- ————— (1980). Stones of Silence: Journeys in the Himalaya. London: Andre Deutsch. p. 292 pages. ISBN 0-233-97215-3.
- —————; Jinchu, Hu; Wenshi, Pan; Jing, Zhu (1985). The Giant Pandas of Wolong. Chicago: Univ. of Chicago Press. ISBN 0-226-73643-1.
- ————— (1993). The Last Panda. Chicago: University of Chicago Press. p. 312 pages. ISBN 0-226-73628-8.
- ————— (1997). Tibet's Hidden Wilderness: Wildlife and Nomads of the Chang Tang Reserve. New York: Harry N. Abrams. p. 168 pages. ISBN 0-8109-3893-6.
- ————— (1998). Wildlife of the Tibetan Steppe. Chicago: University of Chicago Press. p. 383 pages. ISBN 0-226-73653-9.
- —————; Vrba, Elisabeth S., eds. (2000). Antelopes, Deer, and Relatives: Fossil Record, Behavioral Ecology, Systematics, and Conservation. New Haven, Conn: Yale University Press. p. 356 pages. ISBN 0-300-08142-1.
- ————— (2007). A Naturalist and Other Beasts: Tales From a Life in the Field. San Francisco, Calif: Sierra Club Books. p. 272 pages. ISBN 978-1-57805-129-8.
- ————— (2012). Tibet Wild: A Naturalist's Journeys on the Roof of the World. Washington, DC: Island Books. ISBN 978-1-61091-172-6.
- Schaller, George B. (2014). Deki: The Adventures of a Dog and a Boy in Tibet. Gurgaon: Hachette India. ISBN 9789350098479.
- Schaller, George B. (2020). Into Wild Mongolia. Yale University Press. ISBN 9780300246179.

== See also ==
- Biruté Galdikas
- Jane Goodall
- Dawn Prince-Hughes
- Dian Fossey
- Wildlife Conservation International
- Virunga National Park
