= Ovis gracilis =

Ovis gracilis Temporal range: Early Pleistocene

Scientific classification
- Domain: Eukaryota
- Kingdom: Animalia
- Phylum: Chordata
- Class: Mammalia
- Order: Artiodactyla
- Family: Bovidae
- Subfamily: Caprinae
- Tribe: Caprini
- Genus: Ovis
- Species: †O. gracilis

Binomial name
- †Ovis gracilis Vislobokova, 2023

Extinct species of mammal

Ovis gracilis is an extinct species of Ovis that inhabited the Crimean Peninsula during the Early Pleistocene.
