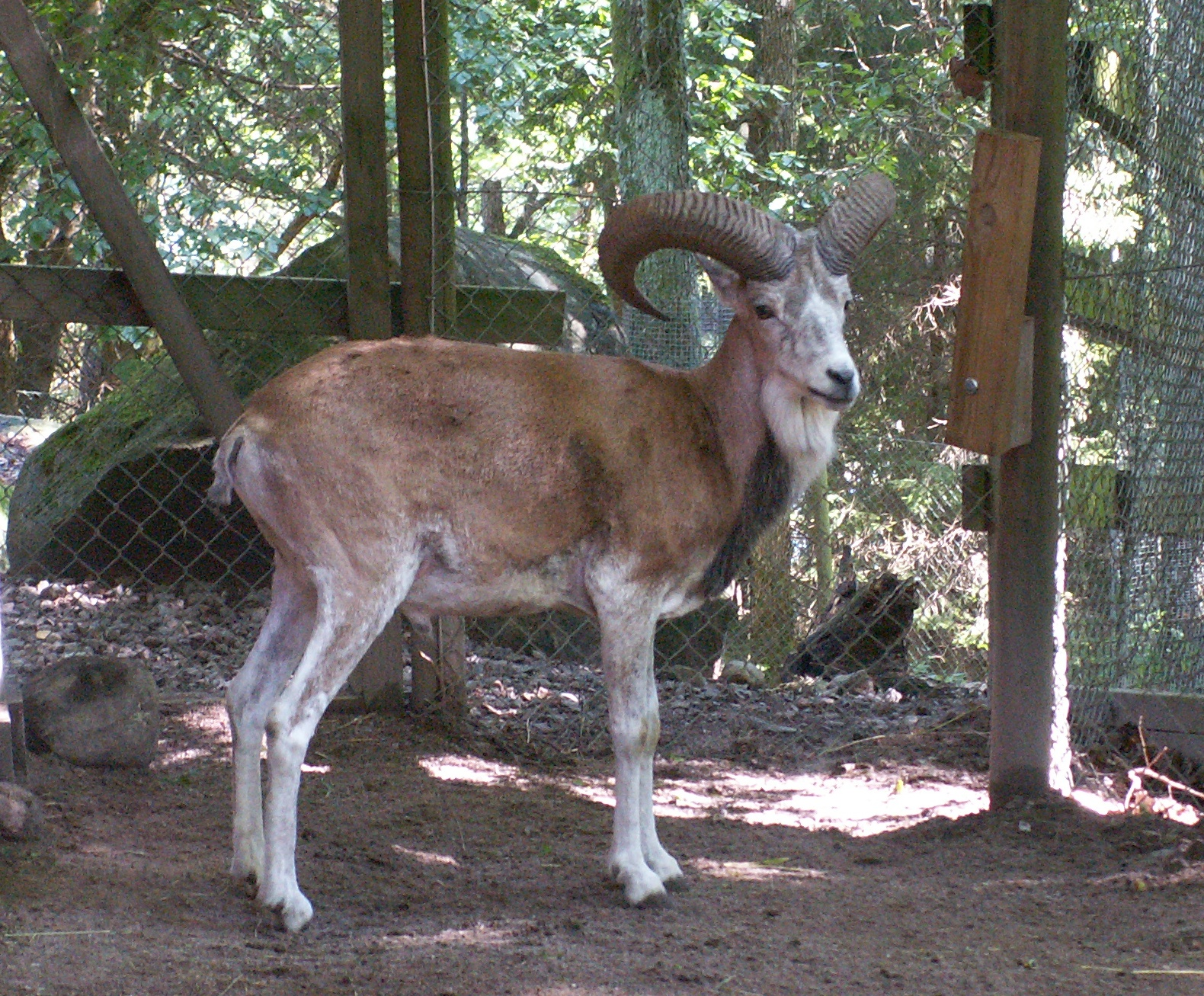
- Bukhara urial (Ovis vignei bochariensis) at Nordens Ark, Sweden

Conservation status
- Vulnerable (IUCN 3.1)
- CITES Appendix I

Scientific classification
- Kingdom: Animalia
- Phylum: Chordata
- Class: Mammalia
- Order: Artiodactyla
- Family: Bovidae
- Subfamily: Caprinae
- Genus: Ovis
- Species: O. vignei

Binomial name
- Ovis vignei (Blyth, 1841)
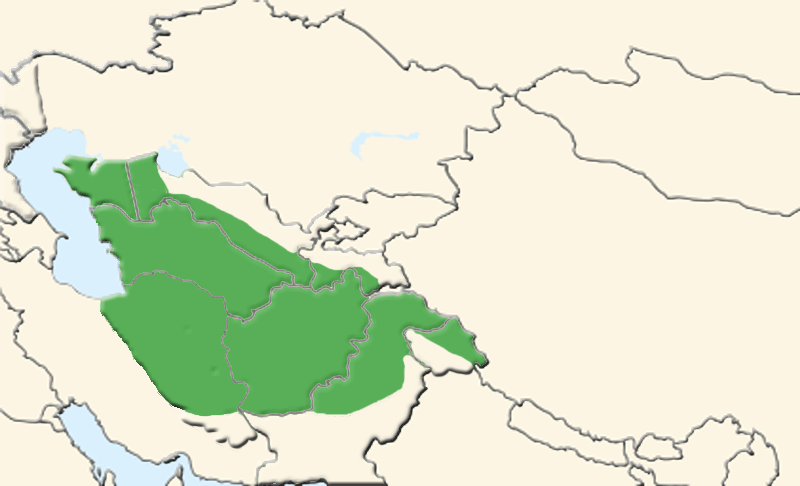
- The range of Urial

Synonyms
- Ovis orientalis vignei

= Urial =

Species of mammal

The urial (/ˈʊəriəl/ OOR-ee-əl; Ovis vignei), also known as arkars, shapo, or shapu, is a wild sheep native to Central and South Asia. It is listed as Vulnerable on the IUCN Red List.

== Taxonomy ==
Ovis vignei was the scientific name proposed by Edward Blyth in 1841 for wild sheep in the Sulaiman Mountains. The specific name honours Godfrey Vigne (1801–1863).

The vignei subspecies group consists of six individual subspecies:

- Ladakh urial (Ovis vignei vignei): northern India (Ladakh), northern Pakistan (Gilgit-Baltistan)
- Transcaspian urial (Ovis vignei arkal): Ustjurt-Plateau (Turkmenistan, Uzbekistan, northern Iran) and western Kazakhstan
- Blanford's urial or Baluchistan urial (Ovis vignei blanfordi): Pakistan (Balochistan)
- Bukhara urial (Ovis vignei bochariensis): Uzbekistan, Tajikistan, Turkmenistan, Afghanistan
- Afghan urial or Turkmenian sheep (Ovis vignei cycloceros): southern Turkmenistan, eastern Iran, Afghanistan, Pakistan (north Balochistan)
- Punjab urial (Ovis vignei punjabiensis): Pakistan (Punjab)

== Characteristics ==
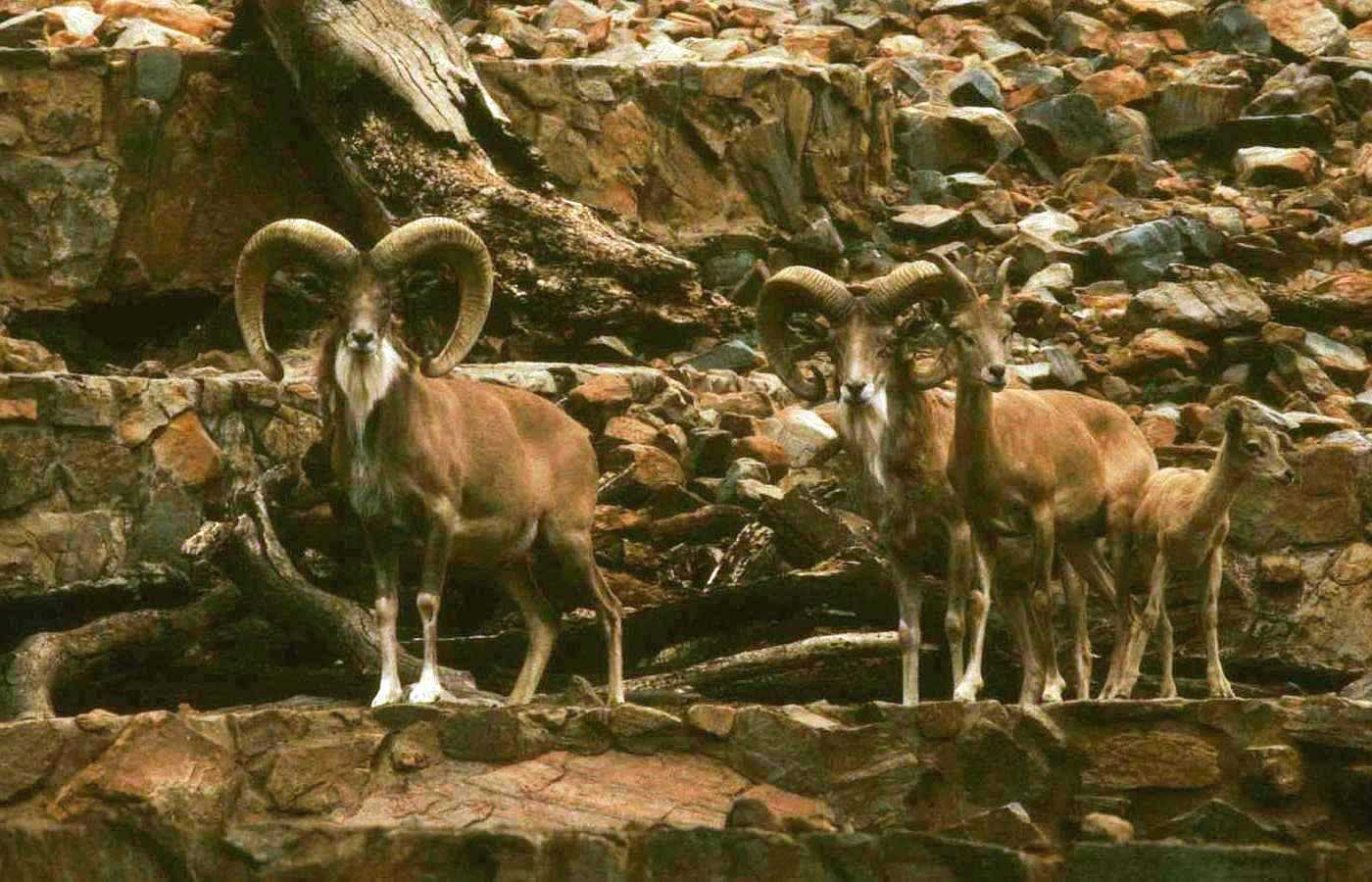
Transcaspian arkals (O. v. arkal) at Pretoria Zoo

Urial males have large horns, curling outwards from the top of the head turning in to end somewhere behind the head; females have shorter, compressed horns. The horns of the males are up to 100 cm (39 in) long. The shoulder height of an adult male urial is between 80 and 90 cm (31 and 35 in).

== Distribution and habitat ==
The urial is native to montane areas in the Pamir Mountains, Hindu Kush and Himalayas up to an elevation of 4,500 m (14,800 ft). It is distributed from northeastern Iran, Afghanistan, Turkmenistan, Tajikistan, Uzbekistan and southwestern Kazakhstan to northern Pakistan and Ladakh in northwestern India. It prefers grassland, open woodland and gentle slopes, but also inhabits cold arid zones with little vegetation.

=== Population ===
The Punjab urial is endemic to Kala Chitta Range and Salt Range in northern Punjab. A 2024–25 survey estimated 532 Punjab urials at Kalabagh Game Reserve with an average density of 8.9 animals/km sq. An earlier survey in 2021 estimated 3,484 Punjab urials in the wider area of 7,953 km^{2} (3,071 sq mi), with an average density of 0.4 animals/km sq. The Ladakh urial is found in Gilgit-Baltistan, Pakistan and Ladakh, India. A 2024–25 survey by the Government of Gilgit-Baltistan counted 229 individuals in five districts of Gilgit-Baltistan. In Ladakh, a 2018 survey estimated 686 individuals. The population of Baluchistan urials in Khuzdar and Lasbela over a four year period in 2019–2022 was found to have decreased from 860 individuals in 2019 to 534 in 2022.

== Behaviour and ecology ==
Urials are sexually dimorphic. The mating season begins in November. Rams select four or five ewes, which give birth to a lamb, or less often two, after a gestation of five months in April to June.
