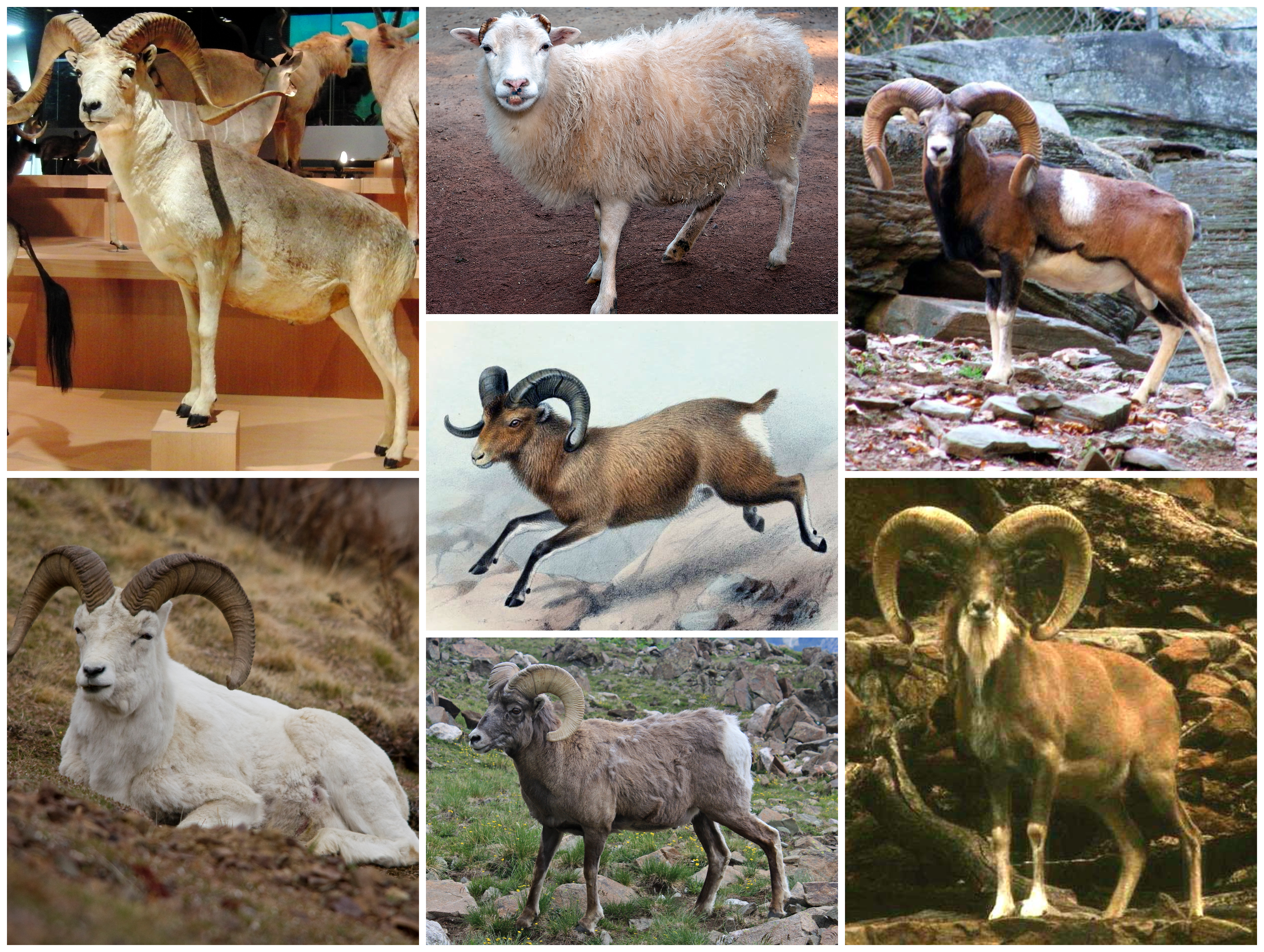
- There are seven species of Ovis.

Scientific classification
- Kingdom: Animalia
- Phylum: Chordata
- Class: Mammalia
- Order: Artiodactyla
- Family: Bovidae
- Subfamily: Caprinae
- Tribe: Caprini
- Genus: Ovis; Linnaeus, 1758

Type species
- Ovis aries Linnaeus, 1758

Species
- See text

Audio
- Lamb bleating and its mother's response

= Ovis =

Genus of mammals

Ovis is a genus of mammals, part of the Caprinae subfamily of the ruminant family Bovidae. Its seven species, including its type species O. aries, are highly sociable and are known as sheep or ovines. Domestic sheep are thought to be descended from the wild mouflon (O. gmelini) of central and southwest Asia.

== Terminology ==
Female sheep are called ewes, males are called rams or less frequently bucks or tups, neutered males are called wethers, and young sheep are called lambs. The adjective applying to sheep is ovine, and the collective term for sheep is flock or mob. The term herd is also occasionally used in this sense, generally for large flocks. Many specialist terms relating to domestic sheep are used.

== Characteristics ==
Sheep are fairly small compared to other ungulates; In most species, adults weigh less than 100 kg (220 lb). Males are usually significantly heavier than females. Wild sheep are mostly found in hilly or mountainous habitats. Their diets consist mainly of grasses, as well as other plants and lichens. Like other ruminants, they have four-chambered stomachs, which play a vital role in digesting food; they eructate, and rechew the cud to enable them to digest and live on low-quality, rough plant materials. Sheep conserve water well, and can live in fairly dry environments.

The bodies of wild sheep (and some domestic breeds) are covered by a coat of thick hair to protect them from cold. This coat contains long, stiff hairs, called kemps, over a short, woolly undercoat, which grows in autumn and is shed in spring. This woolly undercoat has been developed in many domestic sheep breeds into a fleece of long wool, with selection against kemp hairs in these breeds. The fleece covers the body (in a few breeds also the face and legs) and is used for fibre. Domestic sheep are also reared for their milk and meat (which is called lamb or mutton depending on the age of the animal).

In wild sheep, both rams and ewes have horns, while in domestic sheep (depending upon breed) horns may be present in both rams and ewes, in rams only, or in neither. Rams' horns may be very large – those of a mature bighorn ram can weigh 14 kg (31 lb) – as much as the bones of the rest of its body put together. Rams use their horns to fight with each other for dominance and the right to mate with females. In most cases, they do not injure each other because they hit each other head-to-head, and their curved horns do not strike each other's bodies. They are also protected by having very thick skin and double-layered skulls.

Wild sheep have very keen senses of sight and hearing. When detecting predators, wild sheep most often flee, usually to higher ground, but they can also fight back. The Dall sheep has been known to butt wolves off the face of cliffs.

Sheep have scent glands on their faces and feet. Communication through the scent glands is not well understood, but is thought to be important for sexual signaling. Males can smell females that are in estrus, and rams mark their territories by rubbing scent on rocks.

== Species ==
Seven extant species (and numerous subspecies) of sheep are currently recognized. The main recognized divisions are:

Image	Scientific name	Common name	Distribution
	Ovis ammon	Argali or mountain sheep	Central Kazakhstan in the west to the Shanxi Province in China
	Ovis aries	Domestic sheep	Domesticated
	Ovis canadensis	Bighorn sheep	North America
	Ovis dalli	Dall sheep or thinhorn sheep	Northwestern North America.
	Ovis gmelini	Mouflon	Turkey, Armenia, Azerbaijan, and Iran
	Ovis nivicola	Snow sheep	Northeast of Siberia
	Ovis vignei	Urial	Central and South Asia.

=== Extinct species ===
At least two extinct species in the genus have been recognized from fossil identification:

Scientific name	Notes
Ovis claudiusguerini	A fossil species from the Early Pleistocene of France.
Ovis gracilis	A fossil species from the Early Pleistocene of Taurida Cave, Crimea.

== Behaviour ==
Sheep are social animals and live in groups, called flocks. This helps them to avoid predators and stay warm in cold weather by huddling together. Flocks of sheep need to keep moving to find new grazing areas and more favourable weather as the seasons change. In each flock, a sheep, usually a mature ram, is followed by the others. This "leader to follower" relationship can be both a positive and negative for flocks of Ovis aries. Although there is safety in numbers, it has been reported that the following of one mature ram can bring flocks to slaughter in many situations where the mature ram misguides the flock.

=== Mating ===
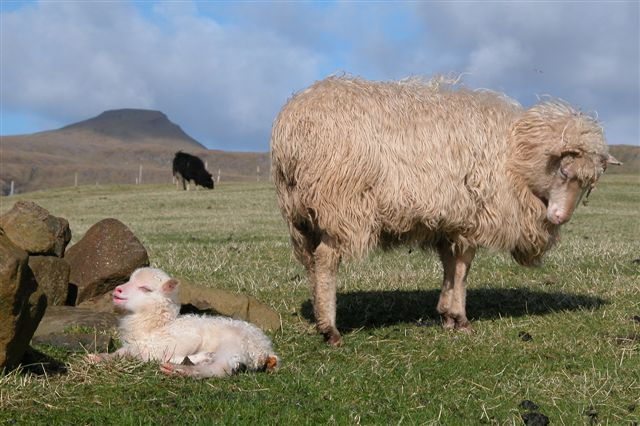
Sheep

Mating in sheep is characterized by males competing for females in estrus. Social rank in rams is established by male-male competition during the rutting period. Females select from dominant males based on sexually selected characteristics such as body size and horn size, as those traits are desirable in offspring.

Females typically are separated from males outside the rut, but during the rut, females and males are found together. Females that are oestrous isolate themselves from other ewes, and may be less mobile. The rut is also linked with different ewe behaviour than during nonrutting periods. These changes are characterized by decreased feeding, increased time observing their surroundings, and increased behaviour changes. Ewes are also predicted to be highly receptive to the displays of the rams.

== See also ==
- Aries (astrology) – First astrological sign of the zodiac
- Barbary sheep – Species of wild sheep native to Africa
- Bharal – Species of wild sheep native to the Himalayas
