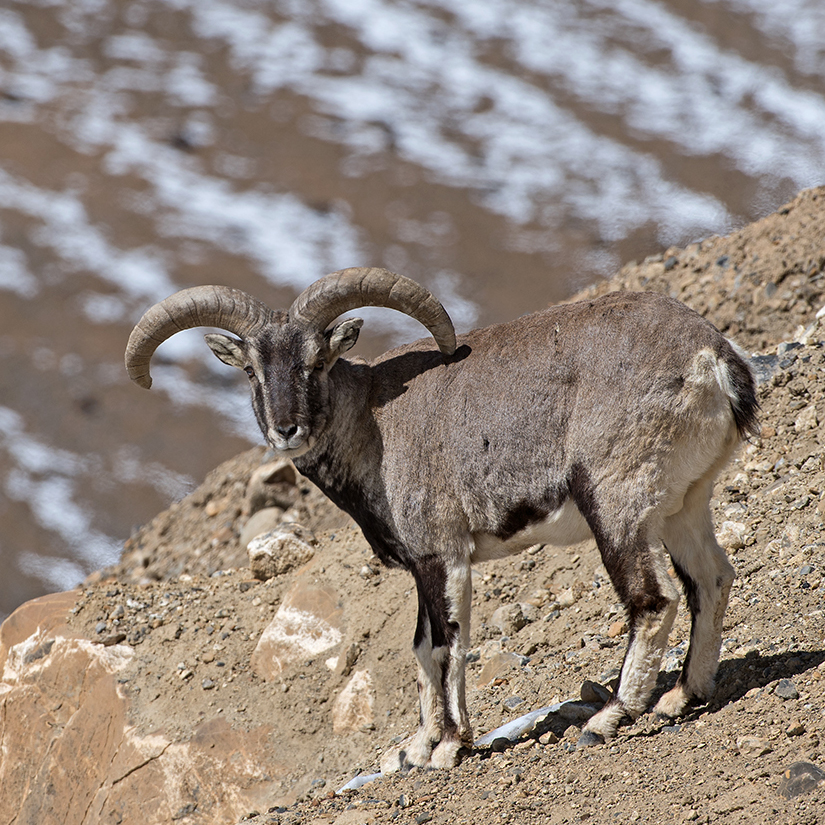
- Male bharal in Spiti Valley
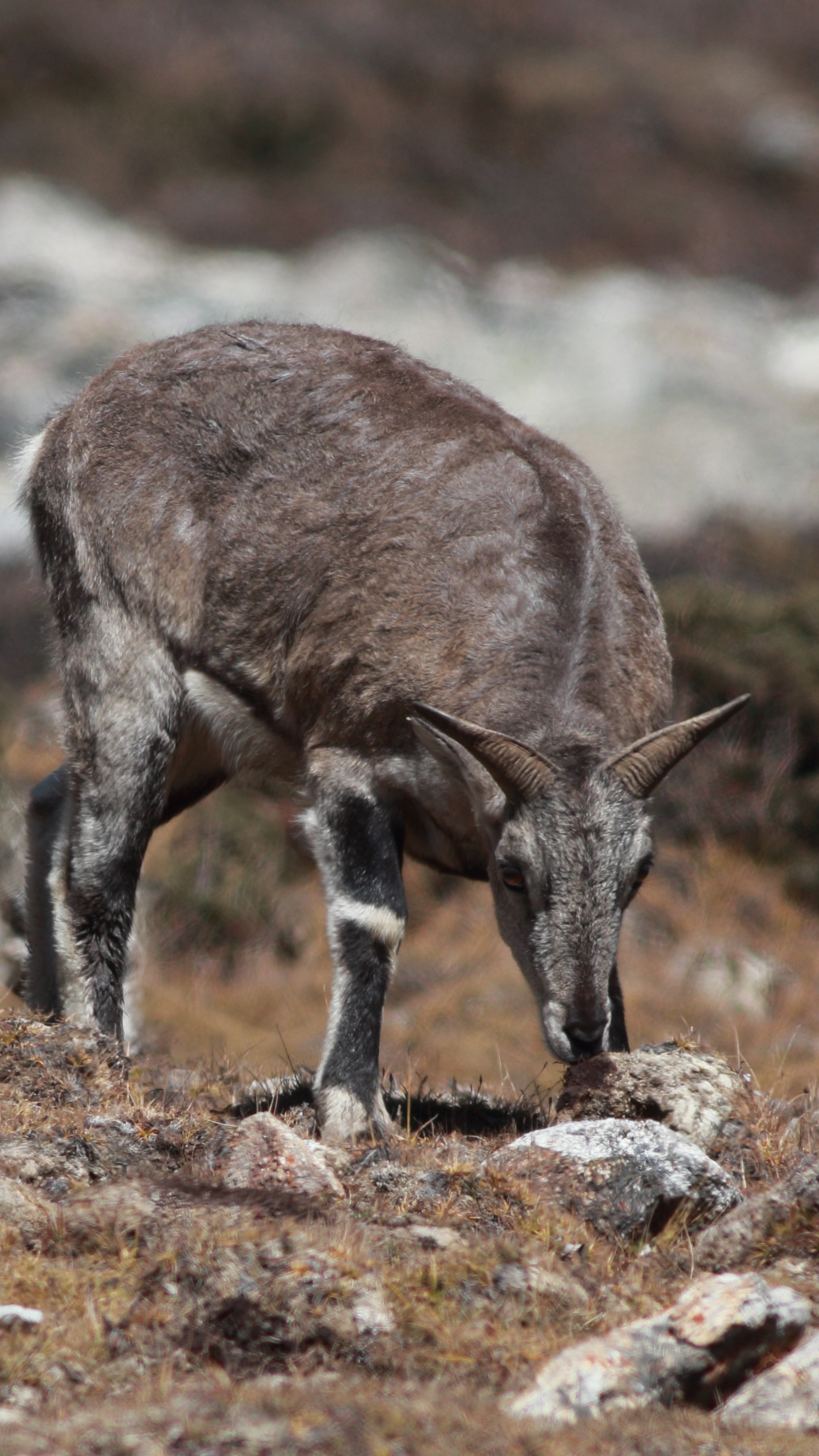
- Female bharal in North Sikkim

Conservation status
- Least Concern (IUCN 3.1)
- CITES Appendix III

Scientific classification
- Kingdom: Animalia
- Phylum: Chordata
- Class: Mammalia
- Infraclass: Placentalia
- Order: Artiodactyla
- Family: Bovidae
- Subfamily: Caprinae
- Genus: Pseudois; Hodgson, 1846
- Species: P. nayaur

Binomial name
- Pseudois nayaur (Hodgson, 1833)
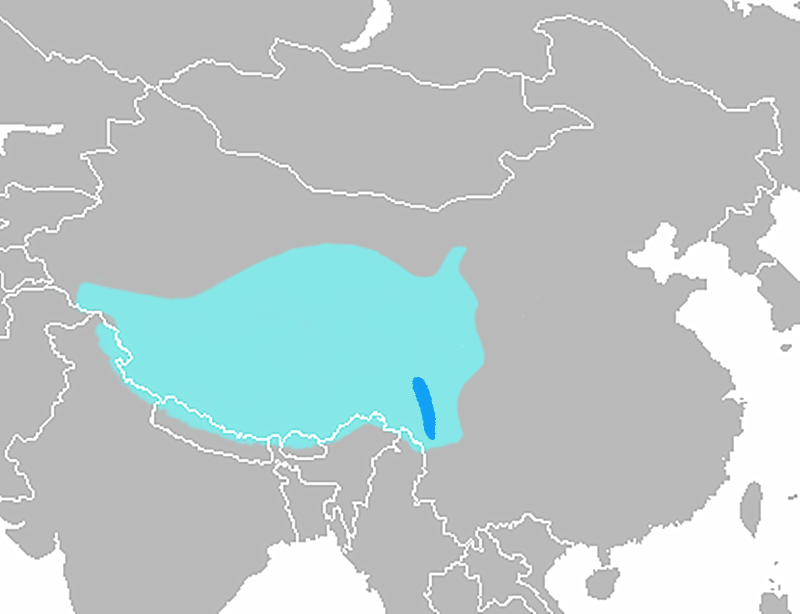
- Distribution of blue sheep; dwarf blue sheep range in darker blue

Synonyms
- Pseudois schaeferi Haltenorth, 1963 Pseudois nayaur schaeferi Species synonymy: Ovis nayaur (Hodgson, 1833); Ovis nahoor (Hodgson, 1835); Ovis burrhel (Blyth, 1840); Ovis nahura (J.E. Gray, 1840); Ovis barhal (Hodgson, 1846); Ovis burhel (J.E. Gray, 1833)

= Bharal =

Species of wild sheep native to the Himalayas

The bharal (Pseudois nayaur), also called the blue sheep, is a caprine native to the high Himalayas. It inhabits the Himalayan alpine meadows and rocky slopes across Bhutan, China, India, Myanmar, Nepal, and Pakistan, typically at altitudes of 2,200–5,500 m (7,200–18,000 ft).

The bharal is the only member of its genus Pseudois and is genetically closer to goats (Capra) than sheep (Ovis). Two main subspecies are recognized: the Himalayan blue sheep (P. n. nayaur) and the Chinese blue sheep (P. n. szechuanensis), with recent studies suggesting the Helanshan blue sheep may be a distinct subspecies. The dwarf blue sheep was once considered a separate species but is now classified as a variant of the Chinese blue sheep.

The bharal is a medium-sized caprine, measuring 115–165 cm (45–65 in) in length, and weighing 35–75 kg (77–165 lb). It has a slate-grey fur with white underparts. Both sexes have horns, with the males having larger curved horns measuring up to 80 cm (31 in). The Helanshan variant is smaller in size, with less pronounced sexual dimorphism and straighter horns.

The bharal is mainly a grazer, feeding on grasses, but also browses shrubs when food is scarce. It relies on camouflage and shelter under the cliffs to evade predators. Rutting occurs from late November to mid-January, with males usually engaging in various maneuvers to mate. Though it is classified as Least Concern by the IUCN, it face threats from poaching and competition with livestock, but these impacts are limited due to their often isolated and rugged habitats.

== Etymology ==
Bharal is the common name of the sheep in Hindi, and it is called "blue sheep" in English due to the bluish tint of its fur. The genus name Pseudois is a combination of Greek words pseudes and ois meaning "false" and "sheep", respectively. The species name nayaur appears to come from the Nepali word nahur, a local name for the species. Its native names include yanyang in Mandarin; bharal, barhal, bharar, and bharut in Hindi; na or sna in Tibetan and Ladakhi; nabo in Spitian; and na or gnao in Bhutanese.

== Taxonomy and evolution ==
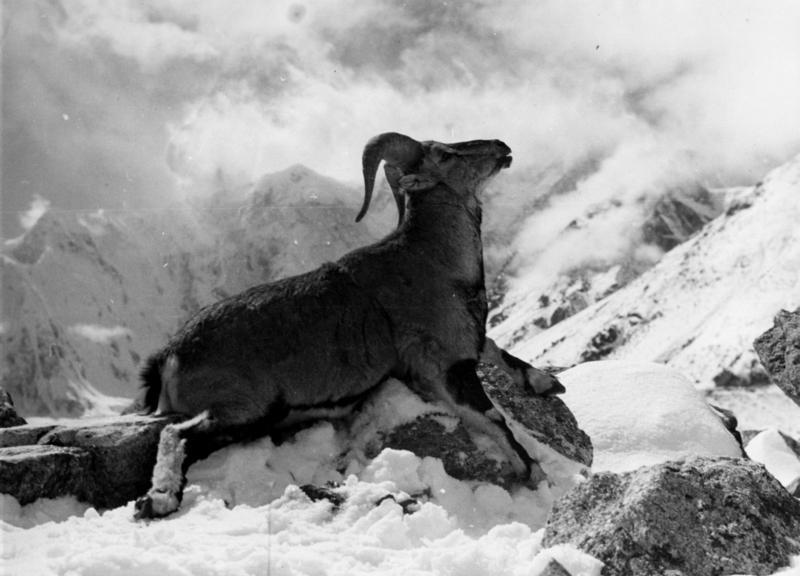
The dwarf blue sheep was formerly thought to be a distinct species of the bharal

The bharal is the only member of the genus Pseudois. Mitochondrial DNA analysis suggested that the bharal is closely related to the goats (Capra) of the Caprinae sub-family rather than domestic sheep (Ovis). Two subspecies of the bharal have been recognised: the Chinese blue sheep (P. n. szechuanensis) and the Himalayan blue sheep (P. n. nayaur). Recent genetic studies suggest that the Helanshan blue sheep, found in the Helan Mountains may be a distinct subspecies.

The dwarf blue sheep, endemic to Sichuan-Tibet in China was formerly described as a separate species (Pseudois schaeferi), and later as a subspecies of P. nayaur (P. n. schaeferi). However, a 2012 genetic analysis of these sheep found no indication that it was either a distinct species or subspecies, instead finding them to be a morphologically distinct variant of the Chinese blue sheep (P. n. szechuanensis). This led to the reclassification of it to be conspecific with P. nayaur.

== Description ==
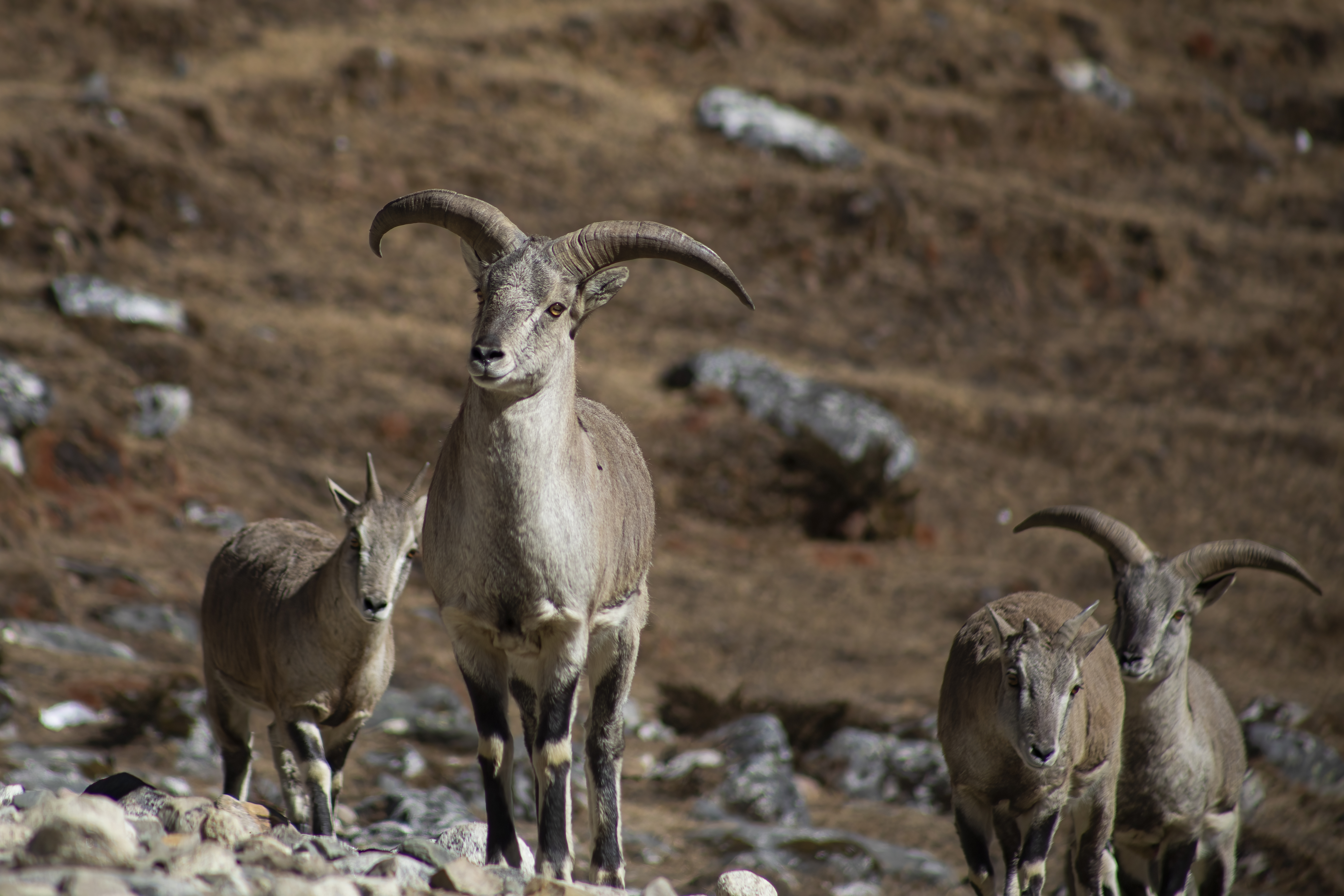
Two pairs of bharals in Nepal

The bharal is a medium-sized caprid measuring 115 to 165 cm (45 to 65 in) long along the head-and-body, with 10 to 20 cm (3.9 to 7.9 in)-long tail. It stands 69 to 91 cm (27 to 36 in) high at the shoulder, and weighs around 35 to 75 kg (77 to 165 lb). Males are slightly larger than females. It has a dense fur that is slate grey in colour, sometimes with a bluish sheen. The underparts and backs of the legs are white, while the chest and front of the legs are black. A charcoal-colored stripe separates the grey back and white belly. The ears are small, with a dark bridge of the nose. Horns are found in both sexes and consist of shallow ridges on the upper surface. Males have larger horns, which diverge from each other moving upwards, before turning sideways and curving backwards towards the edges. They may grow to a length of 80 cm (31 in). In females, the horns are much shorter and straighter, growing up to 20 cm (7.9 in) long.

The dwarf blue sheep differs from the other members of the bharal family primarily in size, with adult males weighing around 35 kg (77 lb), and with a less differentiated sexual dimorphism. The females are similar in size to its relatives. Its coat is steely grey with a silvery sheen, with darker general colouration than the other bharals, and the horns of the male are smaller, thinner and more upright, with no inward curl.

== Distribution and habitat ==
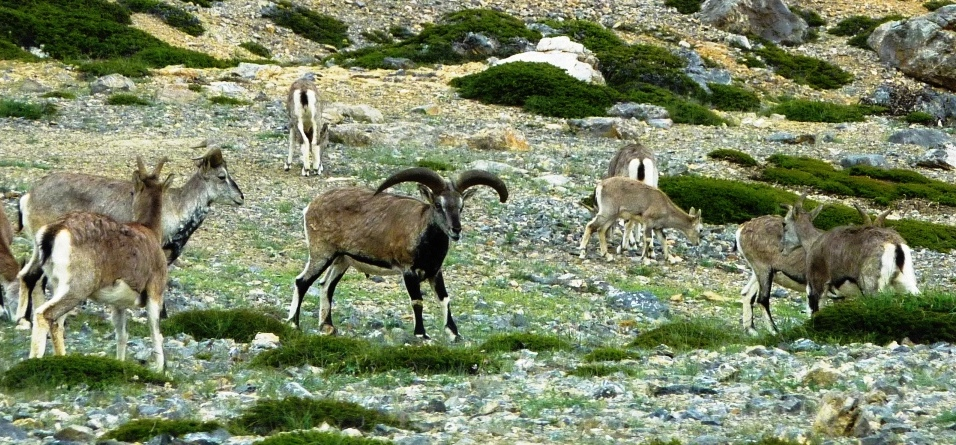
Herd of bharals in Ladakh

The bharal occurs in the Himalayan region in Bhutan, India, Nepal, Pakistan, and in China and Myanmar. The Himalayan bharal occurs in elevations of 2,200–5,500 m (7,200–18,000 ft) in the alpine meadows, and rocky slopes of the Himalayas. The Chinese bharal occurs in the Sichuan region of China. It occupies gentle mountain slopes, covered with grasses and ridges, at an altitude of 3,000–5,500 m (9,800–18,000 ft). The dwarf blue sheep inhabit low, arid, grassy slopes of the upper Yangtze gorge in Batang County of the Sichuan Province, and a small part of the Tibet Autonomous Region in China. They occupy lower altitudes of 2,600–3,200 m (8,500–10,500 ft), and are separated from the Chinese Baral population in Sichuan by thick scrub forest. The Helanshan blue sheep occur only in the montane forests of the Helan range in the border regions of Inner Mongolia and Ningxia.

== Behaviour and ecology ==
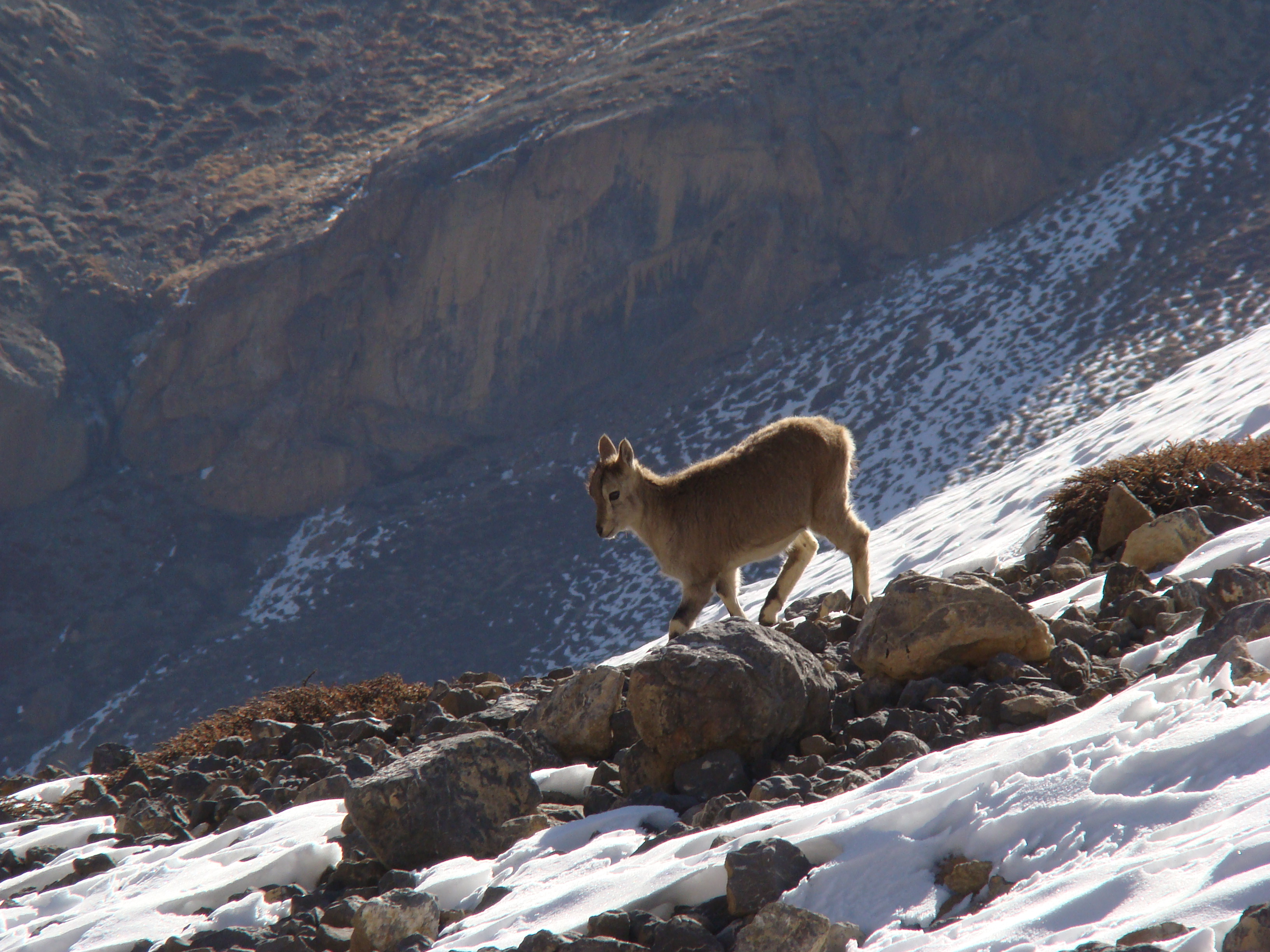
A juvenile bharal

The bharal is active throughout the day, alternating between feeding and resting on the grassy mountain slopes. Due to its excellent camouflage and the absence of cover in its environment, it often remains motionless when approached. Once it has been noticed, however, it may scamper up to the precipitous cliffs, where it once again freezes, using camouflage to blend into the rock face. Population densities in Nepal were found to be 0.9–2.7 animals per km^{2}, increasing to a maximum of 10 animals in the winter, as herds congregate in valleys. The bharal is mainly a grazer, but during times of scarcity of grass, they switch to browsing, eating forbs and shrubs. As there is a high degree of diet overlap between common livestock and the bharals in regions where they occur together, it results in resource competition and a decline in the bharal density. The bharal is the favored prey of the snow leopard where their ranges overlap, and is also hunted by Himalayan wolf, and leopard, with a few lambs falling prey to foxes or eagles.

The rutting of the bharal starts towards late November and continues until mid-January. During the rut, the male bharals use multiple strategies for mating, such as tending, blocking, and coursing.

== Threats and conservation ==
The bharal is categorised as Least Concern by the International Union for Conservation of Nature. The population faces some threats including poaching for meat and competition with livestock. However, poaching is rare due to its habitat in mountainous terrain, and similarly, livestock do not generally frequent the mountainous regions where the Bharals occur, and even if they do coexist, no notable detrimental effect on the bharal population has been documented.

== See also ==
- Barbary sheep – Species of wild sheep native to Africa
- Nilgiri tahr – Species of goat endemic to South India
