= Ghamot National Park =

National park in Pakistan

The Ghamot National Park also spelt Gumot is a national park in Azad Kashmir, Pakistan. It is located in Neelam District of AJK and it was established in 2004. Conservation efforts in the Gumot National Park are funded by the Global Environment Facility Small Grants Programme and implemented by the Himalayan Wildlife Foundation. The national park is significant as it hosts a connected population of the threatened Himalayan Brown Bear of Pakistan, connected through a network of national parks in northern Pakistan including the Deosai National Park and Musk Deer National Park. The park also hosts a population of the threatened musk deer.

== Fauna ==
List of birds found in the national park.

#	Name	Scientific name	Status	Breeding
1	Himalayan vulture	Gyps himalayensis	Rare	No
2	Golden eagle	Aquila chrysaetos	Rare	No
3	Eurasian sparrowhawk	Accipiter nisus	Rare	Yes
4	Bearded vulture	Gypaetus barbatus	Rare	No
5	Pallid harrier	Circus macrourus	Rare	No
6	Common swift	Apus apus	Common	Yes
7	Pacific swift	Apus pacificus	Common	Yes
8	Little swift	Circus macrourus	Common	Yes
9	Long-tailed minivet	Pericrocotus ethologus	Becoming rare	Yes
10	Rosy minivet	Pericrocotus roseus	Rare	Yes
11	Orange minivet	Pericrocotus flammeus	Common	Yes
12	Eurasian collared dove	Streptopelia decaocto	Rare	Yes
13	Red collared dove	Streptopelia tranquebarica	Rare	Yes
14	Spotted dove	Spilopelia chinensi	Rare	Yes
15	Rock dove	Columba livia	Common	No
16	Oriental turtle dove	Streptopelia orientalis	Rare	Yes
17	Yellow-billed blue magpie	Urocissa flavirostris	Rare	No
18	Spotted nutcracker	Nucifraga caryocatactes	Rare	Yes
19	Alpine chough	Pyrrhocorax graculus	Rare	No
20	Red-billed chough	Pyrrhocorax pyrrhocorax	Rare	No
21	Large-billed crow	Corvus macrorhynchos	Common	Yes
22	European roller	Coracias garrulous	Common	Yes
23	Indian roller	Coracias benghalensis	Rare	Yes
24	Grey-bellied cuckoo	Cacomantis passerines	Rare	Yes
25	Jacobin cuckoo	Tadorna tadorna	Rare	Yes
26	Asian koel	Eudynamys scolopacea	Rare	Yes
27	Plain prinia	Prinia inornata	Common	Yes
28	Zitting cisticola	Cisticola juncidis	Common	Yes
29	Himalayan prinia	Prinia criniger	Becoming rare	Yes
30	Common tailorbird	Orthotomus sutorius	Rare	No
31	Brown dipper	Cinclus pallasii	Rare	No
32	Bar-tailed treecreeper	Certhia himalayana	Rare	No
33	Eurasian treecreeper	Certhia familiaris	Common	No
34	Black drongo	Dicrurus macrocercus	Common	Yes
35	Ashy drongo	Dicrurus leucophaeus	Abundant	Yes
36	Scaly-breasted munia	Lonchura punctulata	Common	No
37	Rock bunting	Emberiza cia	Common	Yes
38	Crested bunting	Melophus lathami	Common	Yes
39	Chestnut-eared bunting	Emberiza fucata	Rare	Yes
40	Pine bunting	Emberiza leucocephalos	Common	Yes
41	White-capped bunting	Emberiza stewarti	Common	Yes
42	Streaked laughingthrush	Garrulax lineatus	Abundant	No
43	Variegated laughingthrush	Garrulax variegates	Rare	No
44	Spectacled finch	Callacanthis burtoni	Rare	Yes
45	Yellow-breasted greenfinch	Carduelis spinoides	Summer visitor	Yes
46	Common rosefinch	Carpodacus erythrinus	Common	Yes
47	Dark-breasted rosefinch	Carpodacus nipalensis	Common	Yes
48	Pink-browed rosefinch	Carpodacus rhodochrous	Common	Yes
50	Eurasian hobby	Falco subbuteo	Rare	No
51	Common kestrel	Falco tinnunculus	Becoming rare	Yes
52	Asian house martin	Delichon dasypus	Becoming rare	Yes
53	Sand martin	Riparia riparia	Rare	Yes
54	Barn swallow	Hirundo rustica	Rare	No
55	Great grey shrike	Lanius excubitor	Rare	Yes
56	Long-tailed shrike	Lanius schach	Common	Yes
57	Red-flanked bluetail	Tarsiger cyanurus	Rare	Yes
58	Plumbeous water redstart	Rhyacornis fuliginosus	Common	Yes
59	Spotted flycatcher	Muscicapa striata	Common	Yes
60	Verditer flycatcher	Eumyias thalassinus	Rare	Yes
61	White-capped redstart	Chaimarrornis leucocephalus	Rare	Yes
62	African stonechat	Saxicola torquata	Rare	No
63	Pied bush chat	Saxicola caprata	Becoming rare	No
64	Grey bush chat	Saxicola ferreus	Common	No
65	Chestnut-bellied rock thrush	Monticola rufiventris	Rare	Yes
66	Blue rock thrush	Monticola solitarius	Rare	Yes
67	Blue-capped rock thrush	Monticola cinclorhyncha	Rare	Yes
68	Himalayan rubythroat	Luscinia pectoralis	Rare	Yes
69	Spotted forktail	Enicurus maculatus	Common	Yes
70	Little forktail	Enicurus scouler	Rare	Yes
71	Kashmir flycatcher	Ficedula subrubra	Rare	Yes
72	Slaty-blue flycatcher	Ficedula tricolor	Rare	Yes
73	Little pied flycatcher	Ficedula westermanni	Rare	Yes
74	Common redstart	Phoenicurus phoenicurus	Abundant	Yes
75	Crested lark	Galerida cristata	Common	Resident
76	Indian paradise flycatcher	Terpsiphone paradisi	Rare	Yes
77	Wire-tailed swallow	Hirundo smithii	Scarce	Summer visitor
78	Blue-throated barbet	Psilopogon asiaticus	Rare	No
79	Great barbet	Megalaima virens	Rare	Yes
80	White wagtail	Motacilla alba	Rare	Yes
81	Upland pipit	Anthus sylvanus	Rare	No
82	Grey wagtail	Motacilla cinerea	Becoming rare	Yes
83	Citrine wagtail	Motacilla citreola	Rare	Yes
84	Western yellow wagtail	Motacilla flava	Rare	Yes
85	Eurasian golden oriole	Oriolus oriolus	Rare	No
86	Himalayan monal	Lophophorus impejanus	Rare	Yes
87	Koklass pheasant	Pucrasia macrolopha	Rare	Yes
88	Chukar partridge	Alectoris chukar	Rare	Yes
89	Himalayan snowcock	Tetraogallus himalayensis	Rare	Yes
90	Kalij pheasant	Lophura leucomelanos	Rare	Yes
91	Western tragopan	Tragopan melanocephalus	Rare	No
92	Great tit	Parus major	Becoming rare	Yes
93	Green-backed tit	Parus monticolus	Common	No
94	Fire-capped tit	Cephalopyrus flammiceps	Summer visitor	Yes
95	Black-crested tit	Parus melanolophus	Common	Yes
96	Rufous-naped tit	Parus rufonuchalis	Rare	Rare
97	Himalayan black-lored tit	Parus xanthogeny	Rare	Yes
98	House sparrow	Passer domesticus	Rare	Yes
99	Russet sparrow	Passer rutilans	Rare	Yes
100	Rose-ringed parakeet	Psittacula krameri	Rare	No
101	Alpine accentor	Prunella collaris	Common	Yes
102	Rufous-breasted accentor	Prunella strophiata	Common	No
103	Red-vented bulbul	Pycnonotus cafer	Rare	Yes
104	Black bulbul	Hypsipetes leucocephalus	Rare	Yes
105	Himalayan bulbul	Pycnontus leucogenys	Rare	Yes
106	Grey-hooded warbler	Seicercus xanthoschistos	Rare	Yes
107	Pallas's leaf warbler	Phylloscopus proregulus	Rare	No
108	Large-billed leaf warbler	Phylloscopus magnirostris	Rare	Yes
109	White-cheeked nuthatch	Sitta leucopsis	Rare	Yes
110	Tickell's leaf warbler	Phylloscopus affinis	Rare	Yes
111	Snow partridge	Lerwa lerwa	Rare	Yes
112	Common chiffchaff	Pucrasia macrolopha	Rare	Yes
113	Yellow-browed warbler	Phylloscopus inornatus	Common	Yes
114	Greenish warbler	Phylloscopus trochiloides	Becoming rare	Yes
115	Scaly-bellied woodpecker	Picus squamatus	Rare	Yes
116	Himalayan woodpecker	Dendrocopos himalayensis	Rare	Yes
117	Goldcrest	Regulus regulus	Rare	No
118	White-throated fantail	Rhipidura albicollis	Common	Yes
119	Brown wood owl	Strix leptogrammica	Rare	Yes
120	Asian barred owlet	Glaucidium cuculoides	Rare	No
121	Kashmir nuthatch	Sitta cashmirensis	Rare	Rare
122	Song thrush	Turdus philomelos	Rare	Yes
123	Tickell's thrush	Turdus unicolor	Rare	Yes
124	Mistle thrush	Turdus viscivorus	Rare	Yes
125	Eurasian hoopoe	Upupa epops	Rare	Yes
126	Common myna	Acridotheres tristis	Rare	Yes
127	Common starling	Sturnus vulgaris	Common	Yes
128	Indian white-eye	Zosterops palpebrosa	Abundant	No
