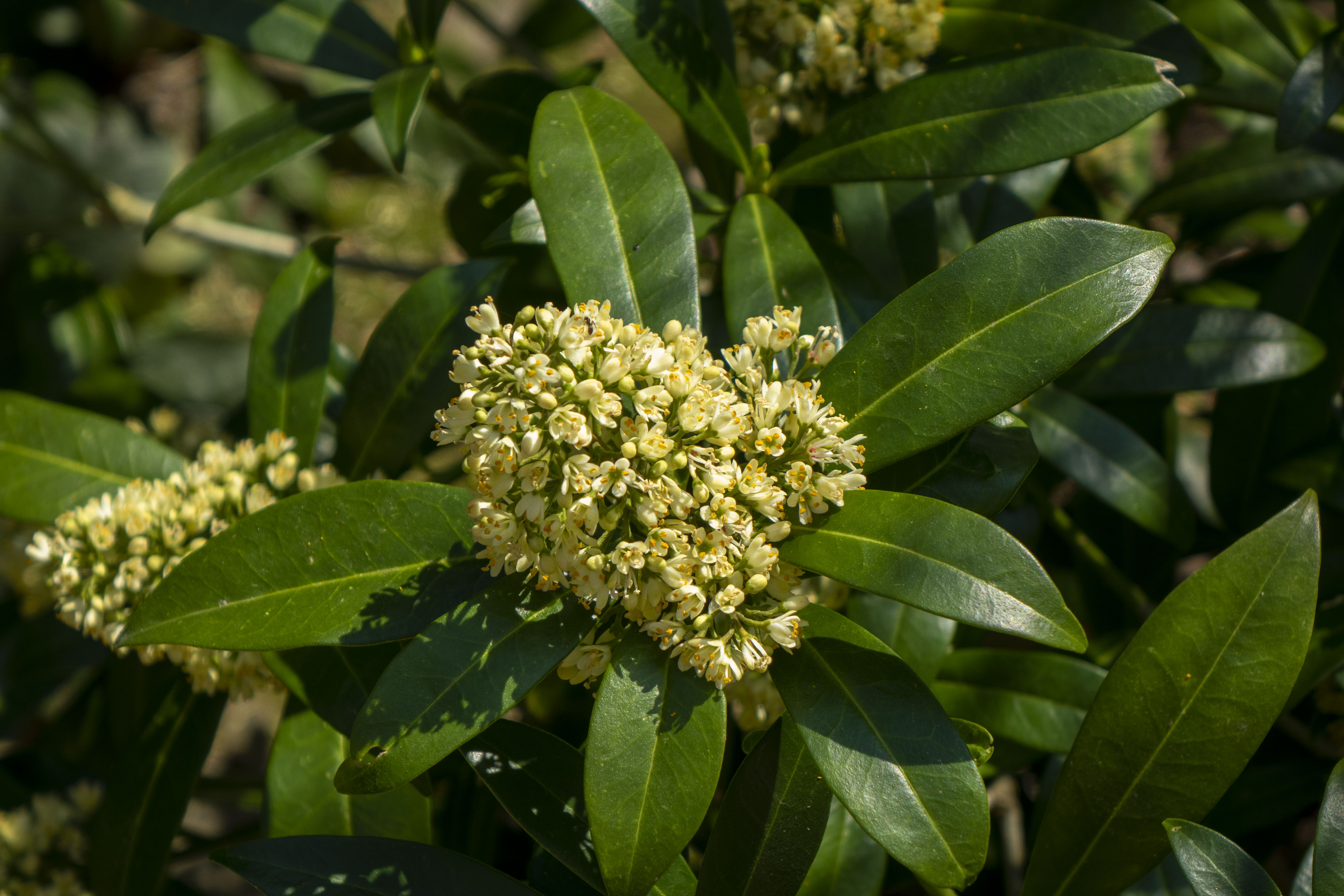

Scientific classification
- Kingdom: Plantae
- Clade: Tracheophytes
- Clade: Angiosperms
- Clade: Eudicots
- Clade: Rosids
- Order: Sapindales
- Family: Rutaceae
- Genus: Skimmia
- Species: S. × confusa

Binomial name
- Skimmia × confusa N.P.Taylor

= Skimmia × confusa =

Hybrid species of plant

Skimmia × confusa is a Skimmia hybrid, a shrub with evergreen, strongly-scented foliage and large flower clusters. It is presumed to have originated in British gardens as a cross between S. japonica var. japonica and S. anquetilia.

== Description ==
Skimmia × confusa is a strongly aromatic shrub that typically grows between 0.5 and 3 m (1.6 and 9.8 ft). Young stems, about one to two years old, measure 3–5 mm (0.12–0.20 in) in thickness and are green before aging into a yellowish-grey bark.

The leaves are narrow and elongated—ranging from oblanceolate to narrowly elliptic—and measure about 7.5–15 cm (3.0–5.9 in) long and 2–5 cm (0.79–1.97 in) wide. They have smooth edges, taper to a pointed tip, and narrow gradually toward the base. The texture is somewhat leathery. When dried, the upper surface becomes finely granular and shows about 10–15 pairs of lateral veins. The leaf stalk is short and not sharply defined, usually up to about 1.5 cm (0.59 in) long, green, and sometimes faintly reddish brown.

The plant produces a large, pyramidal flowering cluster (inflorescence), which in male plants can reach up to 15 cm (5.9 in) in both length and width. The flowers are unisexual and sweet-scented. Male flowers have five parts and creamy-white petals that stay partly upright at about a 45-degree angle; their anthers are orange. Female flowers have four or five parts and display fully open, white petals.

Fruiting is variable. In some years, the plant may form an infructescence with dozens of small, bright-red, flattened spherical drupes, most of which are sterile. Occasionally, one or more full-sized fruits develop, about 10 mm (0.39 in) in diameter, globose, and containing a well-formed stone.

== Origin ==
Before being scientifically described in 1987, Skimmia × confusa was the subject of much confusion and frequently mislabeled as S. laureola. This was realized to be a mistake when plants discovered in the wild were found not to match any of the hundreds of herbarium specimens. The epithet confusa means "confused".

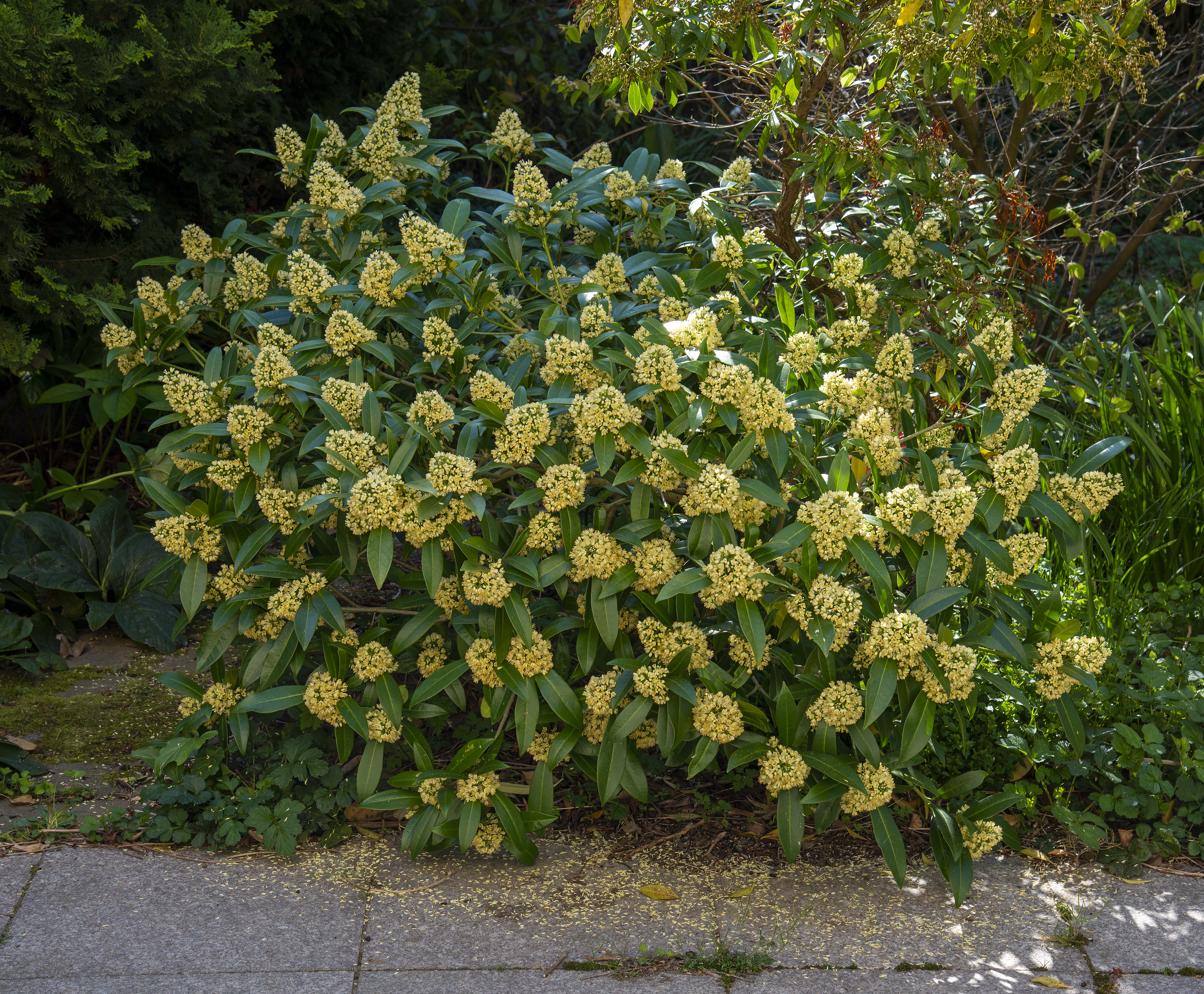
Skimmia × confusa is presumed to have arisen in British gardens between 1861 and 1960.

The origin of S. × confusa is not documented. The earliest herbarium specimens date from 1960, but it likely arose much earlier because it had been present in various long-established gardens by that time. The combination of strongly scented foliage and red fruits (rarely borne) suggests that S. × confusa is a hybrid between S. japonica var. japonica and S. anquetilia. Because S. japonica does not occur in the wild with either S. laureola or S. anquetilia–the two Skimmia species which have strongly scented foliage–S. × confusa is presumed to have originated in British gardens, where it is widely distributed; S. laureola can be discounted as a parent species because it was not in cultivation when S. × confusa first arose. The hybrid also could not have arisen before 1861, when S. japonica was introduced in cultivation. The male clones have five-parted and only partially opened flowers, which is otherwise seen exclusively in S. anquetilia. Both male and female individuals proved to be diploid (2n = 30), matching the chromosome number of S. japonica and S. anquetilia.

S. japonica and S. anquetilia are the most distantly related (and geographically most remote) species within their genus, and this may explain the high sterility of the pollen and infrequency of normal fruit with full-sized stones in S. × confusa. The plant also displays a significant hybrid vigor compared to both presumed parent species.

== Cultivation ==
Two cultivars are available. The male clone, 'Kew Green', produces exceptionally large, pyramidal inflorescences composed of strongly fragrant, cream-coloured flowers, and its bright new foliage stands out among shade-tolerant evergreens. It has a broad, spreading growth form and a mature height of approximately 1–2 m (3.3–6.6 ft), making it suited for use in sizeable woodland or semi-shaded garden settings. The female clone, 'Isabella', reaches at least 3 m (9.8 ft) and spreads wide. It produces white, fully expanding 4-5-merous flowers. Its fruit is bright red and its leaves notably broader than those of 'Kew Green'. The evergreen foliage is spicy and lemon-scented. It blooms in spring. It prefers shade and moist loam over light, sandy soil. It is easily propagated by cuttings.
