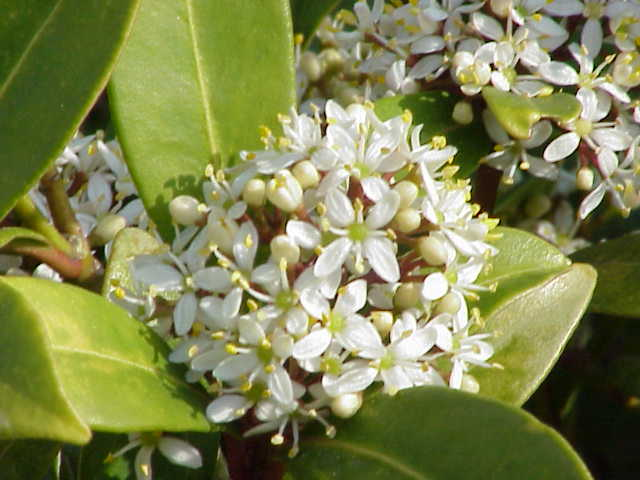
- S. japonica var. reevesiana flowers
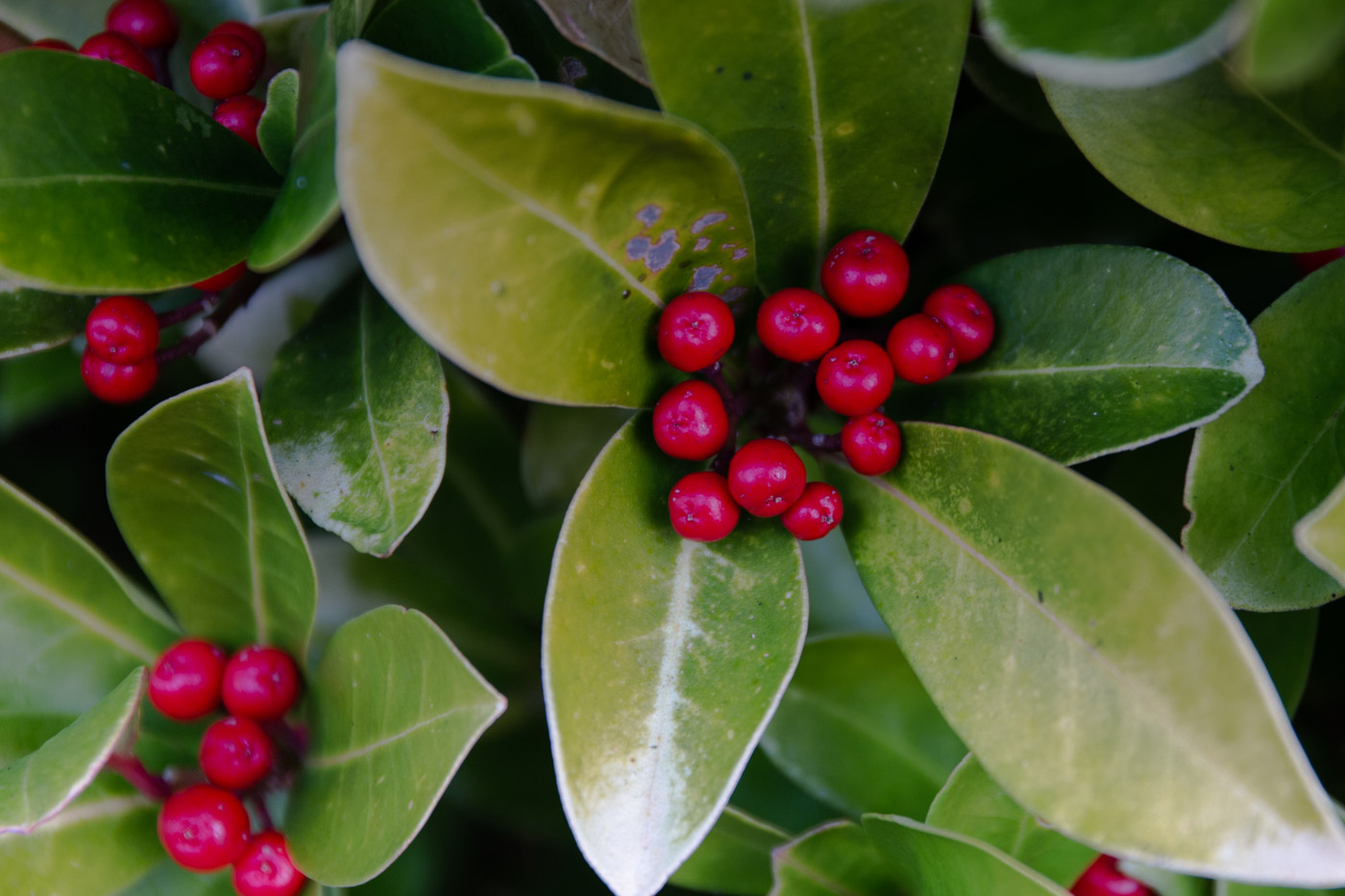
- S. japonica var. reevesiana fruit

Scientific classification
- Kingdom: Plantae
- Clade: Tracheophytes
- Clade: Angiosperms
- Clade: Eudicots
- Clade: Rosids
- Order: Sapindales
- Family: Rutaceae
- Genus: Skimmia
- Species: S. japonica

Binomial name
- Skimmia japonica Thunb.

= Skimmia japonica =

Species of flowering plant

Skimmia japonica, the Japanese skimmia, is a species of flowering plant in the family Rutaceae. Native to Japan, Taiwan, China, Vietnam, Philippines, and the Russian Far East, it is commonly grown in parks and gardens for its evergreen leaves, fragrant flowers, and attractive fruit. It is a highly variable species, with its varieties differing in height, spread, and chromosome count, among other things.

== Description ==
Skimmia japonica is a dense, evergreen shrub. The plant grows 60–200 cm tall and is smooth throughout except for the flower clusters, which carry a fine fuzz. The branches rise at an angle, are grayish, and bear small glandular bumps called tubercles. The leaves are arranged alternately, though they can seem loosely whorled. Each leaf has a short stalk 0.5–1 cm long. The blades are narrow and elongated—6–12 cm long and 2.5–3.5 cm wide—with a tip that narrows abruptly before ending in a rounded point. The base tapers, the margins are smooth, the upper surface is glossy, and the underside is yellowish with scattered oil glands. Female plants tend to grow wider than male plants.

Flower clusters sit at the ends of branches and form small, branching cymes 2–5 cm long and 4–8 cm across. Their stalks are finely fuzzy. The plant flowers in spring. The blossoms are usually four-parted, 5–6 mm across, with tiny triangular sepals and bracts edged with minute hairs. Petals are narrow, 4–5 mm long, and dotted with a few clear glands. Stamens match the petals in length. The style is short (0.8 mm), soon falls off, and bears a somewhat rounded stigma divided into four lobes. The flowers are fragrant. With the exception of S. japonica var. reevesiana, the species is dioecious. The vestigial organs of the opposite sex can be prominent, especially in female flowers, the stamens of which may be almost full-sized yet remain whitish and produce no yellow, fertile pollen.

The fruits are spherical drupes 6–9 mm wide. Each contains two to five stones, each stone holding a single seed. Seeds include endosperm.

== Distribution and habitat ==
The native range of Skimmia japonica includes Japan, Taiwan, and Sakhalin. In Japan, S. japonica var. japonica grows in low-mountain forests on Honshu (from the Kanto region westward), Shikoku, and Kyushu, and can be common locally. In Japan, S. japonica var. intermedia occurs in the southern Kuriles, Hokkaido, Honshu, Shikoku and Kyushu. They grow on the floor of deciduous forests and are especially widespread in the heavy-snow regions of Hokkaido and Honshu on the Sea of Japan side. They are much less frequent in the colder, high-elevation deciduous forests of Honshu west of Kanto on the Pacific side, as well as in Shikoku and Kyushu. Beyond Japan, the variety is also found in the Kuriles and Sakhalin.

Skimmia japonica var. japonica and var. reevesiana range into the subtropics, the latter reaching the Philippines and southern Vietnam; it is also found in the Guangdong and Guangxi provinces of southern China and on Mount Omei in the Sichuan province. Skimmia japonica shares parts of its range with S. laureola subsp. laureola and Skimmia arborescens subsp. nitida; it is separated from the former by habitat altitude and possibly reproductively isolated from the latter by the difference in chromosome count.

== Varieties and cultivars ==
Skimmia japonica was the first Skimmia species to be scientifically described. Five varieties of Skimmia japonica are recognized: S. japonica var. japonica, S. japonica var. distincte-venulosa, S. japonica var. intermedia, S. japonica var. lutchuensis, and S. japonica var. orthoclada. The male and female individuals of S. japonica were originally thought to represent different species: S. fragrantissima or S. fragrans (male) and S. oblata (female).

The varieties of Skimmia japonica can be separated by growth habit and leaf size. Plants that spread rather than grow upright, reaching only 0.3–1 m in height and carrying leaves 4–7 cm long and 1.5–2.5 cm wide, belong to var. intermedia. Among these, forma repens is distinguished by flat leaves. The plants that grow erect, usually 0.6–2 m tall, and bear larger leaves 7–13 cm long and 2.5–4 cm wide fall into two groups. When the leaves are narrow—ranging from oblong-oblanceolate to narrowly obovate—and measure 2.5–3.5 cm across, the plants represent var. japonica, which extends from the southern Kuriles southward to Kyushu, including Yakushima. Plants with broader, widely oblanceolate leaves 3–6 cm wide and bisexual flowers, confined to the Ryukyu Islands, correspond to var. lutchuensis. The fruits of S. japonica are red except in S. japonica var. intermedia. f. leucocarpa, which produces white drupes.

Along with Skimmia anquetilia, S. japonica is a likely parent species of Skimmia × confusa. Another hybrid, called S. foremanii, was developed in the 1870s by the Scottish nurseryman Foreman, but has apparently not survived beyond a few generations; it was said to be a cross between S. japonica var. japonica and S. japonica var. reevesiana, but this is unlikely because the former is diploid (2n=30) and the latter tetraploid (2n=60), which would mean that the resulting hybrid would have been triploid and thus sterile.

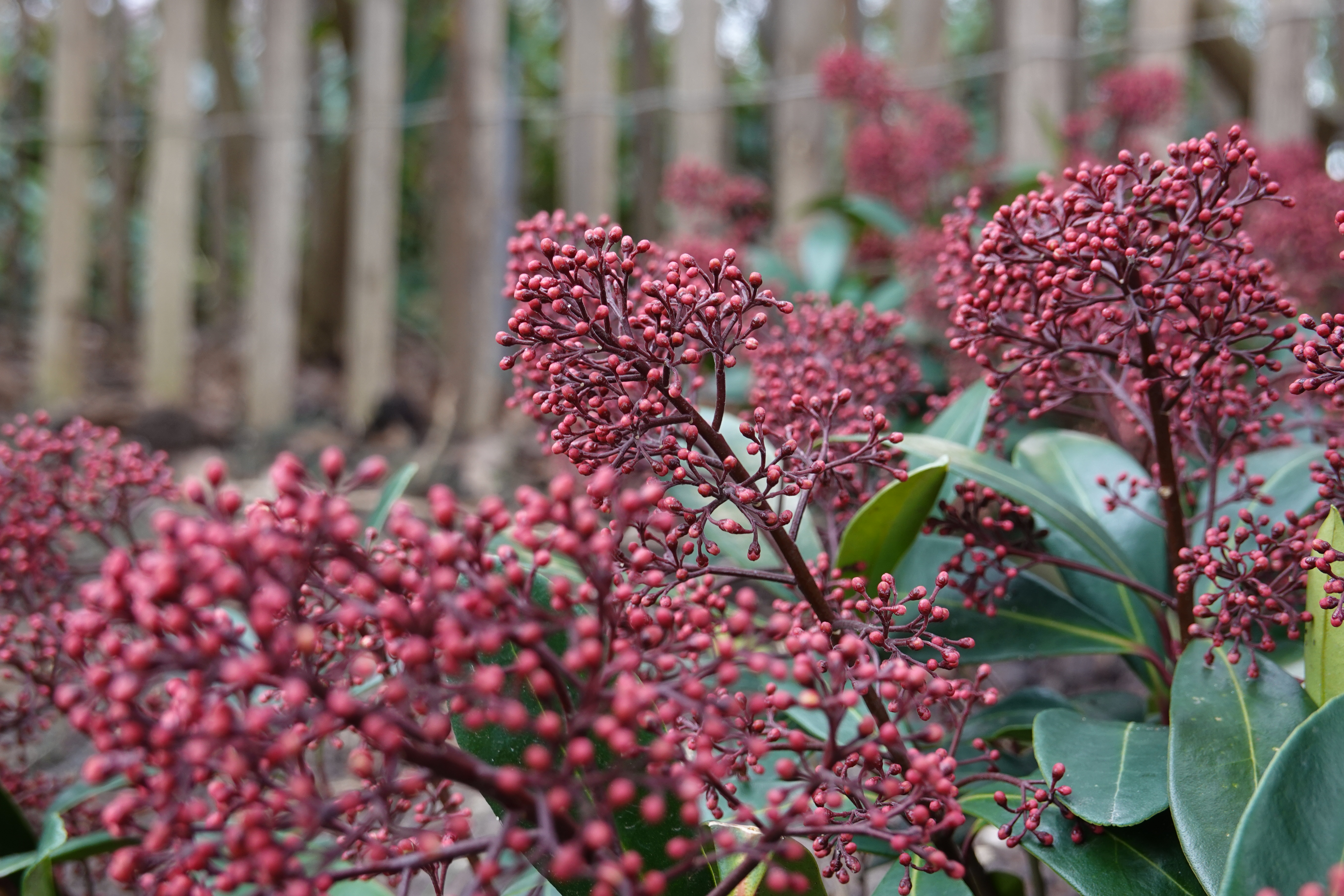
The cultivar 'Rubella' has received the Royal Horticultural Society's Award of Garden Merit.

The cultivars 'Fragrans', 'Nymans', and 'Rubella' have gained the Royal Horticultural Society's Award of Garden Merit. Other cultivars include 'Veitchii', 'Oblata', 'Macrophylla', and 'Bronze Knight'.

== Cultivation ==
Skimmia japonica is grown in shaded sites for its evergreen leaves, lightly fragrant spring flowers, and the fruit that develop on female plants in autumn. It has no notable pest or disease issues. It is suitable for shrub borders, woodland gardens, foundation plantings, hedges, and other partly shaded understory settings. It performs best in moist, humus-rich, moderately fertile soils that drain well, in conditions ranging from partial to full shade. Its leaves can scorch if exposed to full sun. S. japonica was the first member of its genus to be grown in Britain; the earliest record, referring to S. japonica var. reevesiana, is from Kew Garden in 1858.
