= Deosai National Park =

National park in Gilgit Baltistan, Pakistan

- The Land of Giant
- IUCN category Ib (wilderness area)
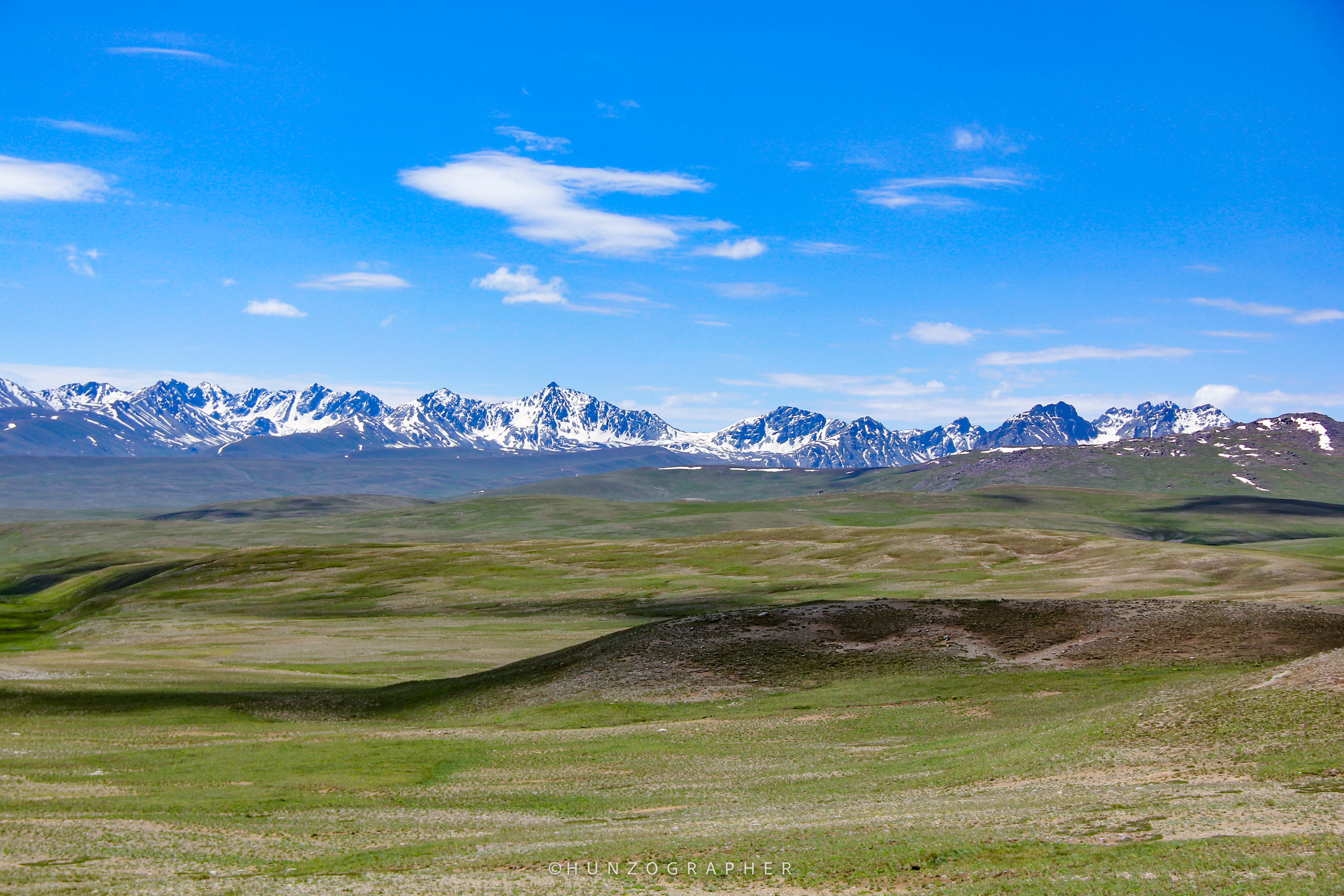
- Interactive map of Deosai National Park
- Location: Skardu and Astore Districts, Gilgit Baltistan, Pakistan
- Nearest city: Skardu and Astore
- Coordinates: 34°58′N 75°24′E
- Area: 358,400 ha (886,000 acres)
- Average elevation: 4,114 m (13,497 ft)

Deosai National Park (Urdu: دیوسائی نیشنل پارک) is a high-elevation national park located on an alpine plain between the Skardu District and Astore District in Gilgit-Baltistan, Pakistan. Lying to the east of Nanga Parbat in the western Himalayas close to the central Karakoram Range and surrounded by Deosai Mountains, the national park is in the tentative list under World Heritage Site of Pakistan.

The Deosai Plains are situated at an average elevation of 4,114 metres (13,497 ft) above sea level.

== Etymology ==
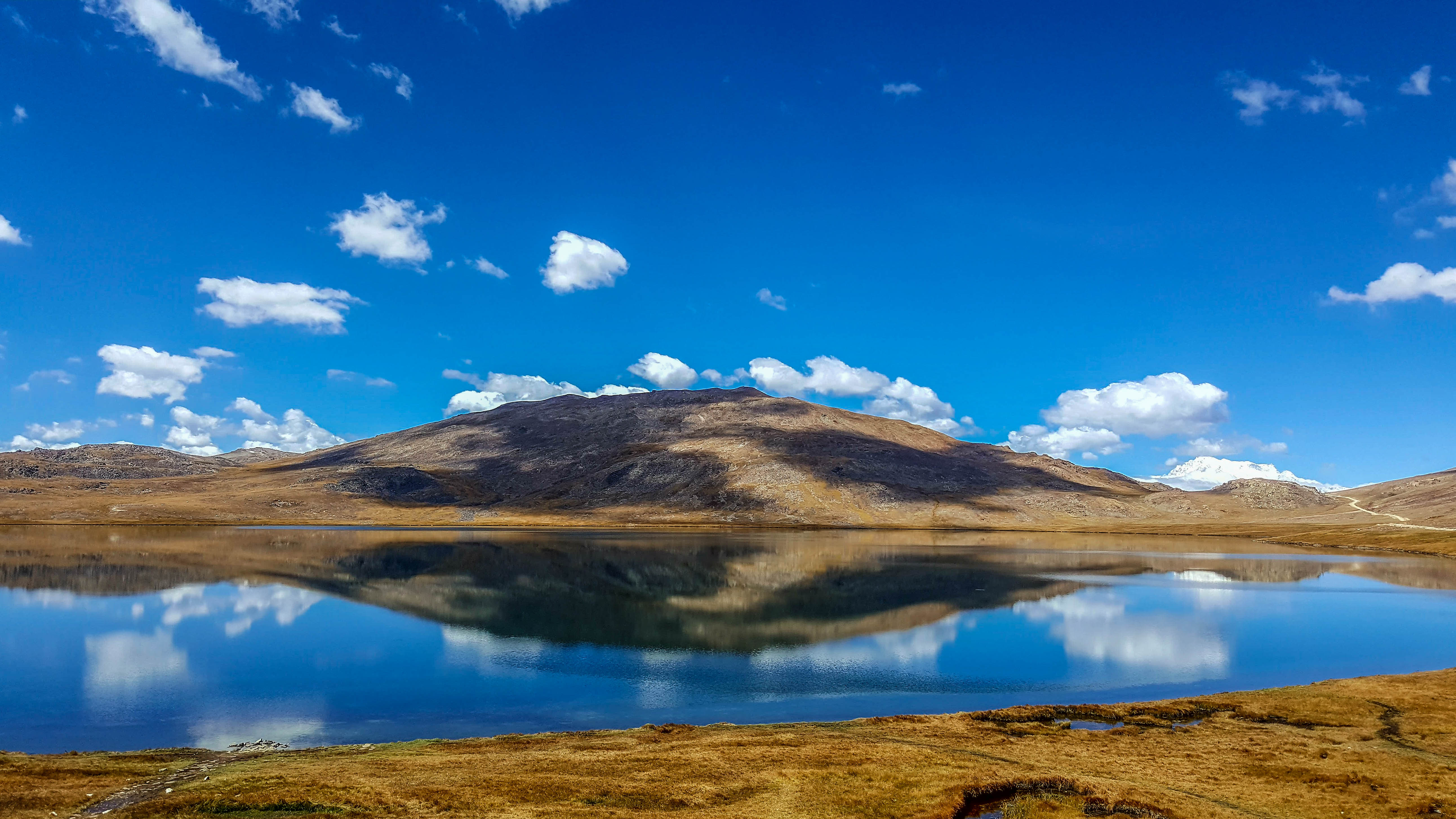
Sheosar Lake is in the western part of Deosai National Park.

'Deosai' (Shina: دیوسای٘) consists of two Shina words 'deo' ('giant') and 'sai' (shadow'), meaning the 'shadow of giant' or the 'land of giant'. The Balti people call it 'Ghbiarsa' (Balti: غبیارسہ), meaning 'summer's place', because it is only accessible in the summer.

The specific English moniker "Land of the Giant" was coined by the travel writer and historian Salman Rashid in the early 1990s to reflect this singular legend. While modern media and tourism brochures frequently pluralize the name to "Land of the Giants", historical research into the original Shina etymology and oral traditions supports the singular usage.

== Geography ==
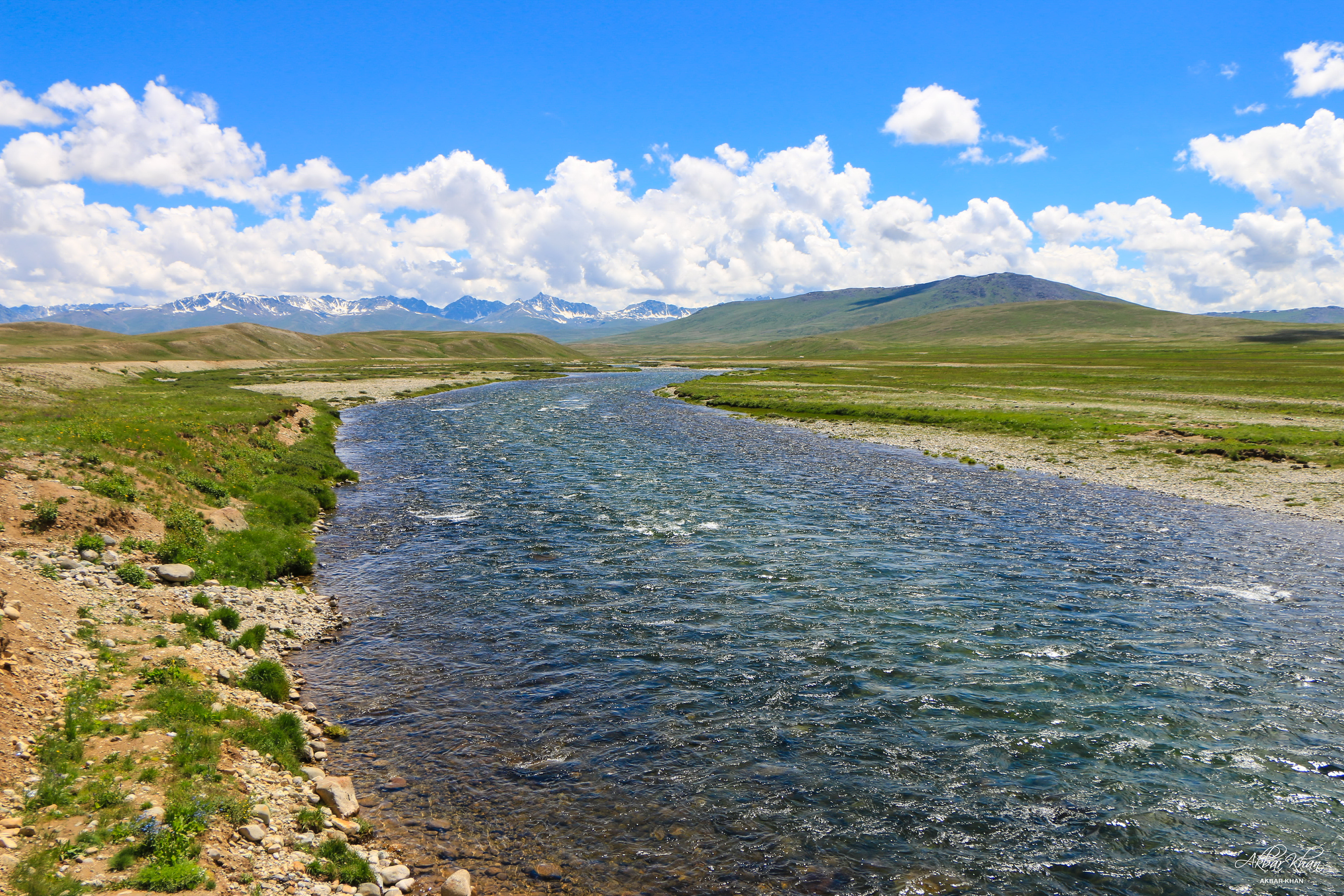
Bara Pani is the largest of the rivers that traverse Deosai National Park.

Deosai National Park is located in Western Himalayas in Gilgit Baltistan, Pakistan. It has an average elevation of 4,114 metres (13,497 ft) above sea level, making the Deosai Plains the second highest plateau in the world after Changtang Tibetan Plateau. The park protects an area of 843 square kilometres (325 mi^{2}). It is well known for its rich flora and fauna of the Karakoram-West Tibetan Plateau alpine steppe eco-region. In spring, it is covered by sweeps of wildflowers and a wide variety of butterflies.

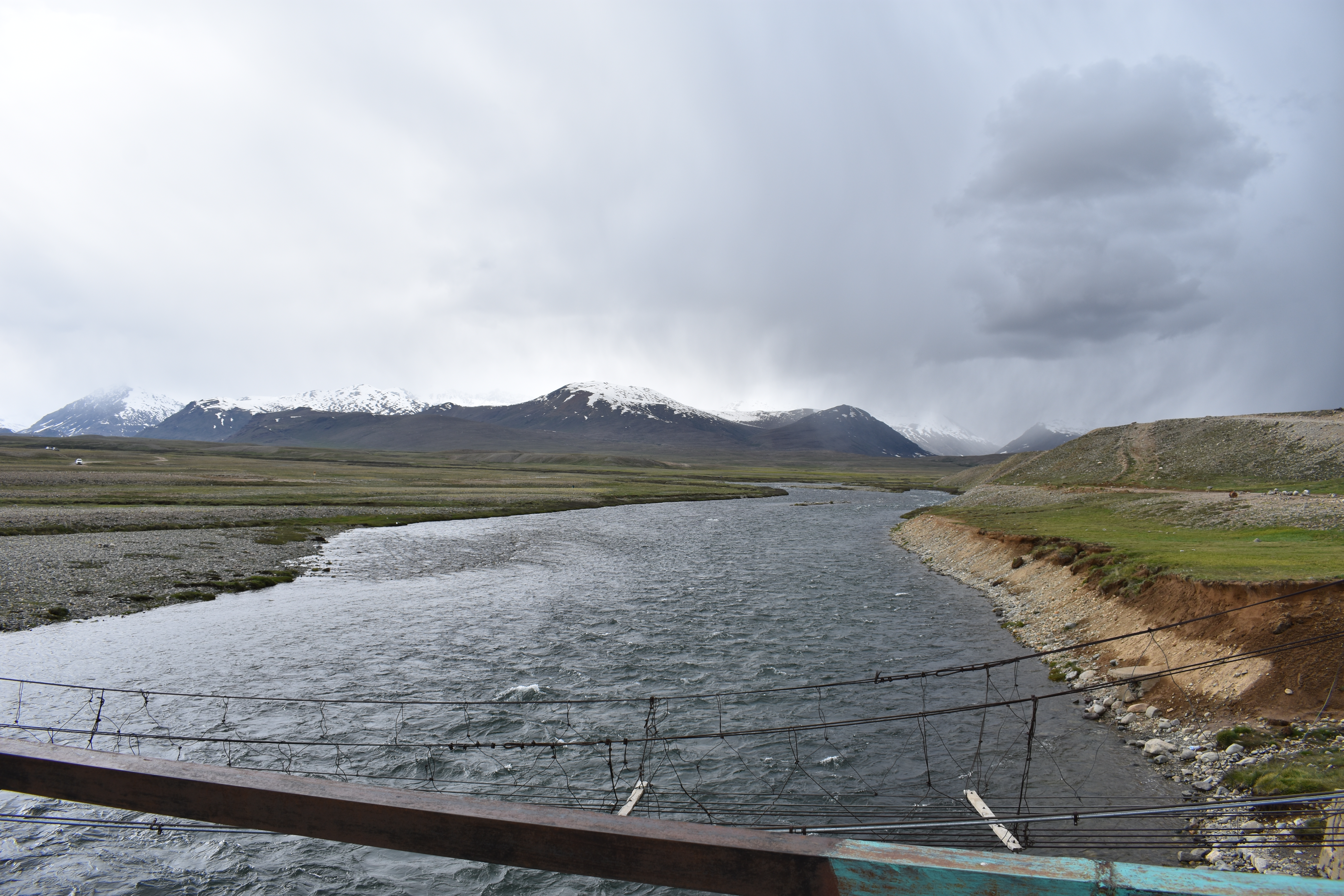
Bara Pani flowing through Deosai Plains

== Travel routes ==
Deosai is accessible from Astore District in the west, Skardu District in the north, and Galtari Tehsil of Skardu District in the south-east. It is also accessible from Mehdiabad via Mehdiabad-Dapa Road. Deosai is located approximately 30 kilometres (19 mi) from Skardu city, which is the shortest route to visit Deosai. Another route is from Astore valley via Chilim. It is also accessible from Shila valley. The people of Galtari travel via Deosai. While it is a National Park, the Gujjar-Bakwarwal travel large distances to utilize the Deosai National Park as grazing lands. There is another route called Burgy la via Burgy Nala Skardu.

== Geology and soil ==
The soils of this area are severely eroded, of a coarser nature and mixed with gravel and stones of various materials and sizes. In flat areas between mountains, soil is deep with marshy vegetation.

== Fauna and flora ==
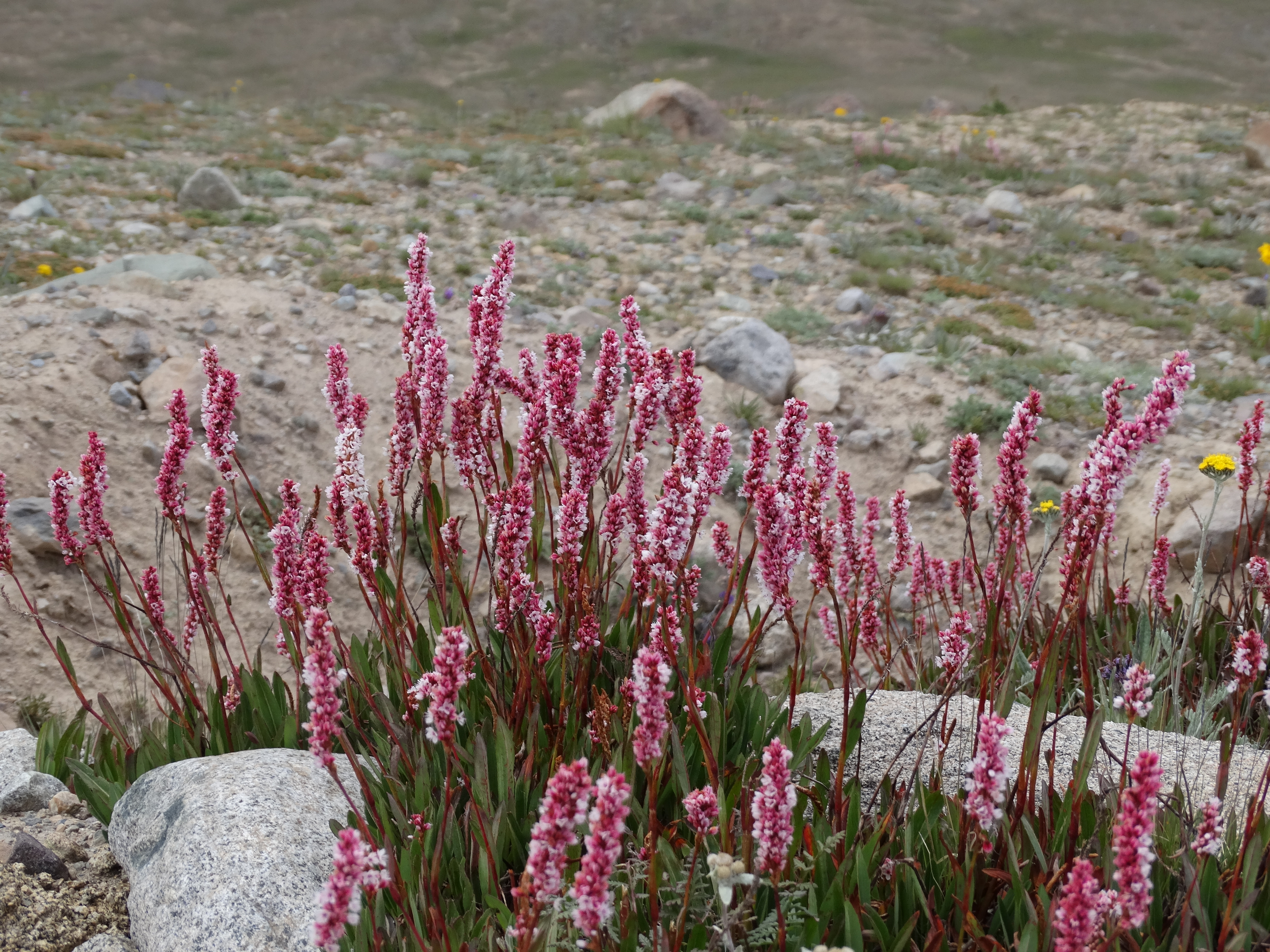
Several varieties of wildflowers grow on the plains.

The Deosai National Park was established in 1993 to protect the survival of the critically endangered Himalayan brown bear and its habitat. Having long been a prize kill for poachers and hunters, the bear now has a hope for survival in Deosai where its number has increased from only 19 in 1993, to 40 in 2005, and 78 in 2022.

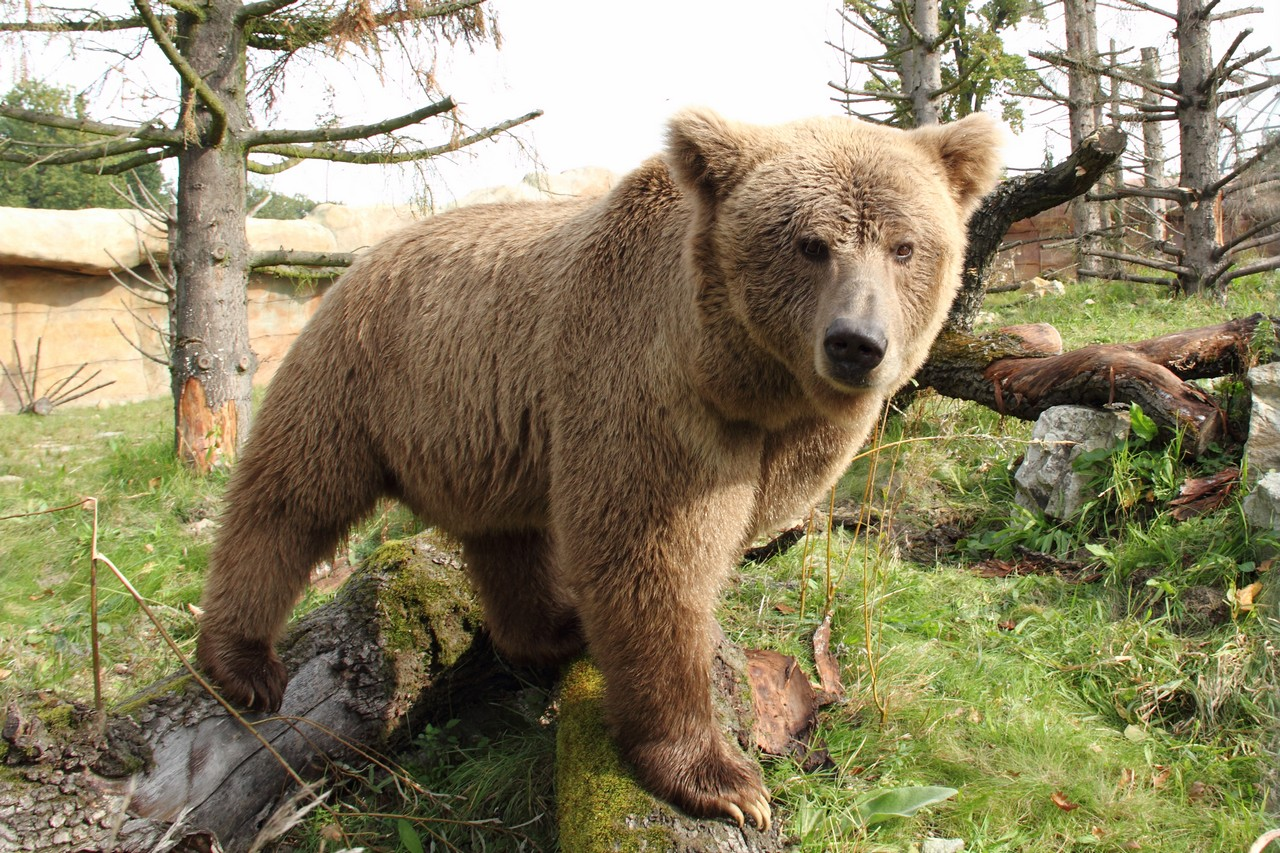
The Himalayan brown bear, a key endangered species in Deosai National Park under Sustainable Development Goal 15

In 1993, after playing an instrumental role in the designation of Deosai as a National Park, the Himalayan Wildlife Foundation (formerly the Himalayan Wildlife Project) was founded with a substantial international financial support. The Himalayan Wildlife Foundation ran two park entry check posts and a field research camp in Deosai for approximately ten years. Documentation was completed by the Himalayan Wildlife Foundation for the handover of the management of the Park to the, then, Northern Areas Forest Department with the department starting to manage the park since 2006. While pressures that existed in the 1990s, such as hunting and poaching have subsided, the brown bear is still under threat due to pressures such as climate change, and nutritional deficiencies in bears.

The Deosai Plains are also home to the Siberian ibex, Snow Leopard, Kashmir Musk Deer, Himalayan wolf, Himalayan marmot and over 124 types of resident and migratory birds. Birds in the park include the Golden eagle, Lammergeier, Himalayan vulture, Laggar falcon, Peregrine falcon, Eurasian kestrel, Eurasian sparrowhawk, and Himalayan snowcock. The plains are recognised under IUCN protected area category Ib as wilderness area.

The following plant species are found in Deosai:

Polygonum affine, Thalictrum alpinum, Bromus oxyodon, Saxifraga flagellaris, Androsace mucronifolia, Aster flaccidus, Barbarea vulgaris, Artemisia maritima, Elymus longiaristatus, Nepeta connata, Carex cruenta, Ranunculus laetus, Arenaria neelgherrensis, Astragalus leucocephalus, Polygonum amplexinade, Echinops niveus, Senecio chrysanthemoides, Artemisia spp., Dracocephalum nutans, Taxus contorta, Chrysopogon gryllus subsp. echinulatus and Dianthus crinitus. There were also observed some medicinal plants which are locally famous i.e. Thymus linearis (Reetumburuk), Saussurea lappa (kuth), Ephedra gerardiana (Say), Viola pilosa (Skora-mindoq), Pleurospermum candollei (Shamdun) and Artemisia brevifolia (Bursay) etc. which are used as traditional drug therapies.

== Cultural references ==
=== Herodotus ===
Research by the French ethnologist Michel Peissel makes a claim that the story of 'Gold-digging ants' reported by the Greek historian Herodotus, who lived in the 5th century BC, was founded on the golden Himalayan Marmot of the Deosai plateau and the habit of local tribes such as Minaro to collect the gold dust excavated from their burrows.

=== In film ===
- The documentary film series Land of the Tiger in episode 5, the "Mountains of the Gods", features the plants and animals of Deosai.
- Karakoram Heliski 2013 by Walkabout Films
- DEOSAI - The Last Sanctuary by Walkabout Films
- Deosai – Wilderness in Peril by UNDP and Walkabout Films

== See also ==
- Karakoram
- Gilgit
- Baltistan
