= Himalayan Wildlife Foundation =

Pakistan based NGO

- Abbreviation: HWF
- Formation: 1994
- Type: NGO
- Purpose: Conservation
- Location: Islamabad, Pakistan
- Key people: Vaqar Zakaria, Anis Ur Rehman, Fareeha Ovais, Bilal Khan
- Affiliations: Hagler Bailly Pakistan
- Website: hwf.org.pk
- Formerly called: Himalayan Wildlife Project

The Himalayan Wildlife Foundation (HWF), previously called the Himalayan Wildlife Project, is a nonprofit, non-governmental organization based in Islamabad Pakistan focused on conservation of biodiversity and cultural heritage in Pakistan. The Himalayan Wildlife Foundation is widely attributed to have saved the Himalayan Brown Bear from extinction in Pakistan, although it is not yet clear whether enough genetic diversity is available within the current population to sustain the population. The HWF is also involved in other major conservation efforts such as Rohtas Fort Conservation Programme at Rohtas Fort, and community-based management interventions in Gumot National Park, Musk Deer National Park and Neelum Valley in Azad Jammu and Kashmir. Efforts of the Himalayan Wildlife Foundation in Pakistan are considered some of the leading efforts in conservation and socioeconomic development in the Himalaya.

== Management of Deosai National Park ==
In 1993 the Himalayan Wildlife Project — later renamed Himalayan Wildlife Foundation (HWF) — established a research camp in Deosai, following a realization by Mr Vaqar Zakaria and Dr Anis Ur Rehman who had not found any bears in Deosai on a visit in 1987. This was the first time that the bears of Deosai became the subject of scientific inquiry and census in Pakistan. Investigations revealed that Deosai was home to just 19 bears, a much smaller number than claimed by the Wildlife Department of Gilgit-Baltistan.

Realizing the importance of conserving these precious few bears as well as other mammals, various species of migratory birds and a great variety of flora, the Himalayan Wildlife Project, led by Dr Anis Ur Rehman and Mr Vaqar Zakaria, made efforts to get the unique high altitude plateau declared a national park. The same year, the boundary of the Deosai National Park was demarcated and the area received officially protected status.

The Himalayan Wildlife Foundation, following the declaration of Deosai as a National Park, with support of the Wildlife Department, managed the national park through contributions of various donors, including multiple donations by the Global Environment Facility Small Grants Programme, for approximately ten years.

In 2001, the HWF field staff, including field managers and guards were inducted into the Wildlife Department of the Government of Gilgit-Baltistan. During the time that HWF managed the National Park, both Vaqar Zakaria and Dr Anis Ur Rehman, as well as the park staff received blatant threats, when confronting illegal poachers

Research efforts on the population and status of the Himalayan Brown Bear continued through to 2001 with support of the Himalayan Wildlife Foundation and their 20 strong wildlife guards. The research by the Himalayan Wildlife Foundation was supported by a research consulting company, Hagler Bailly Pakistan, through provision of resources including research staff at their office in Islamabad where Mr Vaqar Zakaria was working. The effort of the Himalayan Wildlife Foundation, park staff that conducted various surveys including annual census of bears, along with research effort of Dr Ali Nawaz, a conservation biologist at Hagler Bailly Pakistan at the time and later as a pHD researcher, culminated in multiple research papers on the status and genetic diversity of the brown bears of Deosai.

=== Current Involvement ===
The Himalayan Wildlife Foundation is not currently involved in the day-to-day management of the Deosai National Park. It has maintained broader involvement in broader policy interventions in the National Park. More recently, given issues with communities of Gujjar-bakarwal (nomadic herders) who travel very long distances to utilize the summer pastures of Deosai National Park from the Pir Panjal and who are considered to have usufruct rights to grazing lands within the national park from before it was formed, the Himalayan Wildlife Foundation has carried out further study and research into community-led conservation supported by the Global Environment Facility Small Grants Programme.

== Other Initiatives ==
The Himalayan Wildlife Foundation also conceived and ran the Rohtas Fort Conservation Programme at Rohtas Fort, Punjab, Pakistan. The Himalayan Wildlife Foundation is also involved in conservation efforts in the Jammu and Kashmir region administered by Pakistan. These include conservation initiative in the Gumot National Park, Musk Deer National Park and Neelum Valley.
