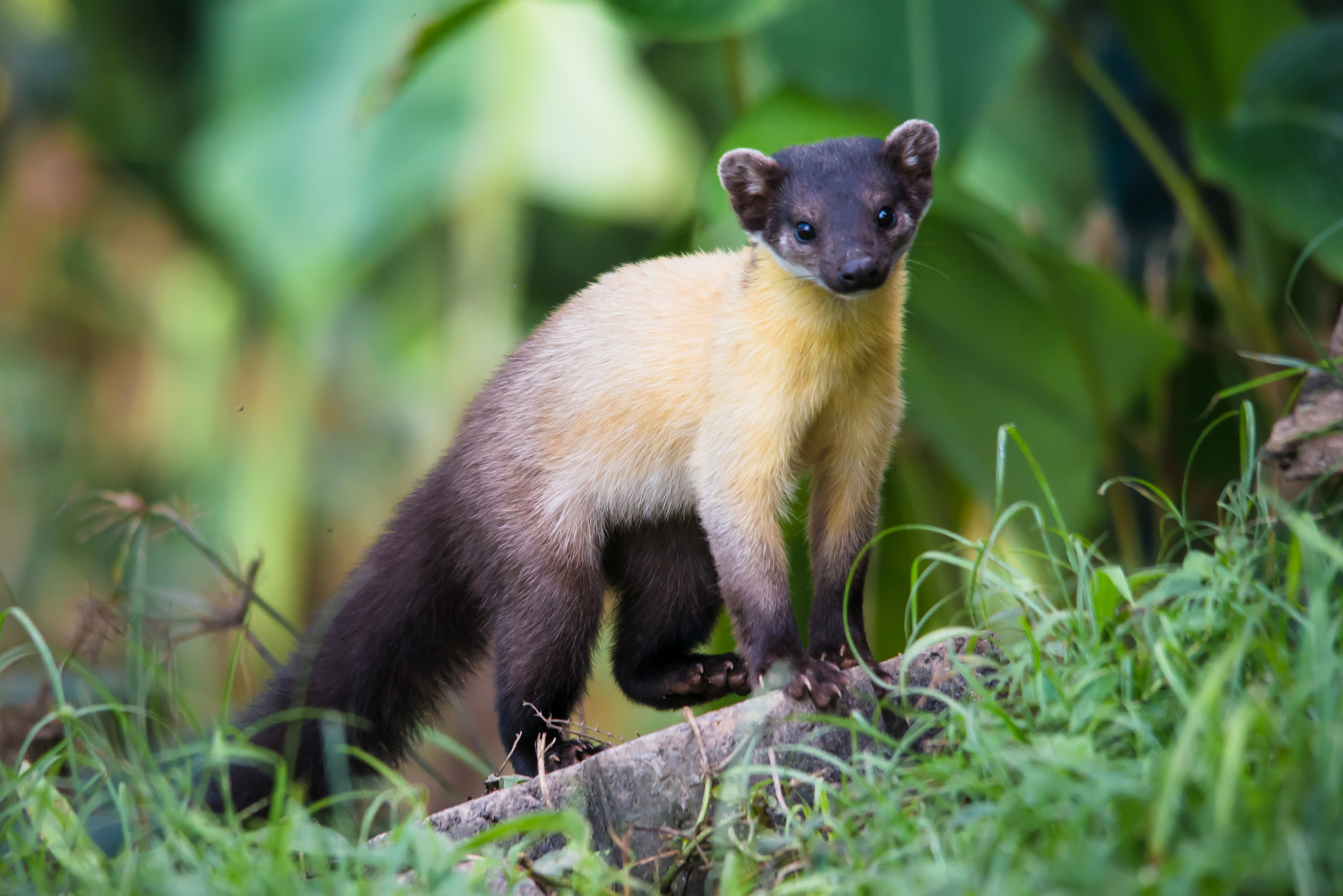
- Martes flavigula indochinensis Kaeng Krachan National Park

Conservation status
- Least Concern (IUCN 3.1)
- CITES Appendix III

Scientific classification
- Kingdom: Animalia
- Phylum: Chordata
- Class: Mammalia
- Order: Carnivora
- Family: Mustelidae
- Genus: Martes
- Species: M. flavigula

Binomial name
- Martes flavigula Boddaert, 1785

Subspecies
- M. f. flavigula (Boddaert, 1785); M. f. chrysospila (Pocock, 1936); M. f. robinsoni
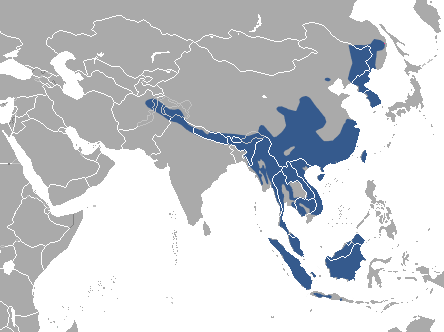
- Yellow-throated marten range

Synonyms
- Charronia flavigula (Boddaert)

= Yellow-throated marten =

Yellow-throated marten Temporal range: Pliocene – Recent

Species of carnivore

The yellow-throated marten (Martes flavigula) is a marten species native to the Himalayas, Southeast and East Asia. Its coat is bright yellow-golden, and its head and back are distinctly darker, blending together black, white, golden-yellow and brown. It is the second-largest marten in the Old World, after the Nilgiri marten, with its tail making up more than half its body length.

It is an omnivore, whose sources of food range from fruit and nectar to invertebrates, rodents, lagomorphs, reptiles and birds, and to small primates and ungulates. It is listed as least concern on the IUCN Red List due to its wide distribution, stable population, occurrence in a number of protected areas and an apparent lack of threats.

== Description ==
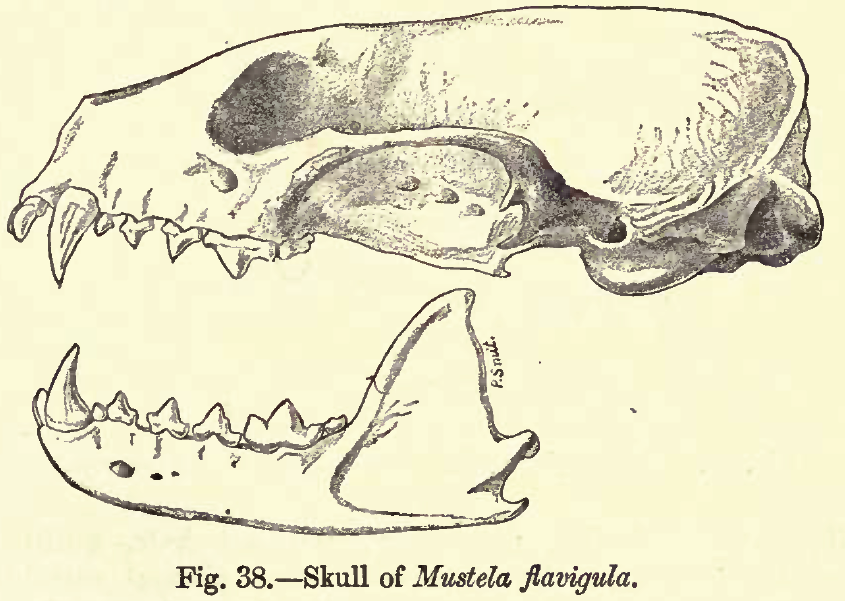
Illustration of a skull in Blanford's Fauna of British India

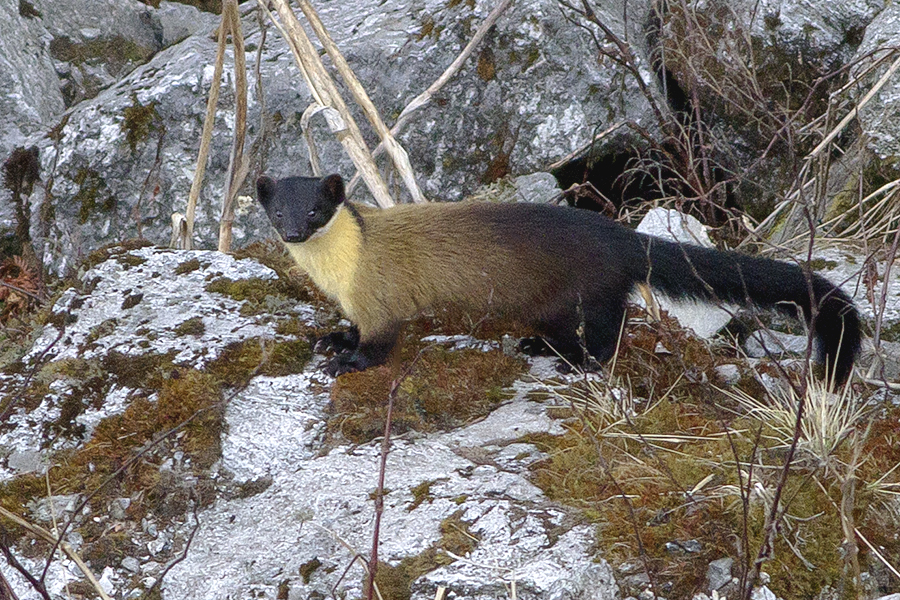
An individual in Pangolakha Wildlife Sanctuary

The yellow-throated marten has short bright brownish-yellow fur, a blackish brown pointed head, reddish cheeks, light brown chin and lower lips; the chest and lower part of the throat are orange-golden, and flanks and belly are bright yellowish. The back of the ears is black, the inner portions are yellowish grey. The front paws, lower forelimbs are black. The tail is black above with a greyish brown base and a lighter tip. It is robust and muscular, has an elongated thorax, a long neck and a long tail, which is about 2/3 as long as its body. The limbs are relatively short and strong, with broad paws. The ears are large and broad with rounded tips. The soles of the feet are covered with coarse, flexible hairs, though the digital and foot pads are naked and the paws are weakly furred. The baculum is S-shaped, with four blunt processes occurring on the tip. It is larger than other Old World martens; males measure 50–72 cm (20–28 in) in body length, while females measure 50–62 cm (20–24 in). Males weigh 2.5–5.7 kg (5.5–12.6 lb), while females weigh 1.6–3.8 kg (3.5–8.4 lb). The anal glands sport two unusual protuberances, which secrete a strong smelling liquid for defensive purposes.

== Distribution and habitat ==
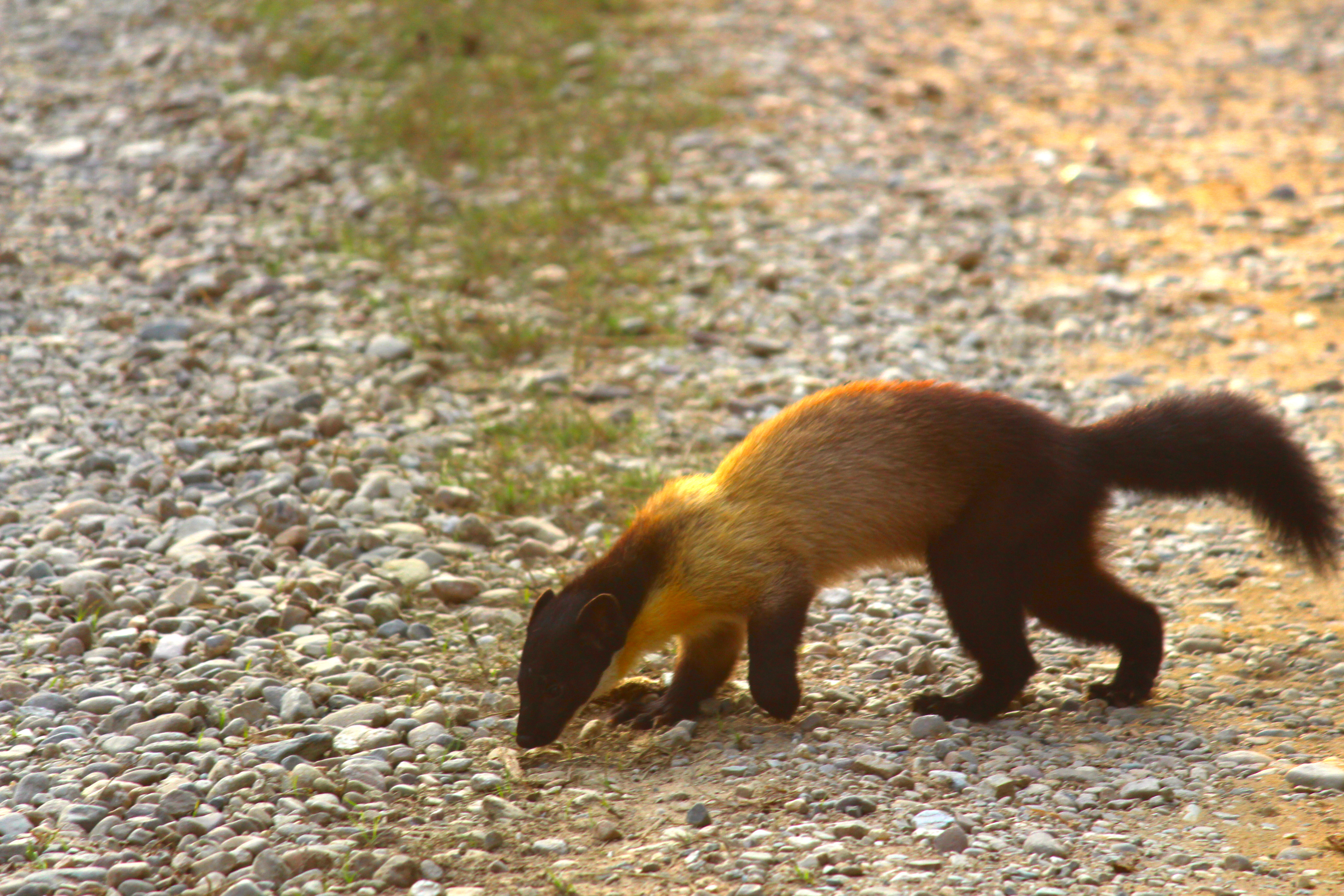
Yellow-throated marten in Jim Corbett National Park, India

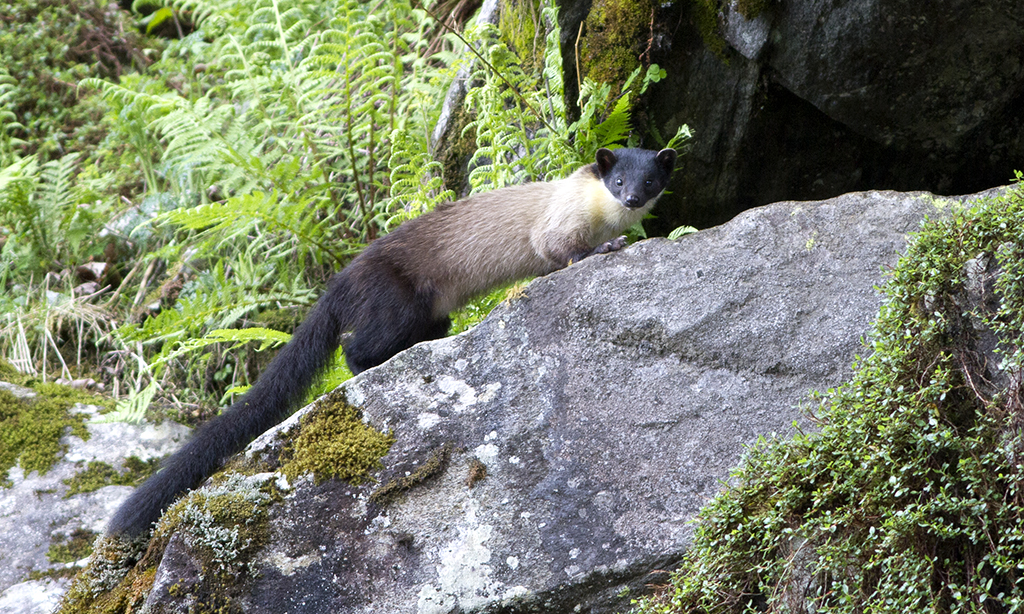
Photographed in Tungnath

The yellow-throated marten occurs in Afghanistan and Pakistan, in the Himalayas of India, Nepal and Bhutan, continental southern China and Taiwan, the Korean Peninsula and eastern Russia. In the south, its range extends to Bangladesh, Myanmar, Thailand, the Malay Peninsula, Laos, Cambodia and Vietnam.

In Pakistan, it was recorded in Musk Deer National Park and sighted in the Margalla Hills. In Nepal's Kanchenjunga Conservation Area, it has been recorded up to an elevation of 4,510 m (14,800 ft) in alpine meadow.

In northeastern India, it has been reported in northern West Bengal, Arunachal Pradesh, Manipur and Assam. In Indonesia it occurs in Borneo, Sumatra, and Java.

== Behaviour and ecology ==
The yellow-throated marten holds extensive, but not permanent, home ranges. It actively patrols its territory, having been known to cover 10–20 km (6.2–12.4 mi) in a single day and night. It primarily hunts on the ground, but can climb trees proficiently, being capable of making jumps up to 8–9 m (26–30 ft) between branches. After March snowfalls, the yellow-throated marten restricts its activities to treetops.

=== Diet ===
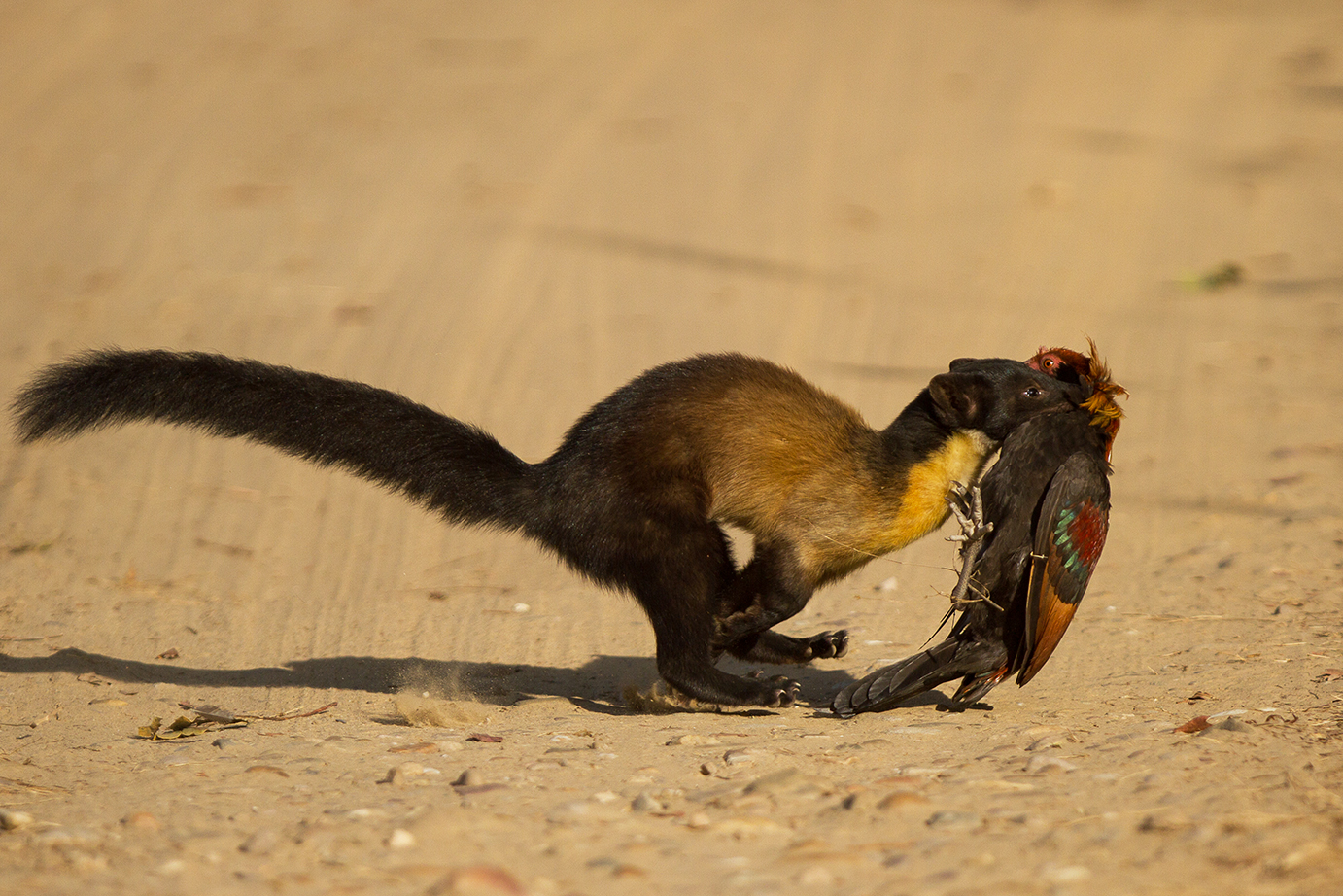
Yellow-throated marten with red jungle fowl kill in Corbett National Park

The yellow-throated marten is a diurnal hunter, which usually hunts in pairs, but may also hunt in packs of three or more. It preys on rats, mice, hares, snakes, lizards, eggs and ground nesting birds such as pheasants and francolins. It is reported to kill cats and poultry. It has been known to feed on human corpses, and was once thought to be able to attack an unarmed man in groups of three to four. It preys on small ungulates and smaller marten species, such as sables. In the Himalayas and Myanmar, it is reported to frequently kill muntjac fawns, while in Ussuriland the base of its diet consists of musk deer, particularly in winter. Two or three yellow-throated martens can consume a musk deer carcass in 2 to 3 days. It also kills the young of larger ungulate species within a weight range of 10–12 kg (22–26 lb), including young spotted deer, roe deer and goral. Wild boar piglets are also taken on occasion. It has also been reported to trail tigers and feed on their kills. In China, it preys on giant panda cubs.

It supplements its diet with nectar and fruit, and is therefore considered to be an important seed disperser.

=== Reproduction ===
Estrus occurs twice a year, from mid-February to late March and from late June to early August. During these periods, the males fight each other for access to females. They usually give birth in very secured places, away from hawks and other predators . The pair guard alternatively the place and often change the place to hide the newborn/s. In Chopta forest one such Yellow throated marten was photographed with a just-born cub in mouth on a high tree top by a Bengali Wildlife photographer (Koushik Ranjan Das) and the photo was exhibited in an exhibition (by Lensnwings of Kolkata) on January 2024. Probably this is the first ever taken such photo of just-born cub of Yellow throated marten in the world exhibited for public view.

Yellow throated marten from Chopta - November 2023

Litters typically consist of two or three and rarely four.

=== Predators ===
The yellow-throated marten has few predators, but occasionally may fall foul of larger carnivores; remains of sporadic individuals have turned up in the scat or stomachs of Siberian tigers (Panthera tigris) and Asian black bears (Ursus thibetanus). A mountain hawk-eagle (Nisaetus nipalensis) killed an adult yellow-throated marten.

== Conservation ==
The yellow-throated marten is listed as least concern on the IUCN Red List due to its wide distribution and occurrence in protected areas across its range; the global population is stable, and threats are apparently lacking.

== Taxonomy ==
The first written description of the yellow-throated marten in the Western World is given by Thomas Pennant in his History of Quadrupeds (1781), in which he named it "White-cheeked Weasel". Pieter Boddaert featured it in his Elenchus Animalium with the name Mustela flavigula. For a long period after the Elenchus' publication, the existence of the yellow-throated marten was considered doubtful by many zoologists, until a skin was presented to the Museum of the East India Company in 1824 by Thomas Hardwicke.

=== Subspecies ===
As of 2026, ten subspecies are recognized.

Subspecies	Trinomial authority	Description	Range	Synonyms
Indian kharza (M. f. flavigula) (Nominate subspecies)	Bodaert, 1785	A large subspecies distinguished by the absence of a naked area of skin above the plantar pad of the hind foot, a larger mat of hair between the plantar and carpal pads of the forefoot and by its longer, more luxuriant winter coat	Jammu & Kashmir eastwards through Northern India, the Himalayas to Assam, upper Burma, and southeastern Tibet and southern Kham	chrysogaster (C. E. H. Smith, 1842) hardwickei (Horsfield, 1828) kuatunensis (Bonhote, 1901) leucotis (Bechstein, 1800) melina (Kerr, 1792) melli (Matschie, 1922) quadricolor (Shaw, 1800) szetchuensis (Hilzheimer, 1910) typica (Bonhote, 1901) yuenshanensis (Shih, 1930)
Siberian yellow-throated marten (M. f. aterrima)	Pallas, 1811		Primorsky Krai, China and Mongolia	Viverra aterrima (Pallas, 1811)
Amur yellow-throated marten (M. f. borealis)	Radde, 1862	Distinguished from flavigula by its denser and longer winter fur and somewhat larger general dimensions.	Amur and Primorsky Krais, former Manchuria and the Korean Peninsula	koreana (Mori, 1922)
Formosan yellow-throated marten (M. f. chrysospila)	Swinhoe, 1866		Taiwan	xanthospila (Swinhoe, 1870)
Hainan yellow-throated marten (M. f. hainana)	Hsu and Wu, 1981		Hainan island	
Sumatran yellow-throated marten (M. f. henrici)	Schinz, 1845		Sumatra	
Indochinese yellow-throated marten (M. f. indochinensis)	Kloss, 1916	Distinguished from flavigula by the presence of a naked area of skin above the plantar pad of the hind feet and the area between the plantar and carpal pads on the forefeet. The winter coat is shorter and less luxuriant, with the color being paler, rather yellower on the shoulders and upper back, the loins are less deeply pigmented and the nape is more profusely speckled with yellow. The belly is a dirty white in color and the throat pale yellow.	Northern Tenasserim, Thailand and Vietnam	
Malaysian yellow-throated marten (M. f. peninsularis)	Bonhote, 1901	Similar to indochinensis, but distinguished by its brown, rather than black, head, with the nape being the same color as the shoulders, being usually buff or yellowish brown. The shoulders and upper back are not as yellow as in indochinensis and the abdomen is always darkish brown, while the throat varies from orange-yellow to cream. The fur is short and thin	Southern Tenasserim and the Malay Peninsula	
Javan yellow-throated marten (M. f. robinsoni)	Pocock, 1936		western Java	
Bornean yellow-throated marten (M. f. saba)	Chasen and Kloss, 1931		Borneo	
