= Gurez National Park =

National park in Pakistan

Coordinates: 34°43′48″N 74°47′06″E

The Gurez National Park, also known as Musk Deer National Park, is one of the protected areas of Pakistan. It is located in Neelum District in Azad kashmir, Pakistan, besides the Neelum River in the Gurez valley. It is located in the high Himalayas and Pir Panjal Range. It is a thirty-five minute drive from Gurez tehsil. It is also known as Gurez valley national park.

== Location ==
The Gurez national park is located in Neelum District, and consists of the easternmost portion of the district, amounting to 14.5% of its territory. It is a thirty minute drive from Neelum town. It is nestles among the Pir Panjal Range and the Lower Himalayan Range in the Himalayan foothills.

== Geography ==
The park is located in the high Himalayan foothills of north-western. There are rugged mountain tracts rising up to an elevation of 3,000m above sea level. The average elevation mainly ranges from 1,500-3,000m. Natural freshwater streams feed the Neelum River, which runs across the Gurez valley. It was notified as a national park in 2007, and is managed by the Himalayan Wildlife Foundation. The park covers a total area of 52,815 ha (528.15 km^{2}).

== Flora ==
The habitat here consists entirely of Western Himalayan subalpine conifer forests, covered mainly by trees such as Blue pine, deodar and Betula utilis, Picea smithiana, Abies pindrow along with some of the last stands of the endangered Taxus wallichiana or Himalayan yew. Common flowering plants include Rosa moschata and herbs and grasses such as Skimmia laureola and Sinopodophyllum which make up the flora of the lower slopes.

== Fauna ==
The national park was established to protect the endangered musk deer. In total it is home to some 19 mammals, 100 birds and a few reptiles. The Himalayan musk deer is found here and the total population could possibly cross 50 individuals. Major mammal species of the park include:

- Indian leopard, Panthera pardus millardi
- Snow leopard, Panthera uncia
- Leopard cat, Prionaillurus bengalensis bengalensis
- Himalayan brown bear, Ursus arctos isabellinus
- Himalayan black bear, Ursus thibetanus laniger
- Himalayan wolf, Canis lupus chanco
- Yellow-throated marten, Martes flavigula flavigula
- Beech marten, Martes foina
- Red giant flying squirrel, Petaurista petaurista albiventer
- Long-tailed marmot, Marmota caudata aurea
- Kashmir stag, Cervus elaphus hanglu
- Himalayan musk deer, Moschus leucogaster
- Kashmir musk deer, Moschus cupreus

Birds of the park include:

- Himalayan snowcock, Tetrrogallus himalayensis
- Himalayan monal, Lophophorus imejanus
- Koklass pheasant, Pucrasia malphora
- Himalayan vulture, Gyps himlayensis

Reptiles include Laudakia agrorensis and Laudakia tuberculata.
