= Skimmia anquetilia =

Scientific classification
- Kingdom: Plantae
- Clade: Tracheophytes
- Clade: Angiosperms
- Clade: Eudicots
- Clade: Rosids
- Order: Sapindales
- Family: Rutaceae
- Genus: Skimmia
- Species: S. anquetilia

Binomial name
- Skimmia anquetilia N. P. Taylor & Airy Shaw

Species of shrub

Skimmia anquetilia is a species of shrub that is cultivated for its decorative fruits and bright pink flowers. It is grown mainly in gardens. It can tolerate frost. Several cultivars were created from this species. It is native to the Himalayas. It has been hybridized with Skimmia japonica to make Skimmia × confusa. The leaves of Skimmia anquetilia have anti-inflammatory properties. The plant is used in traditional medicine.
