= Skimmia arborescens =

Conservation status
- Least Concern (IUCN 3.1)

Scientific classification
- Kingdom: Plantae
- Clade: Tracheophytes
- Clade: Angiosperms
- Clade: Eudicots
- Clade: Rosids
- Order: Sapindales
- Family: Rutaceae
- Genus: Skimmia
- Species: S. arborescens

Binomial name
- Skimmia arborescens T. Anderson ex Gamble

Synonyms
- Skimmia euphlebia Merrill; Skimmia japonica var. euphlebia (Merrill) N. P. Taylor; Skimmia japonica var. kwangsiensis (C. C. Huang) N. P. Taylor; Skimmia kwangsiensis C. C. Huang.

Species of shrub

Skimmia arborescens, also known as qiao mu yin yu (Chinese: 乔木茵芋), is a species of plant in the family Rutaceae. It is widely distributed in Asia, occurring in Bhutan, China (Guangdong, Guangxi, Guizhou, Sichuan, Tibet, Yunnan), Hong Kong, India, Laos, Myanmar, Nepal, Thailand, and Vietnam.
