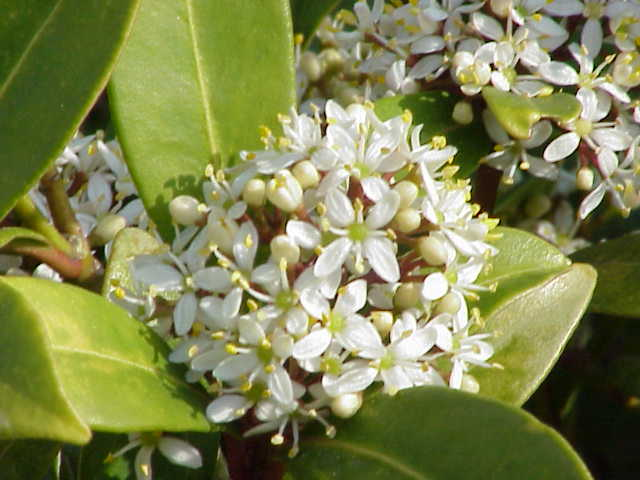
- Skimmia japonica subsp. reevesiana

Scientific classification
- Kingdom: Plantae
- Clade: Tracheophytes
- Clade: Angiosperms
- Clade: Eudicots
- Clade: Rosids
- Order: Sapindales
- Family: Rutaceae
- Subfamily: Zanthoxyloideae
- Genus: Skimmia; Thunb.

Species
- See text.

= Skimmia =

Genus of shrubs native to Asia

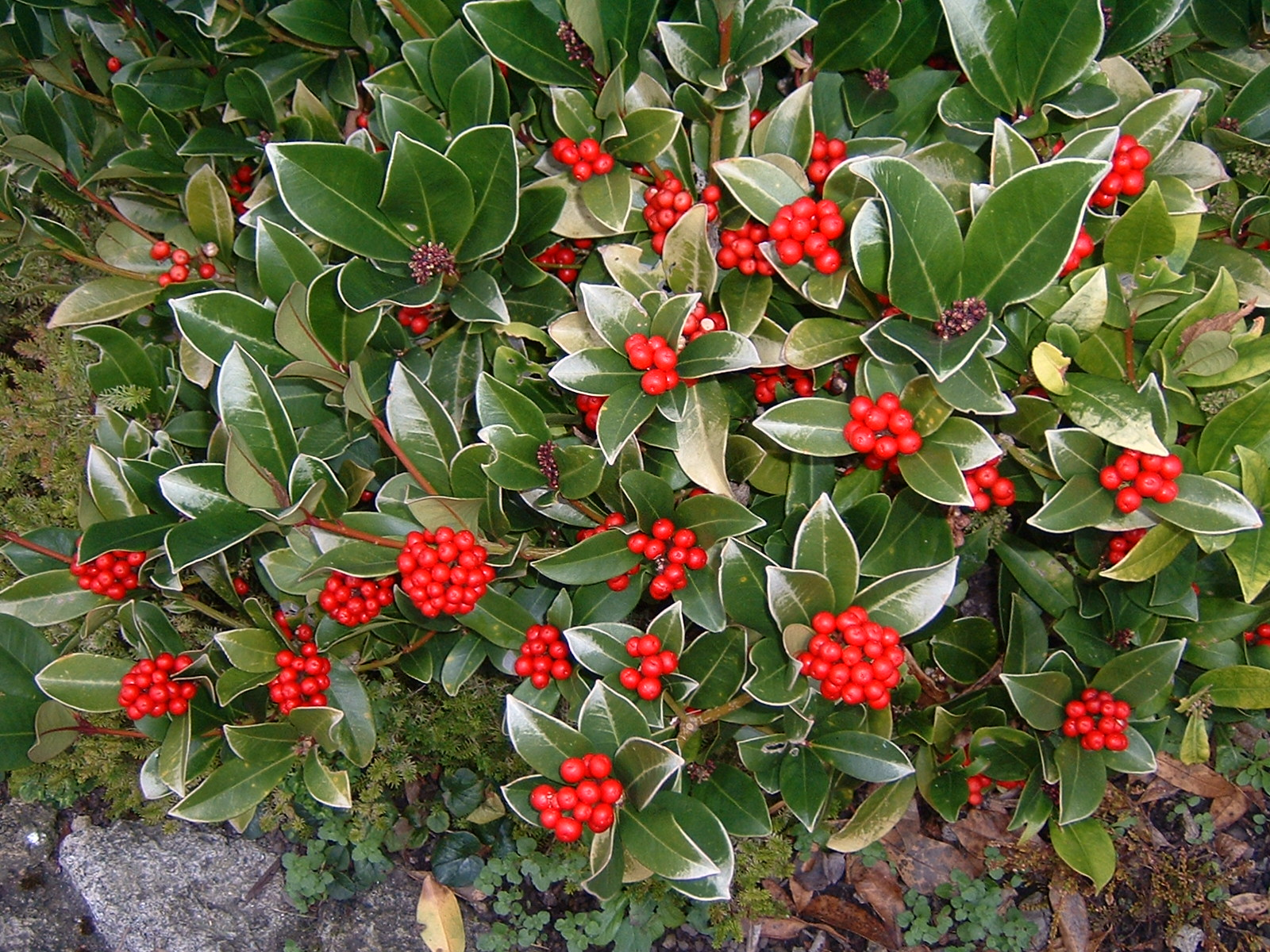
Skimmia with berries

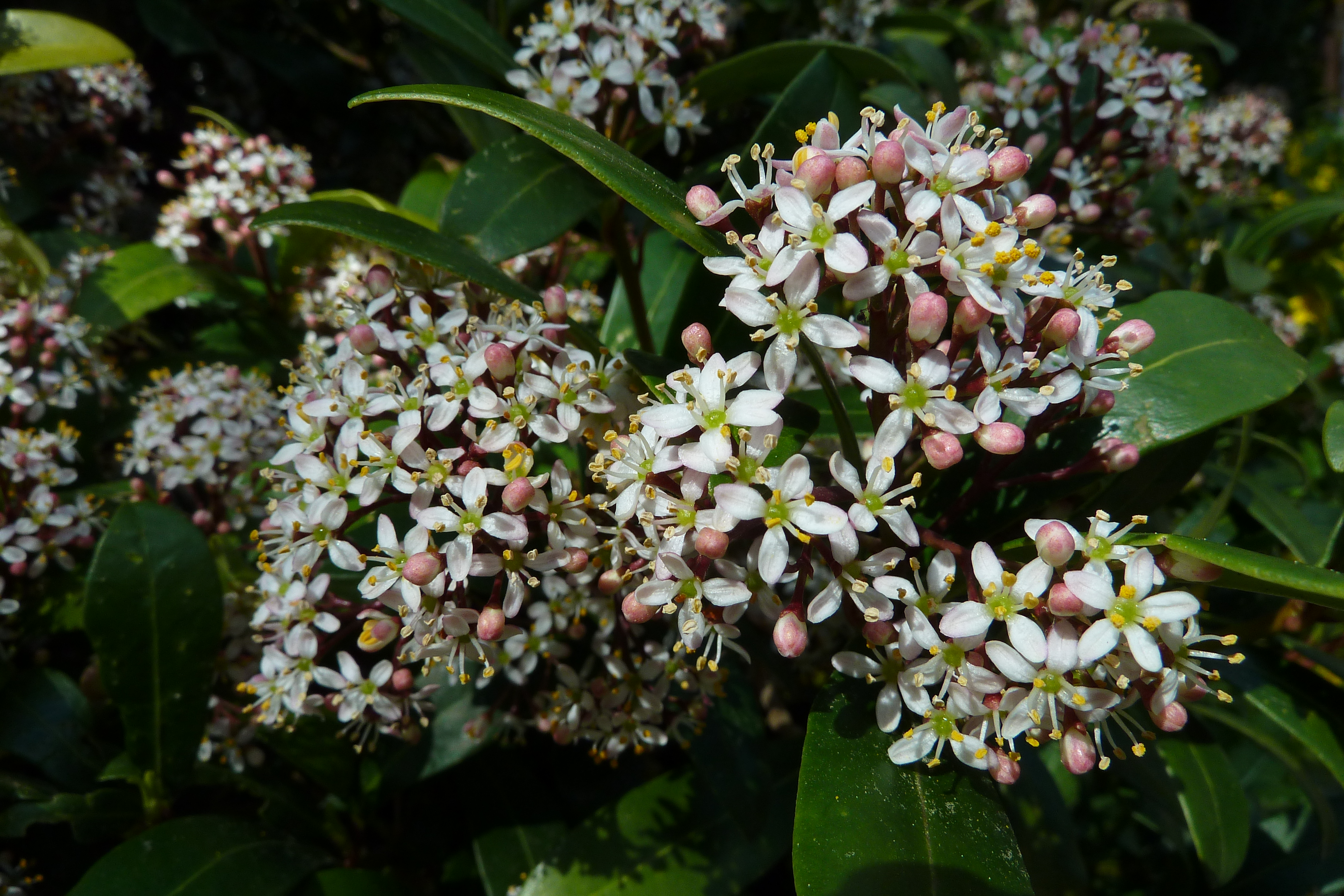
Skimmia japonica in blossom

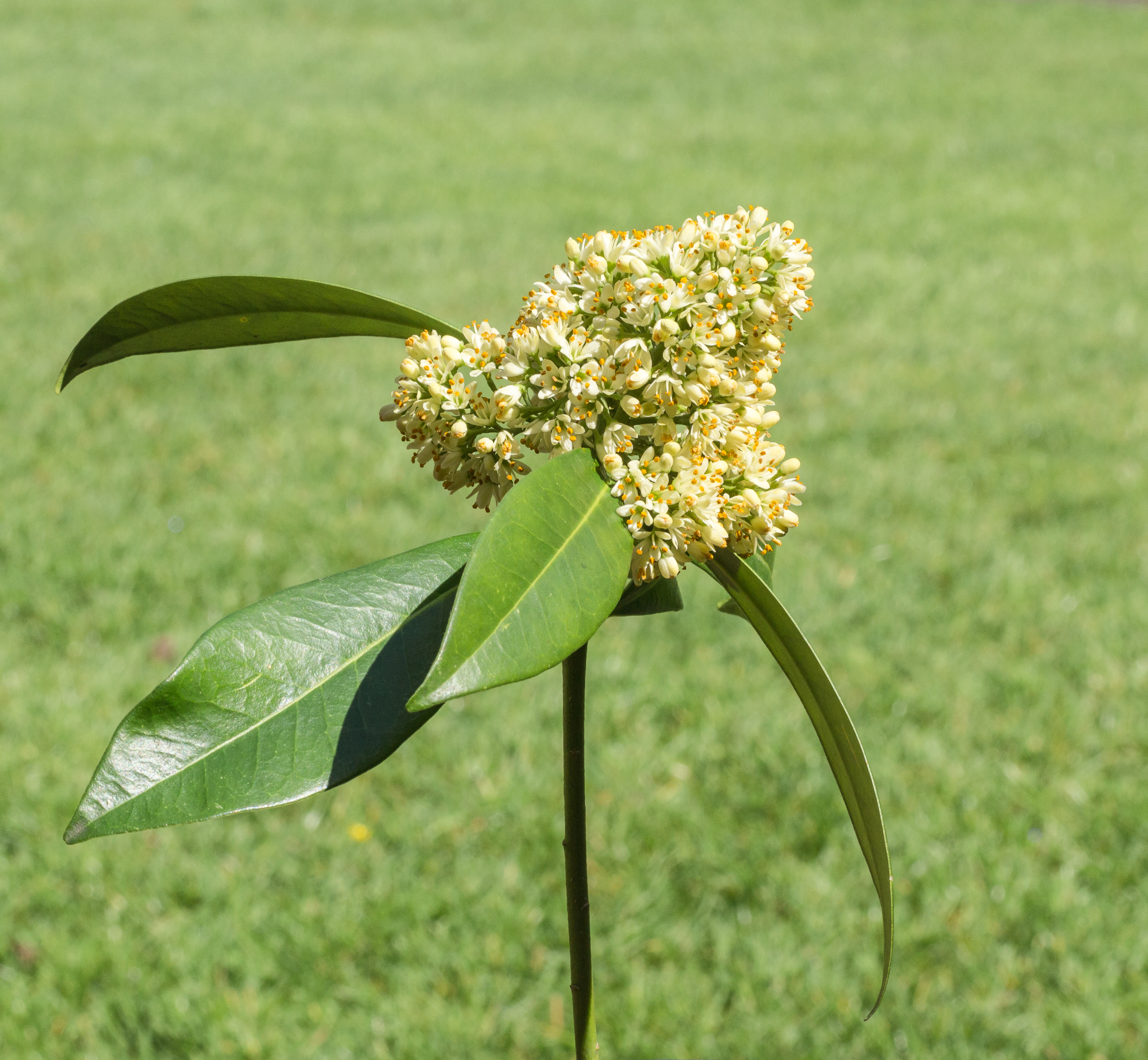
Skimmia japonica Inflorescence.

Skimmia is a genus of four species of evergreen dioecious shrubs and small trees in the rue family Rutaceae, all native to warm temperate regions of Asia. The leaves are clustered at the ends of the shoots, simple, lanceolate, 6–21 cm long and 2–5 cm broad, with a smooth margin. The flowers are in dense panicle clusters, each flower small, 6–15 mm diameter, with 4–7 petals. The fruit is red to black, 6–12 mm diameter, a fleshy drupe containing a single seed. All parts of the plant have a pungent aroma when crushed. The botanical name Skimmia is a Latinization of shikimi (シキミ, 樒), which is the Japanese name for Illicium religiosum as well as an element in miyama shikimi (ミヤマシキミ, 深山樒), the Japanese name for Skimmia japonica.

Species and subspecies

- Skimmia anquetilia N.P.Taylor & Airy Shaw. Western Himalaya to Afghanistan. Shrub to 2 m.
- Skimmia arborescens T.Anderson ex Gamble. Eastern Himalaya to southeast Asia. Shrub or small tree to 15 m.
- Skimmia japonica Thunb. Japan, China. Shrub to 7 m.
  - Skimmia japonica subsp. distincte-venulosa (Hayata) T.C.Ho
  - Skimmia japonica var. lutchuensis (Nakai) T.Yamaz.
  - Skimmia japonica subsp. reevesiana (Fortune) N.P.Taylor & Airy Shaw
- Skimmia laureola (DC.) Decne. Nepal to Vietnam and China. Shrub or small tree to 13 m.
  - Skimmia laureola subsp. lancasteri N.P.Taylor
  - Skimmia laureola subsp. multinervia (C.C.Huang) N.P.Taylor & Airy Shaw

Skimmias are fed on by aphids, Horse Chestnut Scale, Garden Leafhopper, and Southern Red Mite.
