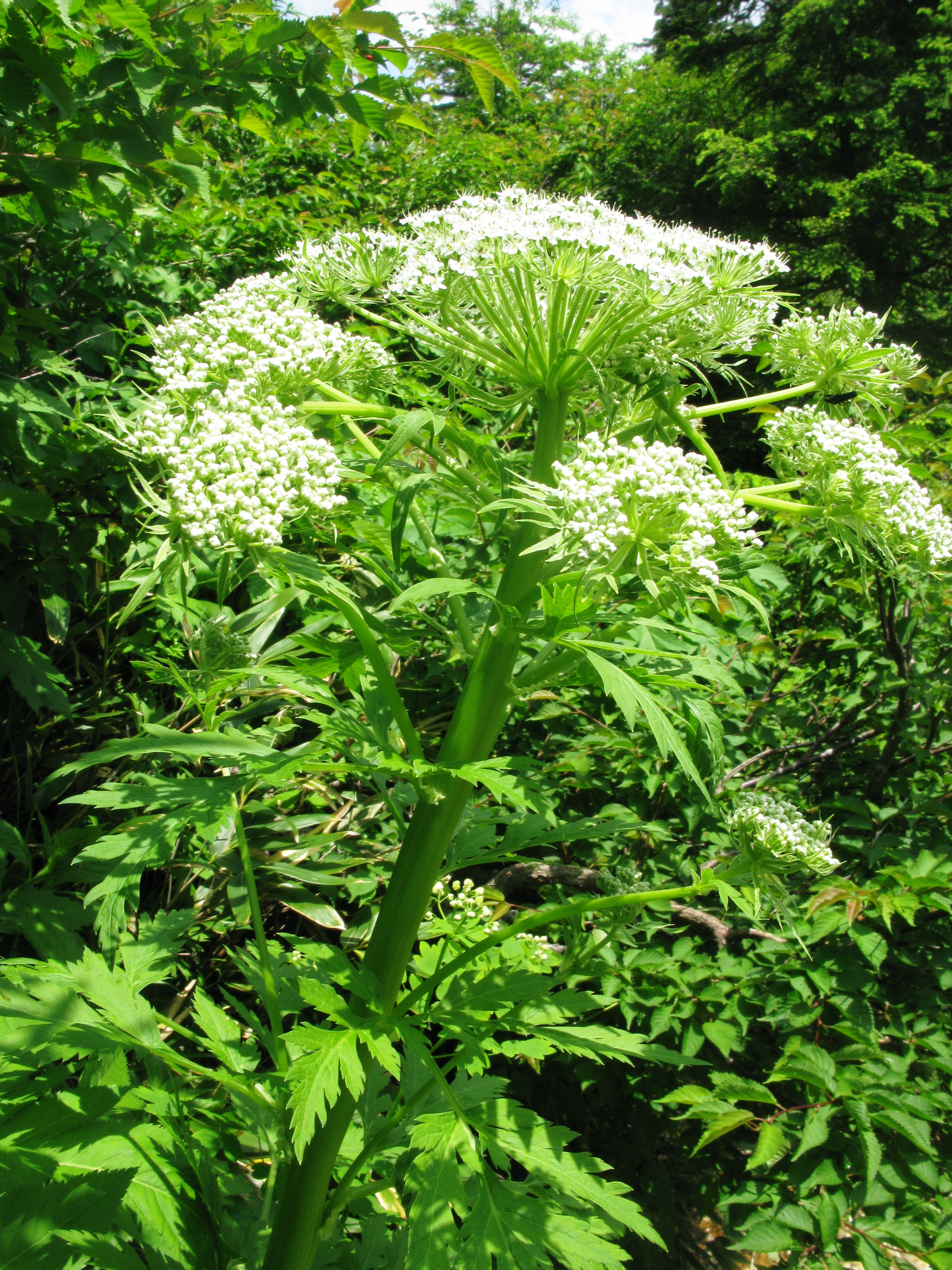
- Pleurospermum uralense

Scientific classification
- Kingdom: Plantae
- Clade: Tracheophytes
- Clade: Angiosperms
- Clade: Eudicots
- Clade: Asterids
- Order: Apiales
- Family: Apiaceae
- Subfamily: Apioideae
- Tribe: Pleurospermeae
- Genus: Pleurospermum; Hoffm.

= Pleurospermum =

Genus of flowering plants

Pleurospermum is a genus of flowering plants in the family Apiaceae.

Its native range is from Europe to Korea and the Himalayas.

== Species ==
The following species are recognised in the genus Pleurospermum:

- Pleurospermum albimarginatum H.Wolff
- Pleurospermum aromaticum W.W.Sm.
- Pleurospermum austriacum (L.) Hoffm.
- Pleurospermum lecomtianum H.Wolff
- Pleurospermum microphyllum H.Wolff
- Pleurospermum microsciadium H.Wolff
- Pleurospermum rivulorum (Diels) M.Hiroe
- Pleurospermum simplex (Rupr.) B.Fedtsch.
- Pleurospermum souliei H.Wolff
- Pleurospermum tripartitum F.T.Pu, R.Li & H.Li
- Pleurospermum uralense Hoffm.
