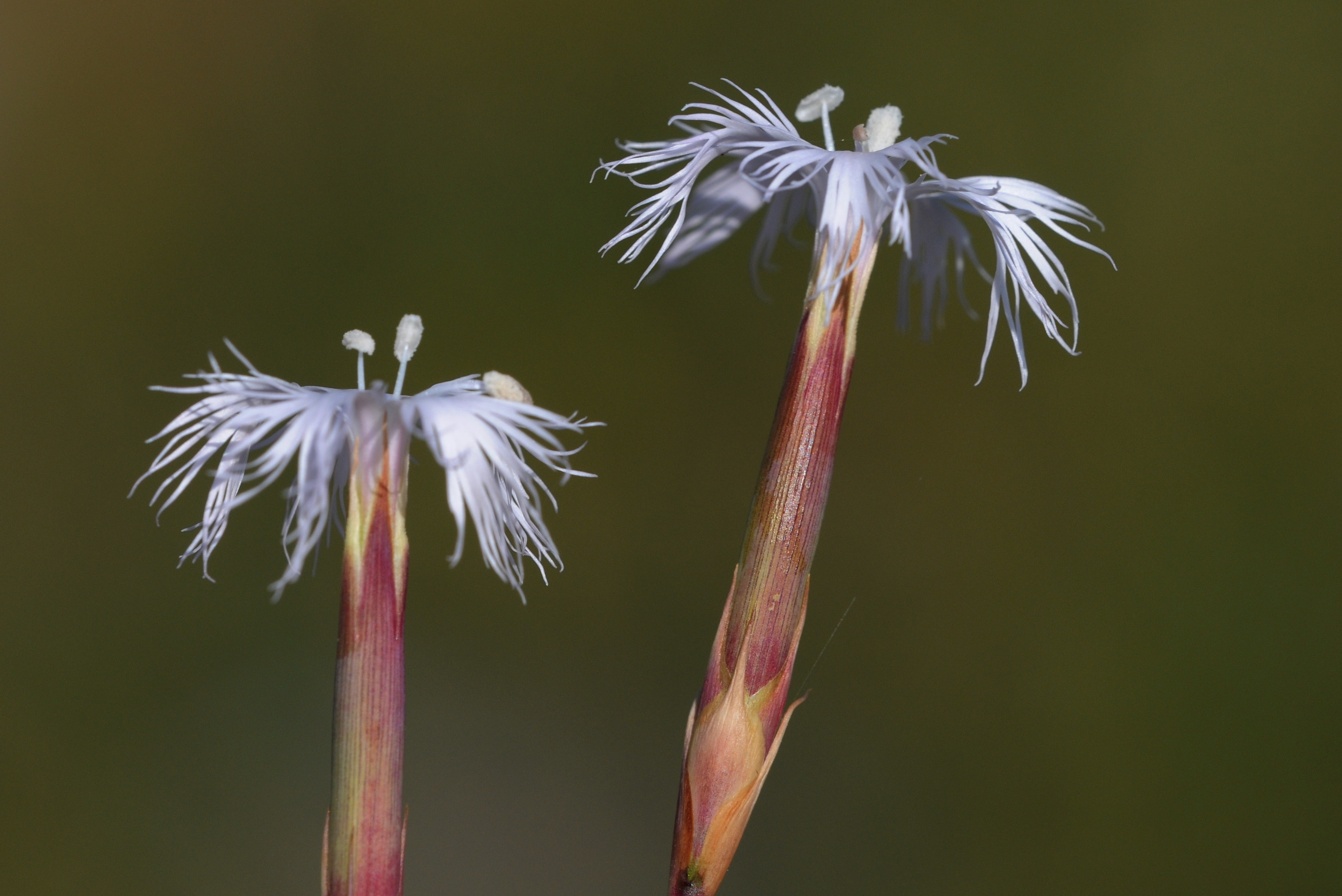

Scientific classification
- Kingdom: Plantae
- Clade: Tracheophytes
- Clade: Angiosperms
- Clade: Eudicots
- Order: Caryophyllales
- Family: Caryophyllaceae
- Genus: Dianthus
- Species: D. crinitus

Binomial name
- Dianthus crinitus Sm.

Synonyms
- Dianthus amoenus Pomel; Dianthus crinitus var. argaeus Aytaç & H.Duman; Dianthus fimbriatus Hohen.; Dianthus ibericus Steven ex Ledeb.

= Dianthus crinitus =

Species of flowering plant

Dianthus crinitus is a species of Dianthus in the carnation family found in northwestern Africa, the eastern Aegean Islands, Anatolia, the Transcaucasus and the North Caucasus, Lebanon, Syria, Iran, the Gulf States, and Oman. Common names may be associated more with some subspecies than others, and include hairy carnation and long‑haired pink. It grows on serpentine soils.

== Subspecies ==
A number of subspecies have been described:

- Dianthus crinitus subsp. baldzhuanicus (Lincz.) Rech.f.
- Dianthus crinitus subsp. kermanensis Rech.f.
- Dianthus crinitus subsp. nuristanicus (Gilli) Rech.f.
- Dianthus crinitus subsp. soongoricus (Schischk.) Kozhevn.
- Dianthus crinitus subsp. tetralepis (Nevski) Rech.f.
- Dianthus crinitus subsp. turcomanicus (Schischk.) Rech.f.
