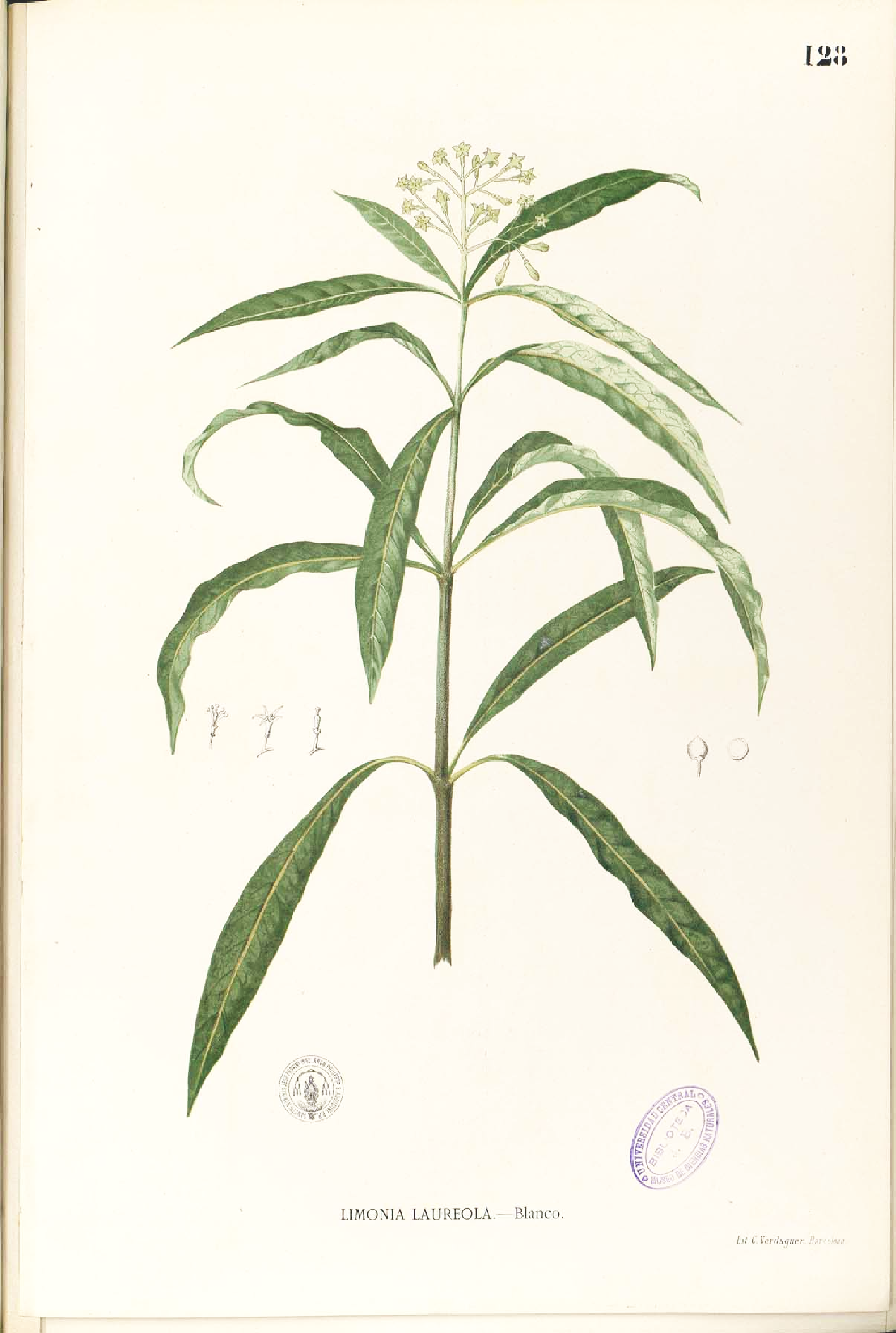

Scientific classification
- Kingdom: Plantae
- Clade: Tracheophytes
- Clade: Angiosperms
- Clade: Eudicots
- Clade: Rosids
- Order: Sapindales
- Family: Rutaceae
- Genus: Skimmia
- Species: S. laureola

Binomial name
- Skimmia laureola Franch.

= Skimmia laureola =

Species of shrub

Skimmia laureola is a species of shrub grown as an ornamental plant. The leaves are edible when cooked. The leaves give an aromatic smell when crushed. It produces white flowers that develop into small round red berries. The berries are eaten by birds, which disperse the seeds through their droppings. Its distribution ranges from northern China to the Northern Himalayas.

S. laureola is also used in bonsai.
