= John Buchanan =

John Buchanan may refer to:

== Business ==
- John Buchanan (oil executive) (1943–2015), New Zealand-born scientist and director
- John C. Buchanan (businessman) (fl. 1846–1848), businessman in San Francisco
- John Murdoch Buchanan (1897–1975), businessman and Chancellor of the University of British Columbia

== Politics and law ==
- John Buchanan (Canadian politician) (1931–2019), premier of Nova Scotia, 1978–1990.
- John Buchanan (American politician), American journalist and U.S. presidential candidate, 2004
- John Buchanan (Maryland judge) (1772–1844), chief judge of the Maryland Court of Appeals
- John Buchanan (MP) (1761–1839), Scottish politician, MP for Dunbartonshire 1821–26
- John Buchanan (New Zealand politician) (1819–1892), New Zealand politician
- John A. Buchanan (1843–1921), US House of Representatives member from Virginia
- John Alexander Buchanan (1887–1976), Canadian senator
- John Andrew Buchanan (1863–1935), judge and politician in Astoria in the U.S. state of Oregon
- John C. Buchanan (Texas politician), Texas state senator, 1879–1885, see Eighteenth Texas Legislature
- John C. Buchanan (Virginia politician) (1911–1991), Virginia state senator, 1972–1991
- John H. Buchanan Jr. (1928–2018), US House of Representatives member from Alabama
- John P. Buchanan (1847–1930), governor of Tennessee
- John Preston Buchanan (1888–1937), American politician in the Virginia Senate
- J. W. Buchanan (1871–1941), Arizona politician, state senator, state house of representatives

== Religion ==
- John Buchanan (pastor) (1938–2025), pastor of the Fourth Presbyterian Church of Chicago
- John Buchanan (bishop) (1933–2020), American bishop of the Episcopal Church

== Sciences and medicine ==
- John Buchanan (biologist) (1917–2007), professor of biochemistry at the Massachusetts Institute of Technology
- John Buchanan (botanist) (1819–1898), New Zealand botanist and scientific artist
- John Young Buchanan (1844–1925), Scottish chemist, oceanographer and Arctic explorer

== Sports ==
- John Buchanan (English cricketer) (1887–1969), English cricketer and decorated WWI officer
- John Buchanan (Australian cricketer) (born 1953), Australian cricketer and coach
- John Buchanan (Cambuslang footballer) (fl. 1889), Scottish footballer
- John Buchanan (footballer, born 1899) (1899–1947), Scottish footballer (St Mirren, Rangers, Morton)
- John Buchanan (footballer, born 1928) (1928–2000), Scottish footballer (Clyde)
- John Buchanan (footballer, born 1935) (1935–2009), Scottish footballer (Hibernian)
- John Buchanan (footballer, born 1951), Scottish footballer (Cardiff City, Northampton Town)
- John Buchanan (sailor) (1884–1943), British Olympic gold medalist in 1908
- John Buchanan (rugby union, born 1863) (1863–1933), Irish rugby union player
- Sir John Buchanan (rugby union, born 1896) (1896–1976), Scottish rugby union player and medical advisor
- John Buchanan (soccer), former Canadian soccer coach, in the Canadian Soccer Hall of Fame

== Other fields ==
- John Buchanan (frontiersman) (1759–1832), American settler and founder of Buchanan's Station
- John Buchanan (inventor), Australian inventor of the atmospheric diving suit
- John Buchanan (judoka) (born 1975), British judoka
- John Buchanan (horticulturalist) (1855–1896), Scottish agriculturalist and early colonial settler in Nyasaland
- John Buchanan (Virginia colonist) (died 1769) Virginia landowner, magistrate and soldier
- John Lee Buchanan (1831–1922), second president of Virginia Tech (then Virginia Agricultural and Mechanical College)
- John Lanne Buchanan (fl. 1780–1816), Scottish author

== See also ==
- James Buchanan (1791–1868), US president commonly misreferenced as "John"
