= Alexander Cunningham (disambiguation) =

Alexander Cunningham (1814–1893) was a British archaeologist and the father of the Archaeological Survey of India.

Alexander Cunningham is also the name of:

- Alexander Cunningham, 1st Earl of Glencairn (1426–1488), Scottish nobleman
- Alexander Cunningham, 5th Earl of Glencairn (died 1574), Scottish nobleman and covenanter
- Alexander Cunningham (jurist) (1655–1730), academic and chess player, often confused with the historian
- Alexander Cunningham (historian) (1655–1737), Scottish diplomat
- Alexander Cunningham (rower) (born 1936), Australian Olympic rower
- Alex Cunningham (born 1955), UK MP
- W. A. Cunningham (1886–1958), American football coach
- Alexander Cunningham (priest) (died 1660), English Anglican priest in Ireland
- Alexander Cunningham (lawyer), one of Robert Burns's closest friends
