= William Thomson (writer) =

Scottish minister and historian

William Thomson (1746–1817) was a Scottish minister, historian and miscellaneous writer. He often wrote under the pseudonym of Captain Thomas Newte and this fictitious character had his own history and received independent recognition.

== Life ==
Born in the parish of Forteviot, Perthshire, he was son of Matthew Thomson, builder, carpenter, and farmer, by his wife, who was the daughter of the schoolmaster of Avintully, near Dunkeld, with surname Miller. Educated at the parish school, Perth grammar school, and St. Andrews University, he became librarian at Dupplin Castle, Perthshire, to Thomas Hay, 9th Earl of Kinnoull. The Earl encouraged him to study for the Church of Scotland, and promised him a parish in his patronage. Completing his theological studies at St. Andrews and Edinburgh, Thomson was ordained on 20 March 1776 assistant to James Porteous, the minister of Monivaird, Perthshire; but his habits and tastes clashed with the post. After complaints by parishioners, he resigned on 1 October 1778, and went to London as a man of letters.

At first unsuccessful, Thomson depended on an income from the Earl of Kinnoull. On 31 October 1783 he received an honorary degree of LL.D. from Glasgow University, and shortly found plenty of work. In 1790 he supported John Leslie by giving him work. Shortly afterwards he joined the circle of Joseph Johnson.

Thomson died at his house at Kensington Gravel Pits, on 16 February 1817.

== Captain Thomas Newte ==
Newte was fictionally born in Devonshire in 1752, therefore being slightly younger than the true Thomson. He claimed to be a landowner in Devonshire and to own several ships run by the East India Company. In 1793 "Newte" was elected a Fellow of the Royal Society of Edinburgh during a visit to that city. His proposers were Dugald Stewart, Sir James Hall, and John Playfair.

The notable book published (to much acclaim) by Newte was Prospects and Observations on a Tour of England and Scotland published in 1791.

== Works ==
Thomson made a reputation with his continuation of Robert Watson's History of Philip III of Spain, 1783, for which he wrote the fifth and sixth books. During the rest of his life, he wrote pamphlets, memoirs, biographies, voyages, travels, and treatises. He tried novels and dramas, collaborated with others, and used pseudonyms.

Thomson's main works include:

- Travels in Europe, Asia, and Africa, 1782.
- The Man in the Moon, a satirical novel in the style of Jonathan Swift, 1783.
- History of Great Britain from the Revolution of 1688 to the Accession of George I, 2 vols. 1787, from the Latin manuscript of Alexander Cunningham. This translation was carried out for Thomas Hollingbery. Thomson confused the issue of the authorship in his introduction: he argued, wrongly and in a way that could be refuted from the extant wills, that the author was the same person as Alexander Cunningham of Block the critic (1655?–1730). He had supporters including Samuel Parr for his theory, which did not last into the 19th century.
- Memoirs of the War in Asia from 1780 to 1784, 2 vols. 1788.
- Appeal to the People on behalf of Warren Hastings, 1788.
- Mammuth, or Human Nature displayed on a grand scale, in a Tour with the Tinkers into the Central Parts of Africa, 1789.
- A Tour in England and Scotland by an English Gentleman, 1789, enlarged into Prospects and Observations on a Tour in England and Scotland, by Thomas Newte, Esq., 1791. Newte's family owned the estate of Duvale in the parish of Bampton, Devon and resided there or at nearby Tiverton
- Memoirs of Sergeant Donald Macleod, 1791.
- Travels into Denmark, Norway, and Sweden, by Andrew Swinton, 1792.
- Introduction to the Trial of Mr. Hastings, 1796.
- Memoirs relative to Military Tactics, 1805.
- Travels in Scotland by James Hall, illustrated, 1807.

Thomson also:

- continued Oliver Goldsmith's History of Greece;
- expanded in 1793 John Lanne Buchanan's Travels in the Hebrides;
- translated Travels to the North Cape, from the Italian of Giuseppe Acerbi;
- compiled under the name of Harrison a commentary on the Bible; and
- edited Narrative of an Expedition against the revolted Negroes of Surinam, by John Gabriel Stedman. It is now known that Thomson made significant changes to the manuscript, in producing the first edition. Stedman rejected that first edition of 1795, requiring it to be destroyed, and the 1796 edition was based on both Thomson's work and the original.

A five-act tragedy, Caledonia, or the Clans of Yore, appeared posthumously in 1818. Thomson prepared from 1790 to 1800 the historical part of Dodsley's Annual Register.

From 1794 to December 1796 Thomson owned The English Review, and largely wrote its content. When he gave up the ownership it was incorporated into the Analytical Review. He also wrote for the European Magazine, the Political Herald, The Oracle, and the Whitehall Evening Post. In politics, he defended the French Revolution in 1792 in an open letter to Samuel Parr; and as the columnist "Ignotus" in The Oracle he supported Charles James Fox.

== Family ==
Thomson was twice married, firstly to Diana Miltone, who was Scottish. His second wife was a novelist, who wrote The Labyrinth of Life and other works. There were children by both marriages.

== Notes ==
Attribution

This article incorporates text from a publication now in the public domain: Lee, Sidney, ed. (1898). "Thomson, William (1746-1817)". Dictionary of National Biography. Vol. 56. London: Smith, Elder & Co.
