= Edward Leigh (cricketer, born 1913) =

English cricketer

Personal information
- Full name: Edward Buchanan Leigh
- Born: 19 June 1913; Vacoas, British Mauritius
- Died: 15 August 1994 (aged 81); Petersfield, Hampshire, England
- Batting: Right-handed
- Bowling: Right-arm off break
- Relatives: John Buchanan (uncle)

Domestic team information
- Years: Team
- 1936/37–1937/38: Bihar
- 1934: Buckinghamshire

Career statistics
| Competition | First-class |
|---|---|
| Matches | 2 |
| Runs scored | 29 |
| Batting average | 7.25 |
| 100s/50s | –/– |
| Top score | 13 |
| Balls bowled | 6 |
| Wickets | – |
| Bowling average | – |
| 5 wickets in innings | – |
| 10 wickets in match | – |
| Best bowling | – |
| Catches/stumpings | 3/– |
- Source: ESPNcricinfo, 27 June 2011

Edward Buchanan Leigh (19 June 1913 – 15 August 1994) was an English cricketer. Leigh was a right-handed batsman who bowled right-arm off break. He was born at Vacoas, British Mauritius.

Leigh played Minor Counties Championship cricket for Buckinghamshire, making three appearances against Hertfordshire, Bedfordshire and Oxfordshire. Later serving in the Raj, Leigh made two first-class appearances for Bihar. The first came in 1936 against Bengal, with Leigh being dismissed in Bihars' first-innings for 11 runs by Probodh Dutt. In their second-innings, he scored 13 runs before being dismissed by the same bowler. His second first-class appearance came the following year against the same opposition. In this second match, Leigh was dismissed for a single run in Bihars' first-innings by Jitendra Banerjee, while in their second-innings he was dismissed for 4 runs by Tom Longfield.

He died at Petersfield, Hampshire on 15 August 1994.
