= Robert Watson (historian) =

Scottish minister and academic (1730–1781)

Robert Watson (c.1730–1781) was a Scottish minister and academic, known as a historian.

== Life ==
The son of an apothecary and brewer in St Andrews, Watson was born there about 1730. After studying at St Andrews, Glasgow, and Edinburgh, he was licensed as a preacher; but having failed to obtain a presentation to one of the churches in St. Andrews, he was shortly afterwards appointed professor of logic in St. Salvator's College. There he was promoted to be principal in 1777. The same year he was also presented by George III to the church and parish of St. Leonard.

Watson died on 31 March 1781.

== Works ==
In 1777 Watson published History of Philip II of Spain (London, 2 vols.) Praised by Horace Walpole, it had publishing success: translated into French, German, and Dutch, it also reached a seventh edition by 1812. (The French translator was Honoré Gabriel Riqueti, comte de Mirabeau.) At the time of his death he was working on a History of the Reign of Philip III: it was completed by William Thomson, and published in 1783 (London; revised editions 1808 and 1839; French translation 1809).

John Stuart Mill, discussing his childhood reading, wrote, " ...but my greatest delight, then and for long afterwards, was Watson's Philip the Second and Third."

== Family ==
Watson married, on 29 June 1757, Margaret Shaw, by whom he left five daughters.

== Notes ==
Attribution

This article incorporates text from a publication now in the public domain: Lee, Sidney, ed. (1899). "Watson, Robert (1730?-1781)". Dictionary of National Biography. Vol. 60. London: Smith, Elder & Co.
