= Sigerdis =

Location of present-day Sindh in the map of Pakistan

Sigerdis is a name given by the ancient Greeks to a part of the northwestern South Asia. It seems to correspond to the Sindhu, the delta of the Indus river, today's area of Sindh in southern Pakistan.

Referring to the conquests of the Indo-Greeks in the 2nd century BCE, Strabo writes that:

The Greeks... took possession, not only of Patalena, but also, on the rest of the coast, of what is called the kingdom of Saraostus and Sigerdis. In short, Apollodorus says that Bactriana is the ornament of Ariana as a whole; and, more than that, they extended their empire even as far as the Seres and the Phryni. (Strabo 11.11.1)

== See also ==
- Regio Patalis
- Patan

== Notes ==
1. Strabo 11.11.1 Full text
