= John Buchanan (rugby union, born 1863) =

Rugby union player from Northern Ireland

- Full name: John Blacker Whitla Buchanan
- Born: 26 April 1863 Edenfel, County Tyrone, Ireland
- Died: 7 November 1933 (aged 70) Belfast, Northern Ireland

Rugby union career
- Position: Forward
International career
Years	Team	Apps	(Points)
1882–84	Ireland	3	(0)

John Blacker Whitla Buchanan (26 April 1863 – 7 November 1933) was an Irish international rugby union player.

Buchanan came from a well known family in County Tyrone. His father was a Colonel and he had an uncle who served as the British Consul in New York. He attended Sherborne School and Trinity College Dublin, where he played rugby. Capped three times, Buchanan made his debut for Ireland against Scotland at Glasgow in 1882.

After receiving his commission in 1886, Buchanan had several years of Army service in India and was involved in the Second Boer War. He retired in 1911 and ran a convalescent home in Holywood during World War I.

Buchanan served as a deputy lieutenant for County Tyrone.

== See also ==
- List of Ireland national rugby union players
