= Patalene =

Region in antiquity corresponding to Sindh

Location of Patalene (modern Sindh) in Pakistan.

Patalene (Ancient Greek: Παταληνή) or Pattalene (Ancient Greek: Πατταληνή) was an ancient area of the Indian subcontinent, now in modern Pakistan, that corresponds to the area of Sind.

The Indo-Greeks are mentioned in ancient sources as having occupied the areas of the Patalene (Sindh) and Gujarat, including the strategic harbour of Barygaza (Bharuch), conquests also attested by coins dating from the Indo-Greek ruler Apollodotus I and by several ancient writers (Strabo 11; Periplus of the Erythraean Sea, Chap. 41/47):

The Greeks... took possession, not only of Patalene, but also, on the rest of the coast, of what is called the kingdom of Saraostus and Sigerdis.

— Strabo 11.11.1

Ptolemy mentioned Patalena in his Geographia:

Moreover the region which is next to the western part of India, is called Indoscythia. A part of this region around the (Indus) river mouth is Patalena, above which is Abiria. That which is about the mouth of the Indus and the Canthicolpus bay is called Syrastrena. (...) In the island formed by this river are the cities Pantala, Barbaria. (...) The Larica region of Indoscythia is located eastward from the swamp near the sea, in which on the west of the Namadus river is the interior city of Barygaza emporium. On the east side of the river (...) Ozena-Regia Tiastani (...) Minnagara".

— Ptolemy Geographia, Book Seven, Chapter I

== See also ==
- Regio Patalis
