= Alexander Cunningham (historian) =

Scottish diplomat and historian

Alexander Cunningham (1655–1737) was a Scottish diplomat and historian.

== Life ==
The current scholarly view is that little can be said certainly about his early life: he was related to Henry Cunningham who was Governor of Jamaica, and so linked to the Glencairn family. He was travelling tutor to James Carmichael, late the 2nd Earl of Hyndford from 1692 to 1695.

Cunningham visited Rome in 1700, after giving up a position as tutor to Lord Lorne. The following year he was sent as agent to Paris, nominally on a mission to prepare a trade convention or commercial treaty, between France and Scotland, but in reality as a spy. He gave William III of England an account of French military preparations. After William's death, he continued to act on behalf of the Whig party. He visited Hanover with Joseph Addison in 1703, where he was received by the Electress Sophia and her son George I Louis.

Cunningham was frequently consulted by the framers of the union between England and Scotland. He tried to reconcile Harley and Somers, and was an acquaintance of Sir Isaac Newton. After the Whigs lost power in 1710, he returned to tutoring, in 1711 accompanying Lord Lonsdale to Italy.

The accession of George I brought Cunningham in 1715 the appointment as British envoy to Venice, where he remained till 1720, when he retired on a pension. He then returned to London. He died in 1737, and was buried in the church of St. Martin-in-the-Fields on 15 May 1737. By his will, he left a fortune of £12,000.

== Works ==
A manuscript history in Latin by Cunningham came into the possession of Thomas Hollingbery, archdeacon of Chichester, a relative of his; who gave it to William Thomson. Thomson published an elaborate translation of it, in two volumes, in 1787 as The History of Great Britain from the Revolution in 1688 to the accession of George I. The history has been taken as authoritative for many of the events it relates, but is a partisan Whig account.

Thomson argued, wrongly given the extant wills, that the author was the same person as Alexander Cunningham the critic (1655?–1730). He had some notable supporters for his theory, which did not last into the 19th century.

== Notes ==
Attribution

This article incorporates text from a publication now in the public domain: Stephen, Leslie, ed. (1888). "Cunningham, Alexander (1655?-1730)". Dictionary of National Biography. Vol. 13. London: Smith, Elder & Co.
