= Jane McIntosh =

Scottish archaeologist and author

Jane R. McIntosh is a Scottish archaeologist and author.

McIntosh obtained a PhD from the University of Cambridge on contacts between the Indus Valley Civilisation and Mesopotamia. She then began writing popular books about archaeology. Her first book, The Practical Archaeologist (1986), has been described as a "key reference" and is recommended as an introduction to archaeology for beginners. However, one reviewer of the revised edition (1999) felt that the lack of up-to-date information in some sections meant that it could not be "recommended as a reference source to the serious student of archaeology". Her 2001 book on the Indus Valley Civilisation, A Peaceful Realm, was less well received. Jonathan Mark Kenoyer wrote that "as a story it is quite well written and engaging", but that as an academic reference it is "seriously flawed", with numerous errors, unclear references, and an overall interpretation that "reinforces stereotypes of the Indus that scholars have been trying to erase for the past fifty years".

== Works ==
- 1986. The Practical Archaeologist: How We Know What We Know About the Past. Facts on File.
- 1999. The Practical Archaeologist: How We Know What We Know About the Past. 2nd edition. Thames & Hudson.
- 2000. Archaeology. DK Eyewitness Books.
- 2000. Treasure Seekers: The World's Great Fortunes Lost and Found. Carlton Books.
- 2001. A Peaceful Realm: The Rise and Fall of the Indus Civilization. Westview Press.
- 2003. Civilizations: Ten Thousand Years of Ancient History. BBC Books.
- 2005. Ancient Mesopotamia: New Perspectives. ABC-CLIO.
- 2006. Handbook to Life in Prehistoric Europe. Oxford University Press.
- 2008. The Ancient Indus Valley: New Perspectives. ABC-CLIO.
