= Regio Patalis =

Region in antiquity around the Indus River Delta

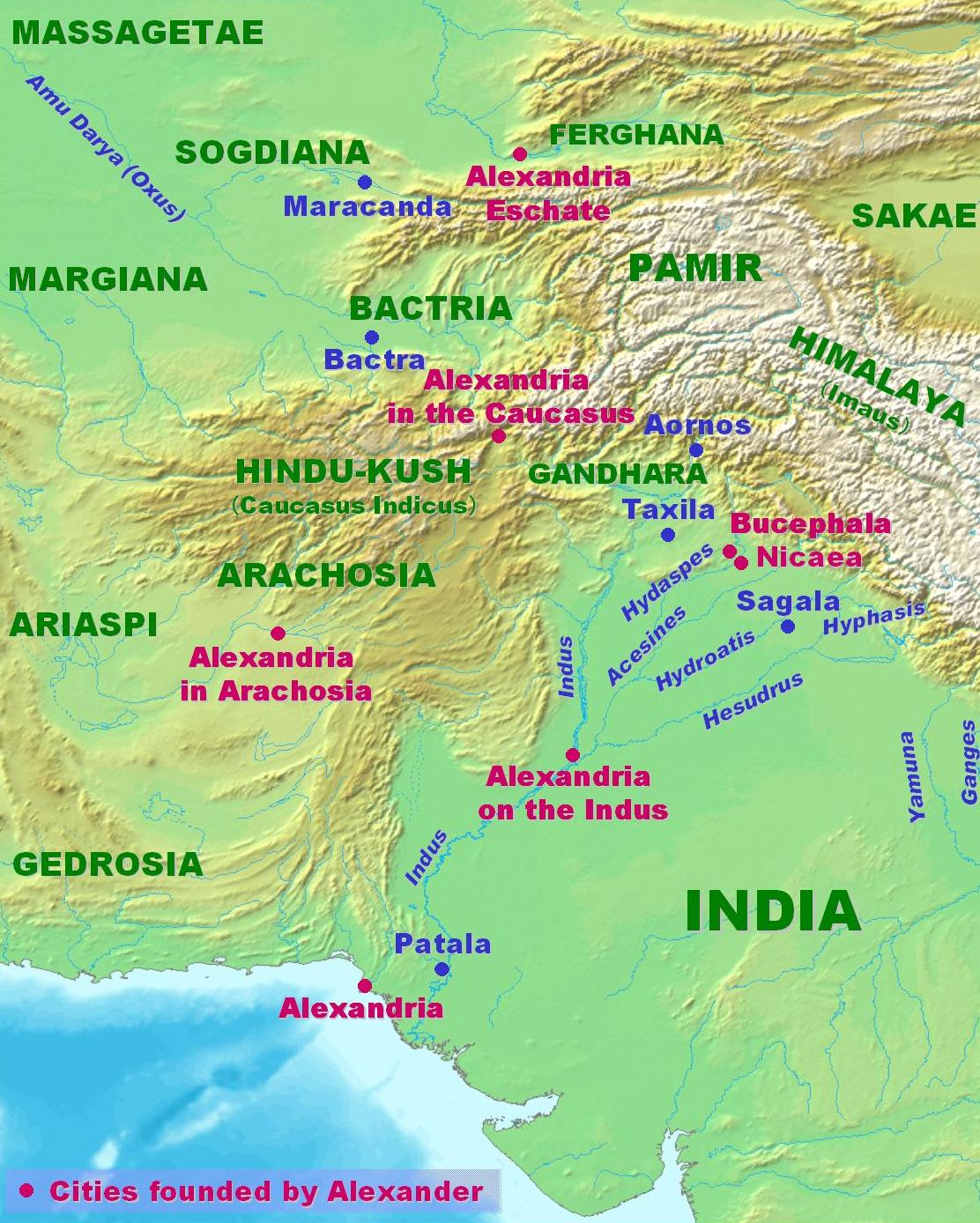
City of Patala below Alexandria on the Indus

Regio Patalis (Latin, 'the region of Patala') is the region around the ancient city of Patala at the mouth of the Indus River in Sindh, Pakistan. The historians of Alexander the Great state that the Indus parted into two branches at the city of Patala before reaching the sea, and the island thus formed was called Patalene, the district of Patala. Alexander constructed a harbour at Patala.

While the Patala was well known to mariners and traders of the Ancient Mediterranean, by the European Middle Ages, mapmakers no longer knew its location. Regio Patalis appeared on late 15th and early 16th century maps and globes in a variety of increasingly erroneous locations, further and further east and south of India. It even appeared on some maps as a promontory of Terra Australis.

== The Regio Patalis in classical literature ==
Pliny the Elder (Gaius Plinius Secundus, 23-79 AD) referring to “the island of Patale, at the mouth of the Indus”, wrote in Historia Naturalis: “Also in India [as well as at Aswan in Egypt] at the well-known port of Patale the sun rises on the right and shadows fall southward”.

The geographer Strabo (c.64 BC–c.24 AD) had said: “The Indus falls into the southern sea by two mouths, encompassing the country of Patalênê, which resembles the Delta in Egypt”. He noted: “All these [nations] were conquered by Alexander, and last of all he reduced Patalênê, which the Indus forms by splitting into two branches… Patalênê contains a considerable city, Patala, which gives its name to the island”.

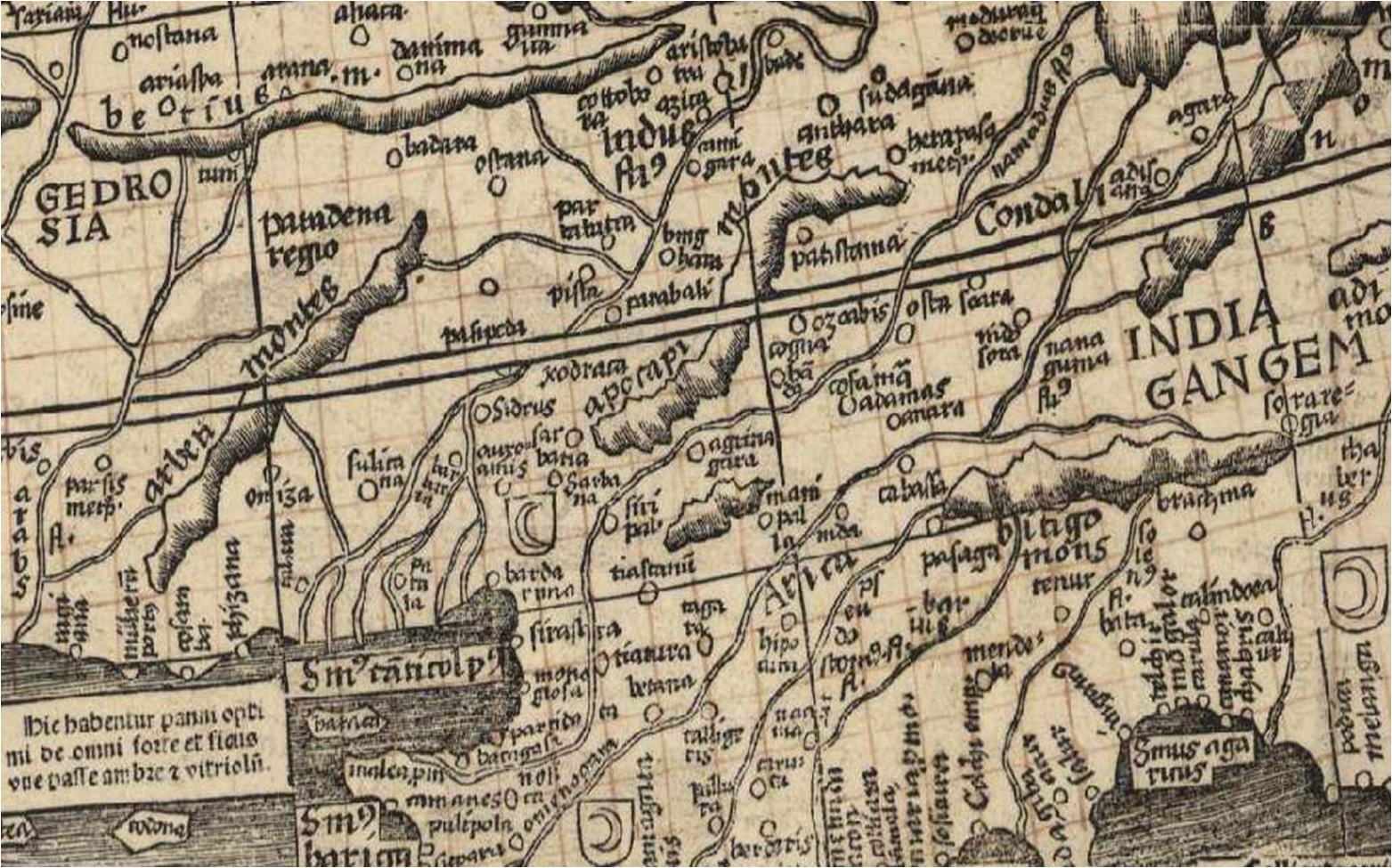
Patala on the Waldseemüller map

The 1507 Martin Waldseemüller map shows Patala in this location.

In the late 2nd century BC, Agatharchides of Cnidus recorded merchants from Patala, or as he called it, Potana, coming to the island of Socotra to trade with Alexandrian merchants. The 2nd century AD author Dionysios Periegetes said in his Orbis Descriptio: “This river [the Indus] has two mouths, and dashes against the island enclosed between them, called in the tongue of the natives, Patalênê”. Or, as Priscian put it in his popular rendition of Periegetes: “the River Indus... Patalene is girt by its divided waters.”

Some scholars identify Patala with Thatta, a one-time capital of Sindh. But the identity of Patala is much debated among scholars. However, as 'Regio' is Latin for 'region', one might expect that 'Patalis' may also be of Latin origin. This indeed appears to be the case, as in ancient Latin 'patalis' meant 'broad-horned', usually used in conjunction with 'bos', meaning an ox or a bull or all sorts of oxen [Thomas Morell, An Abridgement of Ainsworth's Dictionary, English and Latin, Camden Town, London: A. Wilson, 1817], rendering 'region of the broad-horns (bulls)'.

Siltation has caused the Indus to change its course many times since the days of Alexander the Great, and the site of ancient Patala has been subject to much conjecture. Ahmad Hasan Dani, director of the Taxila Institute of Asian Civilisations, Islamabad, concluded: “There has been a vain attempt to identify the city of Patala. If ‘Patala’ is not taken as a proper name but only refers to a city, it can be corrected to ‘Pattana’, that is, [Sanskrit for] a city or port city par excellence, a term applied in a later period to Thatta [onetime capital of Sindh], which is ideally situated in the way the Greek historians describe”. However, the Dravidian Etymological Dictionary clearly indicates that this word is derived from South and South Central Dravidian languages, and the variety of Sanskrit used for official purposes in Sindh would not have used the term to describe a city.

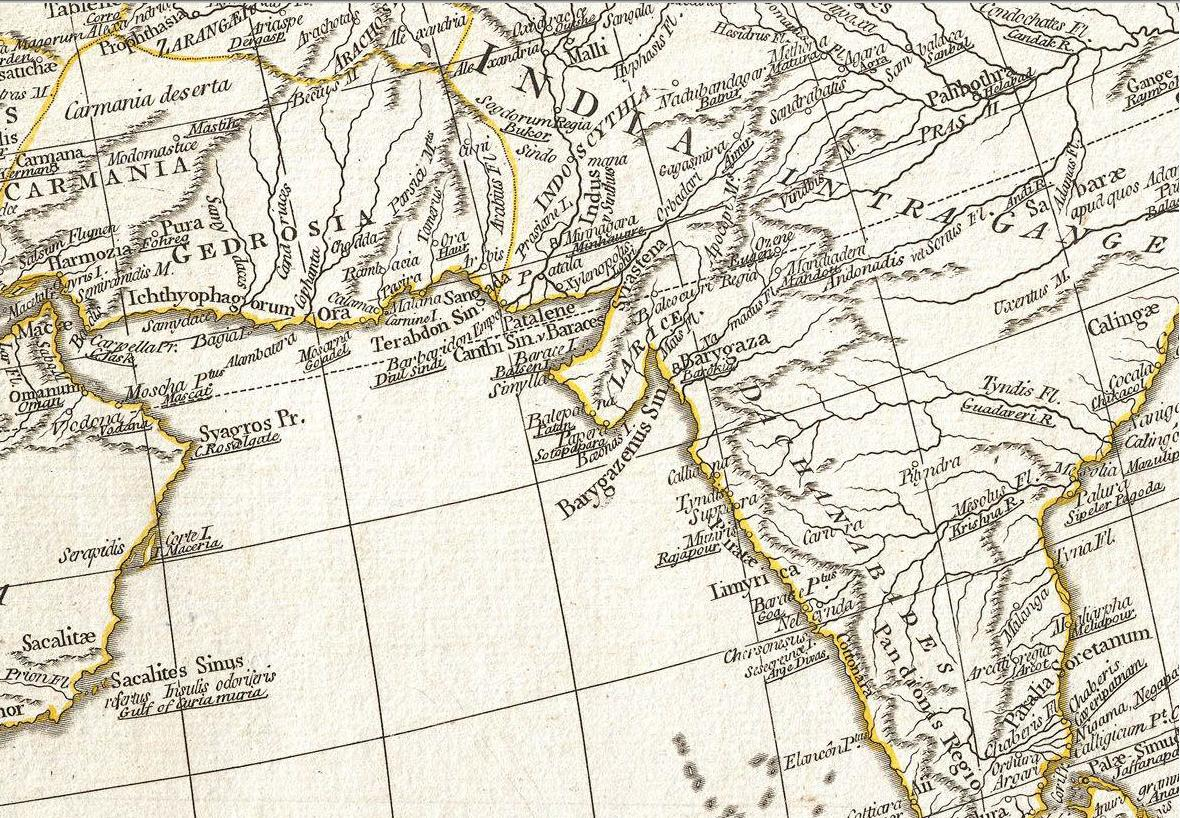
Patala and Patalene on the map by Jean Baptiste Bourguignon d'Anville, Orbis Veteribus Notus [The World Known to the Ancients], in Complete Body of Ancient Geography, Laurie and Whittle, London, 1795.

The eighteenth century French geographer, Jean-Baptiste Bourguignon d'Anville, also identified Thatta with Patala:“Tatta is not only a town, but also a province of India, according to modern travellers; this town has taken the place of the ancient Patala or Pattala, which formerly gave name to the country included between the mouths of the Indus.” This opinion was shared by Alexander Burnes, who voyaged up the Indus on a diplomatic mission in 1831–32, and wrote:"The antiquity of Tatta is unquestioned. The Pattala of the Greeks has been sought for in this position, and, I believe, with good reason; for the Indus here divides into two great branches; and these are the words of the historian:- ‘Near Pattala, the river Indus divides itself into two vast branches’ (Arrian, lib.vi). Both Robertson and Vincent appear to have entertained the opinion of its identity with Tatta".

The reason for Pliny mentioning Patala, or as he called it, Patale, was to indicate that it, like the other places mentioned in the same chapter of his Natural History, particularly Syene (Aswan, in Egypt), was situated on or below the Tropic of Cancer and so shadows there were cast southward in midsummer, thus demonstrating the rotundity of the Earth. Pliny, writing in Latin, used the form, Patale: in accordance with convention, he treats Patala, being for him a Greek-derived noun, as a third declension Latin noun with the genitive form Patalis, as though its nominative case was Patale: hence, Regio Patalis not Regio Patalae.

Syene is connected with the measurement of Earth's circumference by Eratosthenes of Cyrene in c.240 BC, although the method traditionally considered a used by Eratosthenes is actually a simplification of another author, Cleomedes, who proposed his readers to imagine to observe the angle of a shadow cast at Alexandria on the day of the summer solstice — eighty-three degrees — and deducting that from the ninety-degree right angle of the sun over Syene on the same day, from that deducing the acute angle — seven degrees — at the apex of the segment of the Earth's circumference represented by the known distance from Syene to Alexandria — 500 stadia — and then multiplying that distance by the value of that angle and dividing it by the 360 degrees of the whole circumference of the Earth: 250,000 stadia (instead of the 252,000 actually measured by Eratosthenes), or 39,690 km, an error of less than one per cent.

== The Regio Patalis in Renaissance cosmography ==
The map of the world by the French mathematician and cosmographer Oronce Fine published in 1531 shows a large promontory attached to the continent of TERRA AVSTRALIS and extending northward almost to the Tropic of Capricorn: this promontory is named REGIO PATALIS (“Region of Patala”).

Fine's TERRA AVSTRALIS with its REGIO PATALIS is apparently drawn from the globe of the German cosmographer Johann Schoener produced in Nuremberg in 1523. On this globe the Antarctic continent, called TERRA AVSTRALIS RECENTER INVENTA SED NONDUM PLENE COGNITA (“Terra Australis, recently discovered but not yet fully known”) also has a large promontory bearing the name REGIO PATALIS.

Schoener developed his globe from the globe made by Martin Behaim in Nuremberg in 1492. On Behaim's globe, India potalis is located south of the Equator on the Hoch India (High India, or India Superior) peninsula, the actual Indochina, on the eastern side of the Sinus Magnus ("Great Gulf", the Gulf of Thailand). An inscription on Behaim's globe explains that Hoch India (India Superior ), was situated so far to the South that the Pole Star was no longer visible: “because this land lies at the antipodes to our land”.

Martin Behaim's source of knowledge of India Patalis was the Ymago Mundi of Pierre d'Ailly, a revised edition of earlier standard cosmographical works which d’Ailly wrote between 1410 and 1419. D’Ailly wrote: “according to Pliny we find there to be habitation under the Tropic of Capricorn and beyond. For the island called the Regio Pathalis has a well-known port where the Sun's shadow falls southward, therefore the inhabitants always have the Sun to their North… I say therefore that the southern side of India extends to the Tropic of Capricorn near the region of Pathalis”.

In discussing the habitability of lands under the Torrid Zone and Tropic of Capricorn, D'Ailly drew on the Opus Majus, written around the year 1267 English monk and scholar Roger Bacon. With regard to the Regio Patalis, Bacon said: “the southern frontier of India reaches the Tropic of Capricorn near the Region of Patale and the neighbouring lands which are washed by a great arm of the sea flowing from the Ocean”. Patala was on or just south of the Tropic of Cancer, not south of the Equator, but somehow Roger Bacon had confused the Tropic of Capricorn with the Tropic of Cancer under which, on the day of the summer solstice, shadows at Patala were cast southward.

D’Ailly's Ymago Mundi served as the standard text book on cosmography during the 15th and early 16th centuries and so made widely current the view that there was a part of India, or of what was later called Indo-China, where the sun's shadow always fell southward at noon: this part was the Region of Patala. This theory found expression on Martin Behaim's globe of 1492, where India potalis is located south of the Equator on the Hoch India peninsula on the eastern side of the Sinus Magnus, the actual Indochina. This concept of the Region of Patala is shown as Patalie regiã in the world map included in La Salade, a textbook of the studies necessary for a prince written by Antoine de La Sale and published in 1444.

Following Magellan’s circumnavigation voyage of 1519-1522, Johann Schoener identified South America with the extended India Superior (Indochina) peninsula, and so depicted it on his 1523 globe. He also split the Region of Patala (Regio Patalis) off from this peninsula and transferred it across the ocean to become a promontory of the Terra Australis. In this he was followed by Oronce Fine, whose mappemonde of 1531 shows the large REGIO PATALIS promontory on the continent of TERRA AVSTRALIS.

The REGIO PATALIS is shown on the globe in an armillary clock made by Jean Naze of Lyon in 1560, in a fashion similar to that on Schoener's globe of 1523 and on Fine's map of 1531. It is also shown on the Nancy Globe, made c.1535.

The world maps of the school of cartographers centred in and around the Norman port of Dieppe (the Dieppe Maps), include the Harleian, so-called after its former owner, Edward Harley, made by an unknown cartographer in the mid-1540s, that made by Pierre Desceliers in 1546, and also Guillaume Le Testu’s Cosmographie Universelle of 1555. On these maps, Fine's REGIO PATALIS has evolved into the great promontory of Jave la Grande (Greater Java) which extends, like the Regio Patalis, northward from the Austral continent. This development may have been influenced by the phrase used by the Italian traveler Ludovico di Varthema in describing Java which, he said, “prope in inmensum patet (extends almost beyond measure)”. Although the word patet (“extends”) has no connection with Patala, the superficial resemblance may have misled them.

Terra Java in the Vallard Atlas of 1547, another product of the Dieppe school, bears the vestigial toponym patallis inscribed on its west coast. “Patal(l)is” is the genitive form of Patala, and therefore simply means “of Patala” without specifying the “what” of Patala—region, land, kingdom, port, or city—indicating that it is no more than a vestige of the original “Regio Patalis”.

The cosmography of the Dieppe mapmakers, particularly as regards the Austral continent, developed from that of Johann Schoener, through the work of Oronce Fine. Albert Anthiaume wrote in 1911: “Whence had the Norman cartographers drawn the idea of this continent [la Terre Australe]? From the bicordiform [two-heart shaped] mappemonde of Oronce Fine (1531), which he in turn had borrowed from Schoener....Most of the Norman cartographers, and particularly Le Testu, knew the works of Oronce Fine”.

In his study of Schöner's globes, Franz von Wieser, found that the derivation of Fine's mappemonde from them was “unmistakeable (unverkennbar)”.

Schoener's idea of the Regio Patalis developed, as explained above, from the earlier globe of Martin Behaim which itself was based on the works of Pierre d’Ailly, Roger Bacon and Pliny the Elder, and not on the accounts of any voyages to the unknown Austral continent, the Terra Australis Incognita.

Jave la Grande on the Dieppe maps, which was derived from the ideas of Johann Schoener, can be seen to be a construct of the cosmographical concepts of the early 16th century and not derived from the discovery of the coasts of Australia made by unknown voyagers of that time. This is seen on Guillaume Le Testu’s 1556 Cosmographie Universel, 4me projection, where the northward extending promontory of the Terre australle, called Regio Patalis by Schöner and Fine, is called Grande Jaue. French geographer Numa Broc has noted that the Dieppe cartographers, including Le Testu, replaced the Regio Patalis of Oronce Fine with a Grande Jave, more or less attached to an enormous austral land mass, and that their insistence on speaking of “la Grande Jave” permitted the erection of the hypothesis of a Portuguese or French “pre-discovery” of Australia between 1520 and 1530.

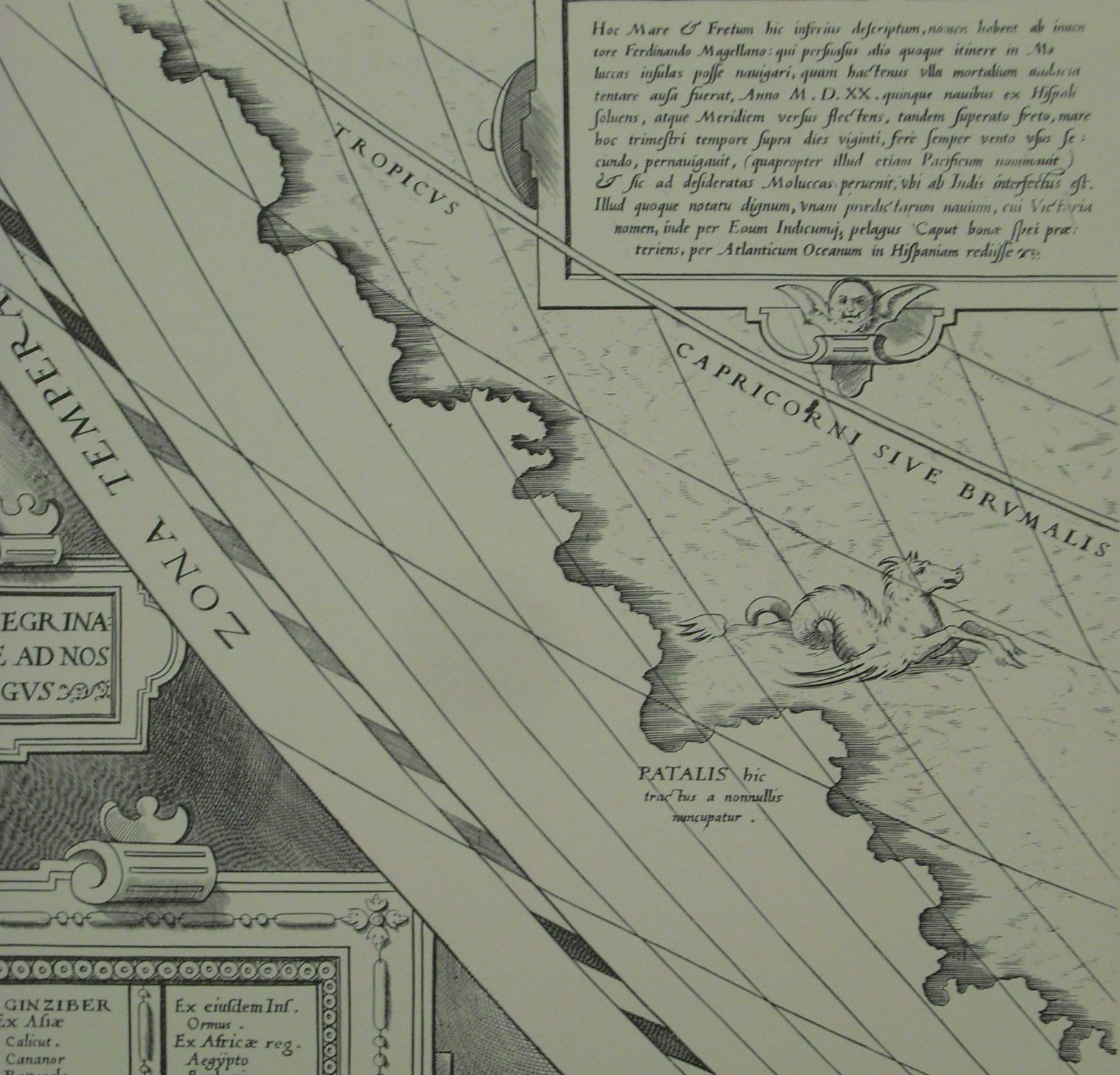
Regio Patalis as part of Terra Australis: Abraham Ortelius, Typus Orbis Terrarum, 1564.

The Flemish cosmographer and map maker Gerard Mercator produced a map of the world in 1538 which, though modelled on that of Fine of 1531, departed from it by showing Fine's southern continent much smaller, unnamed and bearing the inscription, Terra hic esse certum est sed quãtus quibusque limitibus finitas incertum (“It is certain that there is a land here, but its size and the limits of its boundaries are uncertain”). The outline of Fine's Regio Patalis, though shown as a promontory of this smaller Antarctic continent, is likewise unnamed.

In 1564, Mercator's Flemish contemporary, Abraham Ortelius published a world map, Typus Orbis Terrarum, on which he identified the Regio Patalis with Locach as a northward extension of the Terra Australis: ”This tract is called by some Patalis"; and "The Region of Locach seems to be placed here by Marco Polo the Venetian". The great promontory terminated in the north with New Guinea, "recently discovered, so called because its nature and climate do not differ from the African Guinea; apparently this tract was called Terra de Piccinacoli by Andrea Corsali".

From that time on, the outline of the Regio Patalis/Jave la Grande/Locach promontory gradually faded from the maps of the world.

== See also ==
- Sigerdis
- Thatta
- Dieppe Maps
- Jave la Grande
- Theory of Portuguese discovery of Australia

== Bibliography ==
- Eggermont, Pierre Herman Leonard (1975), Alexander's Campaigns in Sind and Baluchistan and the Siege of the Brahmin Town of Harmatelia, Peeters Publishers, ISBN 978-90-6186-037-2
- Dani, Ahmad Hasan (1981), "Sindhu-Sauvira", in Hamida Khuhro (ed.), Sind through the centuries: proceedings of an international seminar held in Karachi in Spring 1975, Oxford University Press, pp. 35–42, ISBN 978-0-19-577250-0
