= John Buchanan (English cricketer) =

South African-born English cricketer

Personal information
- Full name: John Nevile Buchanan
- Born: 30 May 1887; Grahamstown, Cape Colony
- Died: 31 October 1969 (aged 82); St John's Wood, London, England
- Batting: Right-handed
- Bowling: Right-arm medium-fast
- Relatives: Edward Leigh (nephew)

Domestic team information
- Years: Team
- 1925–1927: Buckinghamshire
- 1910: Marylebone Cricket Club
- 1906–1909: Cambridge University

Career statistics
| Competition | First-class |
|---|---|
| Matches | 34 |
| Runs scored | 1,536 |
| Batting average | 26.48 |
| 100s/50s | 4/5 |
| Top score | 118 |
| Balls bowled | 1,889 |
| Wickets | 26 |
| Bowling average | 42.07 |
| 5 wickets in innings | – |
| 10 wickets in match | – |
| Best bowling | 4/56 |
| Catches/stumpings | 45/– |
- Source: Cricinfo, 14 August 2011

John Nevile Buchanan DSO MC (30 May 1887 – 31 October 1969) was a South African born English cricketer. Buchanan was a right-handed batsman who bowled right-arm medium-fast. He was born in Grahamstown, Cape Colony and educated at Charterhouse School in England, where he played for and captained the school cricket team, before undertaking studies at Cambridge University. He later served in World War I, becoming by war's end a highly decorated officer.

== Cricket career ==
Buchanan made his first-class debut for Cambridge University against Yorkshire in 1906. He made 30 further first-class appearances for the university, the last of which came against Oxford University in 1909. In 31 first-class appearances for the university, he scored 1,484 runs at an average of 28.00, making 5 half centuries and 4 centuries, with a top score of 118. This score came against Northamptonshire in 1906. As a bowler, Buchanan took 26 wickets at a bowling average of 41.11, with best figures of 4/56.

Following his studies, he made a single first-class appearance for the Marylebone Cricket Club against Oxford University in 1910. In this match, he scored 5 runs in the MCC first-innings, before being dismissed by Frank Tuff, while in their second-innings he was dismissed for a duck by Philip Le Couteur, in a match which the Oxford University v Marylebone Cricket Club won by 259 runs. Four years later he played his first first-class match for the Free Foresters against Oxford University, with his second and final first-class appearance for the Free Foresters coming after World War I, against Cambridge University in 1921. He later played for Buckinghamshire as an opening batsman, making his debut for the county in the 1925 Minor Counties Championship against the Kent Second XI. He played Minor counties cricket for Buckinghamshire from 1925 to 1927, making 8 Minor Counties Championship appearances.

== Military career ==
With the start of World War I in 1914, Buchanan was joined up with the Grenadier Guards as a second lieutenant in August of that year. In September 1917 he was still serving in the Grenadier Guards, by this time he held the full rank of lieutenant and the temporary rank of acting captain, it was in this month that he was mentioned in dispatches in the London Gazette as having been awarded the Military Cross.

For conspicuous gallantry and devotion to duty during an attack. He led his company with great skill and determination, capturing two enemy strong points, together with two machine guns, seven officers, and about sixty men. The success of the action on this part of the field was entirely due to his fine leadership, and his men were greatly encouraged by his personal example and admirable coolness under fire.

— London Gazette, 9 January 1918, reporting on the rationale behind his Military Cross,

In June 1919, Buchanan was awarded the Distinguished Service Order. By 1919, he held the temporary rank of major, but later relinquished his appointment on 2 April 1919.

== Personal life ==
Buchanan spent part of his life living in the Buckinghamshire village of Bledlow Ridge for some time. He married Nancy Isabel Bevan, and together they had four children: John David Buchanan MBE (headmaster of Oakham School, 1958–1977); Mary Elizabeth Ward, née Buchanan; Peter Alexander Buchanan; and Arthur Geoffrey Buchanan (who died fighting in North Africa, 1943). Buchanan died in St John's Wood, London on 31 October 1969. He was the nephew of Edward Leigh.
