= John Murdoch Buchanan =

John Murdoch Buchanan (1897–1975) was a businessman and Chancellor of the University of British Columbia (UBC) from 1966 to 1969.

== Biography ==
Born in Steveston, British Columbia on 21 July 1897, in 1917 Buchanan became an early graduate of UBC. He was one of the founders of the UBC Alumni Association, and served on the university's Senate and Board of Governors. He was elected Chancellor in 1966.

Buchanan received an honorary doctorate from UBC in 1970.

He died on board a cruise ship in the Atlantic on 24 April 1975.
