= John Lanne Buchanan =

John Lanne Buchanan (fl. 1780–1816), was a Scottish author and a native of Menteith, Perthshire, and was educated at the grammar school of Callander and the University of Glasgow. For some years, he was assistant to Robert Menzies, minister of Comrie, and after he died in 1760, he went as a missionary of the Church of Scotland to the Western Isles. He later resided in London.

== Works ==
He was the author of:

- Travels in the Western Hebrides from 1783 to 1790 (1793)
- A Defence of the Scots Highlanders in general, and some learned characters in particular (1794)
- General View of the Fishery of Great Britain (1794)

Having entrusted his Travels in the Highlands to the editorial care of Dr. William Thomson, the latter without his knowledge inserted some severe criticisms of the Scotch clergy and others, which Buchanan in his General View of the Fishery of Great Britain indignantly disclaimed.

=== Travels in the Western Hebrides ===
This book was reviewed in The Critical Review, The Gentleman's Magazine, The Analytical Review, The British Critic, The Monthly Review The New Annual Register, and The London Review.

=== Defence of the Scots Highlanders ===
This book was reviewed in The Critical Review, The Gentleman's Magazine, The Analytical Review, The British Critic and The Monthly Review.

=== General View of the Fishery of Great Britain ===
This book was reviewed in The Critical Review The Gentleman's Magazine, The British Critic and The Monthly Review.
