= Alexander Cunningham (jurist) =

Scottish jurist and chess player

Position: a8 black rook, b8 black knight, c8 black bishop, d8 black queen, e8 black king, g8 black knight, h8 black rook, a7 black pawn, b7 black pawn, c7 black pawn, d7 black pawn, e7 black bishop, f7 black pawn, g7 black pawn, h7 black pawn, e4 white pawn, f4 black pawn, f3 white knight, a2 white pawn, b2 white pawn, c2 white pawn, d2 white pawn, g2 white pawn, h2 white pawn, a1 white rook, b1 white knight, c1 white bishop, d1 white queen, e1 white king, f1 white bishop, h1 white rook

Cunningham Defence (3...Be7) in the KGA

Alexander Cunningham of Block (1655–1730) was a Scottish jurist and chess player. As a classical critic, he was known as an opponent of Richard Bentley.

== Life ==
The son of the Rev. John Cunningham, minister of Cumnock in Ayrshire, and proprietor of the small estate Block, was born there between 1655 and 1660. He was probably educated both in the Netherlands and at Edinburgh, and was selected by William Douglas, 1st Duke of Queensberry to be tutor to his son, Lord George Douglas. Through the Queensberry influence he was appointed by the Crown to be professor of civil law in the university of Edinburgh about 1698.

In 1710, when the Duke of Queensberry was out of favour with the other Whig leaders, the magistrates of Edinburgh asserted their ancient right and ousted Cunningham from the professorship to make way for their own nominee. He then left Scotland, and established himself at The Hague, where he lived on a pension granted him by the Duke of Queensberry, devoting himself to chess and the study of the classical authors and of civil law.

== Works ==
Cunningham became a friend of Pieter Burman the Elder. In 1711 he discovered from Thomas Johnson, a Scottish bookseller and publisher at The Hague, that Richard Bentley was the author of the criticism inflicted on his friend Jean Leclerc for his edition of the fragments of Menander. In 1721 he published a malevolent Alexandri Cuninghamii Animadversiones in Richardi Bentleii Notas et Emendationes ad Q. Horatium Flaccum. In the same year he published his own critical edition of Horace, as Q. Horatii Flacci Poemata. He also worked at his editions of Virgil and Phædrus, published at Edinburgh after his death, and projected books on the Pandects and the evidences of Christianity. His posthumous works, published in Edinburgh, were:

- P. Virgilii Maronis Bucolica, Georgica et Æneis, ex recensione Alexandri Cuninghamii Scoti, cujus emendationes subjiciuntur, 1743; and
- Phædri Augusti, liberti, Fabularum Æsopiarum libri quinque, ex emendatione Alexandri Cuninghamii Scoti, accedunt Publii Syri et aliorum veterum Sententiæ, 1757.

== Cunningham Gambit ==
Position: a8 black rook, b8 black knight, e8 black king, h8 black rook, a7 black pawn, b7 black pawn, c7 black pawn, f7 black pawn, g7 black pawn, h7 black pawn, f6 black queen, d4 white pawn, e4 white pawn, f4 black pawn, g4 black bishop, h4 black bishop, f3 white knight, a2 white pawn, b2 white pawn, c2 white pawn, d2 white queen, e2 white king, g2 white pawn, h2 white pawn, a1 white rook, c1 white bishop, f1 white bishop, h1 white rook

Sample position in the Cunningham Defense

It was as a chess-player that Alexander Cunningham was famous at the Hague. He was visited by players from all parts of Europe, and was on good terms with the English ambassadors at The Hague, especially with Lord Sunderland.

In his 1847 Chess Player's Handbook, Howard Staunton published 5 sample lines in the Cunningham Gambit: Kings Gambit Accepted (1.e4 e5 2.f4 exf4), King's Knight's Gambit (3.Nf3), 3...Be7. The e7 Black bishop threatens a check on h4 that can permanently prevent White from castling.

A sample line is 4.Nc3 Bh4+ 5.Ke2 d5 6.Nxd5 Nf6 7.Nxf6+ Qxf6 8.d4 Bg4 9.Qd2 (diagram). White has strong central control with pawns on d4 and e4, while Black is relying on the white king's discomfort to compensate. White did not develop his f1 king's bishop immediately and was forced to play Ke2, which hems the bishop in.

Now more commonly known as the Cunningham Defence (1.e4 e5 2.f4 exf4 3.Nf3 Be7) is tabulated as C35 King's Gambit Accepted, Cunningham Defense in the Encyclopaedia of Chess Openings.

To avoid having to play Ke2, 4.Bc4 is White's most popular response. In modern practice, it is more common for Black to simply develop instead with 4...Nf6 5.e5 Ng4, known as the Modern Cunningham.

== Notes ==
Attribution

This article incorporates text from a publication now in the public domain: Stephen, Leslie, ed. (1888). "Cunningham, Alexander (1655?-1730)". Dictionary of National Biography. Vol. 13. London: Smith, Elder & Co.
