= History of Karachi =

The area of Karachi (Urdu: کراچی, Sindhi: ڪراچي) in Sindh, Pakistan contains a natural harbor and has been strategically used as fishing port by local fishermen belonging to Sindhi tribes since prehistorical times. Archaeological excavations have uncovered a period going back to the Indus Valley Civilisation, which shows the significance of the city's strategic location since the Bronze Age. The port city of Banbhore was established close to the area which now situates modern-day Karachi, where it served as an important trade hub in the region. Throughout its lifetime, the ancient Greeks referred to the port by a variety of names, such as Krokola, Morontobara, Barbarikon (a sea port of the Indo-Greek Greco-Bactrian Kingdom), and as Ramya according to some Greek texts. The Arabs knew it as the port of Debal, from where the Umayyad commander Muhammad bin Qasim led his conquering forces into Sindh on 712 AD. Lahari Bandar (alternatively, Lari Bandar) succeeded Debal as a major port of the Indus; it was located close to Banbhore in modern-day Karachi. The first modern port city near Manora Island (now Manora Peninsula) was eventually established during the British colonial rule in the latter half of the 19th century.

== Names ==
The ancient names of Karachi include Krokola, Barbarikon, Nawa Nar, Rambagh, Kurruck, Karak Bander, Auranga Bandar, Minnagara, Kolachi, Morontobara, Kolachi-jo-Goth, Banbhore, Debal, Barbarice, and Kurrachee.

== Early history ==
=== Pre-history ===
The Late Paleolithic and Mesolithic sites, which were discovered by archaeologists from Karachi University on the Mulri Hills in front of the university campus, constitute as some of the most important archaeological findings made in Sindh during the last fifty years. The last hunter-gatherers, who left abundant traces of their passage, repeatedly inhabited the hills. According to surveyal accounts of the surface, up to twenty different spots of flint tools were discovered.

=== Indus Valley Civilisation ===
Some archaeological sites from the Indus Valley civilisation periods situated around the District of Karachi include Allahdino and Pir Shah Jurio, wherein floor tiles of a house have been discovered at the site of Allahdino.

=== Greek visitors ===
The ancient Greeks recorded the place by many names: Karachi is identified with Krokola, where Alexander the Great camped in 326 BCE to prepare a fleet for Babylon after his campaign in the Indus Valley; Morontobara, from whence Alexander's admiral Nearchus set sail; and Barbarikon, which was a port of the Greco-Bactrian Kingdom.

=== Debal and Bhanbhore ===
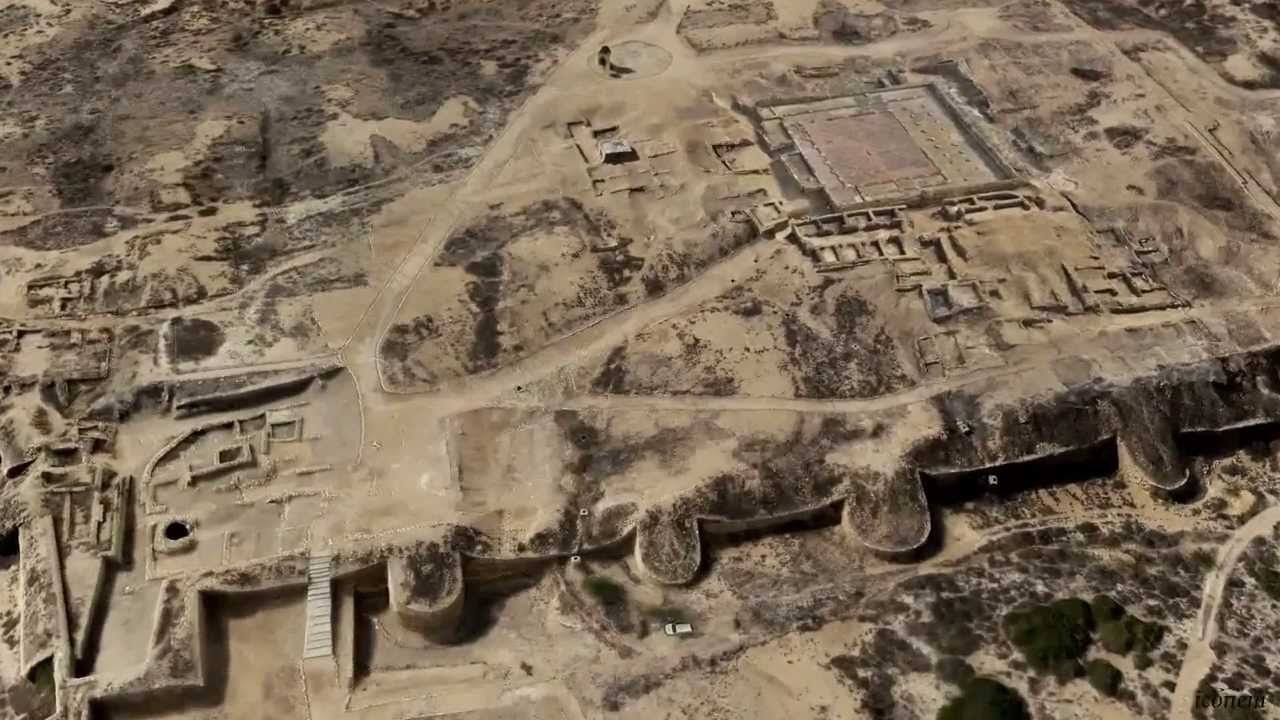
Archaeological ruins of Bhanbore

Debal and Bhanbhore (also spelled as Banbore) were the ancient port cities established near the present-day modern city of Karachi. It dates back to the Scytho-Parthian era and was later controlled by Hindu and Buddhist kingdoms before falling into Umayyad possession in the 8th century CE. In the 13th century it was subsequently abandoned. Remains of one of the earliest known mosques in the region dating back to 727 AD are still preserved in the city. The 1st century Greek geographer Strabo mentions the export of rice from near present-day Karachi and the Gulf of Cambay to Arabia.

According to the Abbasid-era historian Al-Baladhuri, a large minaret of a temple existed in Debal whose upper portion was knocked down by Ambissa Ibn Ishak and converted into a prison. Simultaneously, the ruined town was also repaired using the stones of minaret.

== Post Islamic era (8th century AD – 19th century) ==
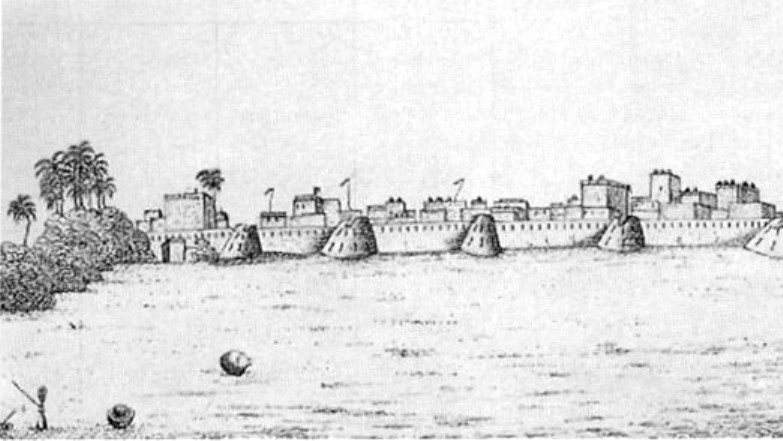
A sketch of the old fort at Karachi from the 1830s

=== Umayyad dynasty ===
In AD 711, Muhammad bin Qasim, a commander of the Umayyad dynasty, conquered Sindh and Indus Valley, bringing South Asian societies into contact with Islam, succeeding partly because Raja Dahir was a Hindu king that ruled over a Buddhist majority and that Chach of Alor and his kin were regarded as usurpers of the earlier Buddhist Rai dynasty this view is questioned by those who note the diffuse and blurred nature of Hindu and Buddhist practices in the region, especially that of a royalty to be patrons of both and those who believe that Chach himself may have been a Buddhist. The forces of Muhammad bin Qasim defeated Raja Dahir in alliance with the Jats and other regional governors.

=== Mughal Era ===
The Mughal Empire extended its control over various regions of the Indian subcontinent, including present-day Pakistan, during the reign of Emperor Akbar in the late 16th century. In 1592, the Mughals annexed Sindh, bringing areas like Karachi under imperial authority. Their rule introduced centralized administration, land revenue systems, and architectural influences. While urban centers came under stronger Mughal control, many peripheral regions—such as parts of Balochistan—remained semi-autonomous, with local tribes like the Baloch maintaining their influence through periodic alliances and resistance. Mughal control in these regions gradually weakened in the 18th century due to internal decline and external invasions, eventually paving the way for local dynasties and later British colonization.

=== Kalhora dynasty ===
The Kalhoras established the port Kharak Bundar near Karachi. In 1729, immigrants from the silting-up port of Kharak relocated to found Karachi near the Hub River mouth. Initially, Karachi was a modest settlement, but its trade grew as other ports like Shahbandar and Keti Bandar also silted up. According to some legends, Karachi is named after a fisherwoman called Mai Kolachi. The name Karachee was used for the first time in a Dutch document from 1742, in which a merchant ship de Ridderkerk is shipwrecked near the original settlement.

=== Talpur dynasty ===
In 1795, the city came under the control of the Talpur Mirs of Hyderabad and was ruled by them until it was occupied by the Bombay Army under the command of John Keane on 2 February 1839.

== Colonial period (1839–1947) ==
=== Company rule ===
After sending a couple of exploratory missions to the area, the British East India Company conquered the town on February 3, 1839. The town was later annexed to the British Indian Empire when Sindh was conquered by Charles James Napier in the Battle of Miani on February 17, 1843. Karachi was made the capital of Sindh in the 1840s. On Napier's departure it was added along with the rest of Sindh to the Bombay Presidency, a move that caused considerable resentment among the native Sindhis. The British realised the importance of the city as a military cantonment and as a port for exporting the produce of the Indus River basin, and rapidly developed its harbour for shipping. The foundations of a city municipal government were laid down and infrastructure development was undertaken. New businesses started opening up and the population of the town began rising rapidly.

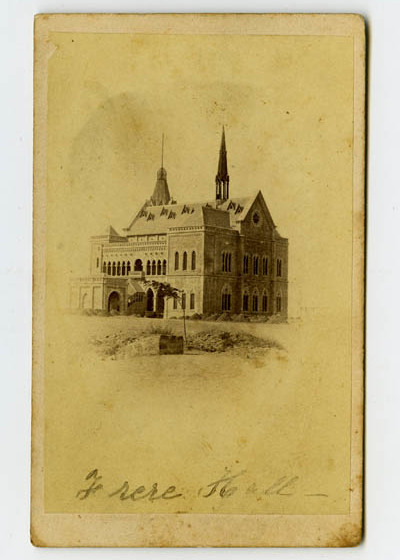
Frere Hall, Karachi, c. 1860

The arrival of troops of the Kumpany Bahadur in 1839 spawned the foundation of the new section, the military cantonment. The cantonment formed the basis of the 'white' city where the Indians were not allowed free access. The 'white' town was modeled after English industrial parent-cities where work and residential spaces were separated, as were residential from recreational places.

Karachi was divided into two major poles. The 'black' town in the northwest, now enlarged to accommodate the burgeoning Indian mercantile population, comprised the Old Town, Napier Market and Bunder, while the 'white' town in the southeast comprised the Staff lines, Frere Hall, Masonic lodge, Sindh Club, Governor House and the Collectors Kutchery [Law Court] /kəˈtʃɛri/ located in the Civil Lines Quarter. Saddar bazaar area and Empress Market were used by the 'white' population, while the Serai Quarter served the needs of the native population.

The village was later annexed to the British Indian Empire when the Sindh was conquered by Charles Napier in 1843. The capital of Sindh was shifted from Hyderabad to Karachi in the 1840s. This led to a turning point in the city's history. In 1847, on Napier's departure the entire Sindh was added to the Bombay Presidency. The post of the governor was abolished and that of the Chief Commissioner in Sindh established.

The British realized its importance as a military cantonment and a port for the produce of the Indus basin, and rapidly developed its harbor for shipping. The foundation of a city municipal committee was laid down by the Commissioner in Sinde, Bartle Frere and infrastructure development was undertaken. Consequently, new businesses started opening up and the population of the town started rising rapidly. Karachi quickly turned into a city, making true the famous quote by Napier who is known to have said: Would that I could come again to see you in your grandeur!

In 1857, the Indian Mutiny broke out, and the 21st Native Infantry stationed in Karachi declared allegiance to rebels, joining their cause on 10 September 1857. Nevertheless, the British were able to quickly reassert control over Karachi and defeat the uprising. Karachi was known as Khurachee Scinde (i.e. Karachi, Sindh) during the early British colonial rule.

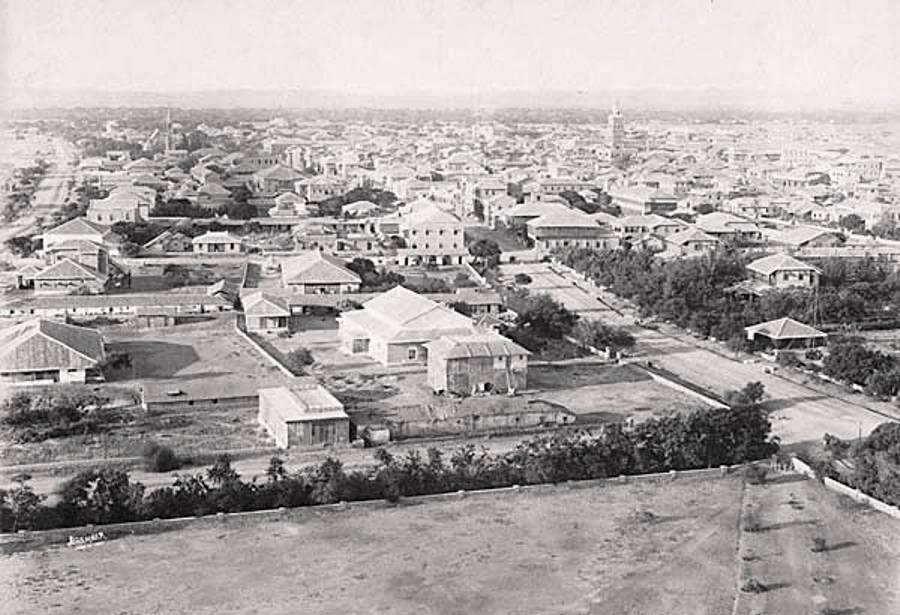
An old image of Karachi from 1889

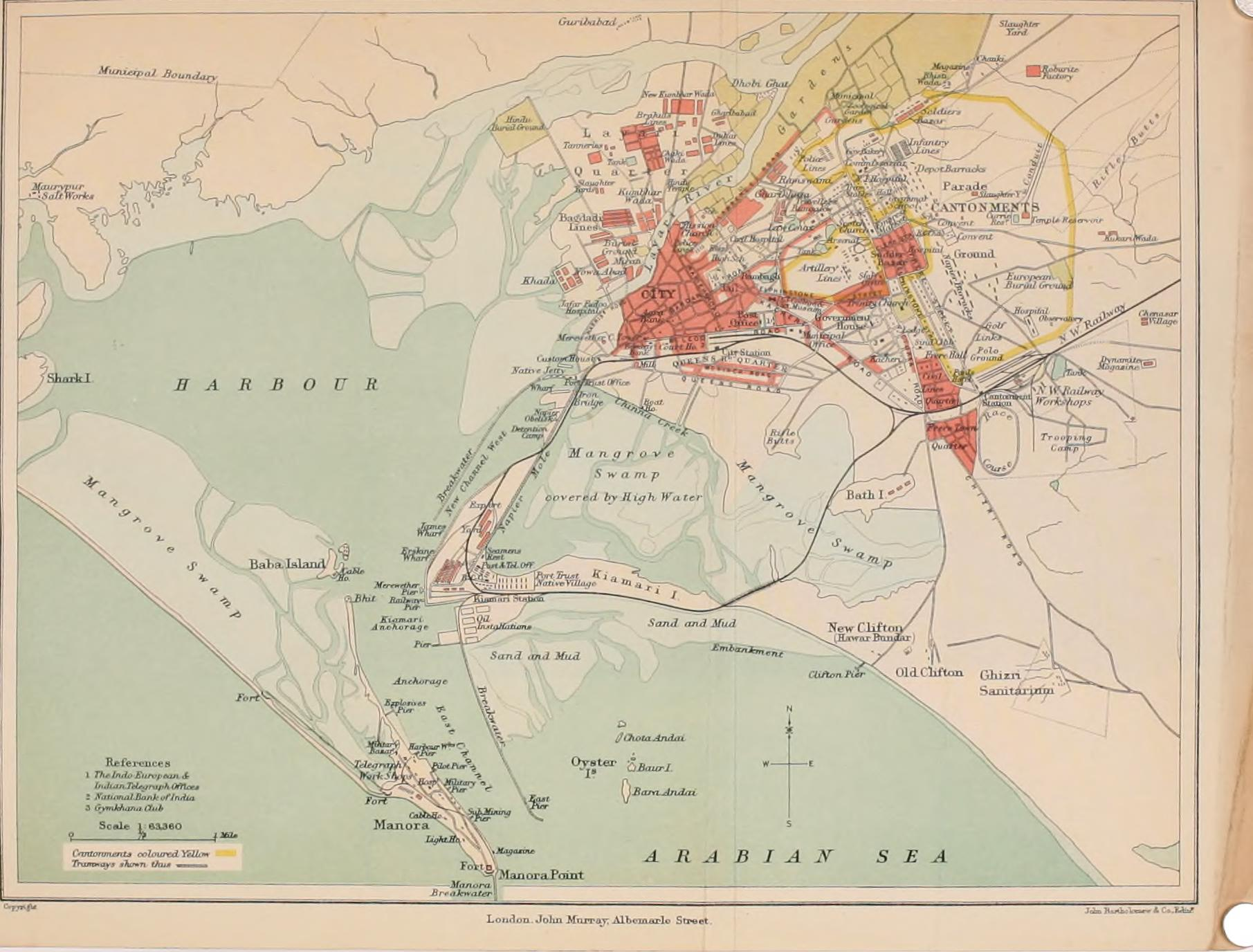
Karachi map, 1911

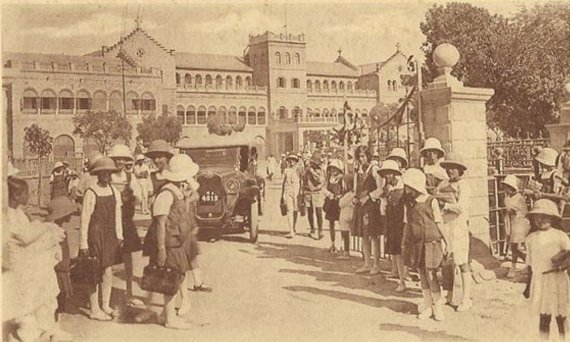
St Joseph's Convent School, Karachi

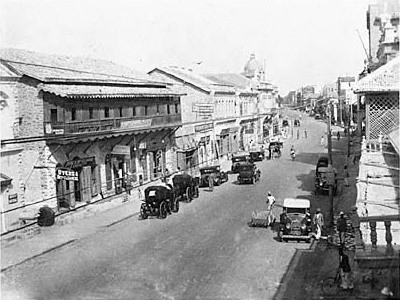
An image from 1930 of Elphinstone Street, Karachi

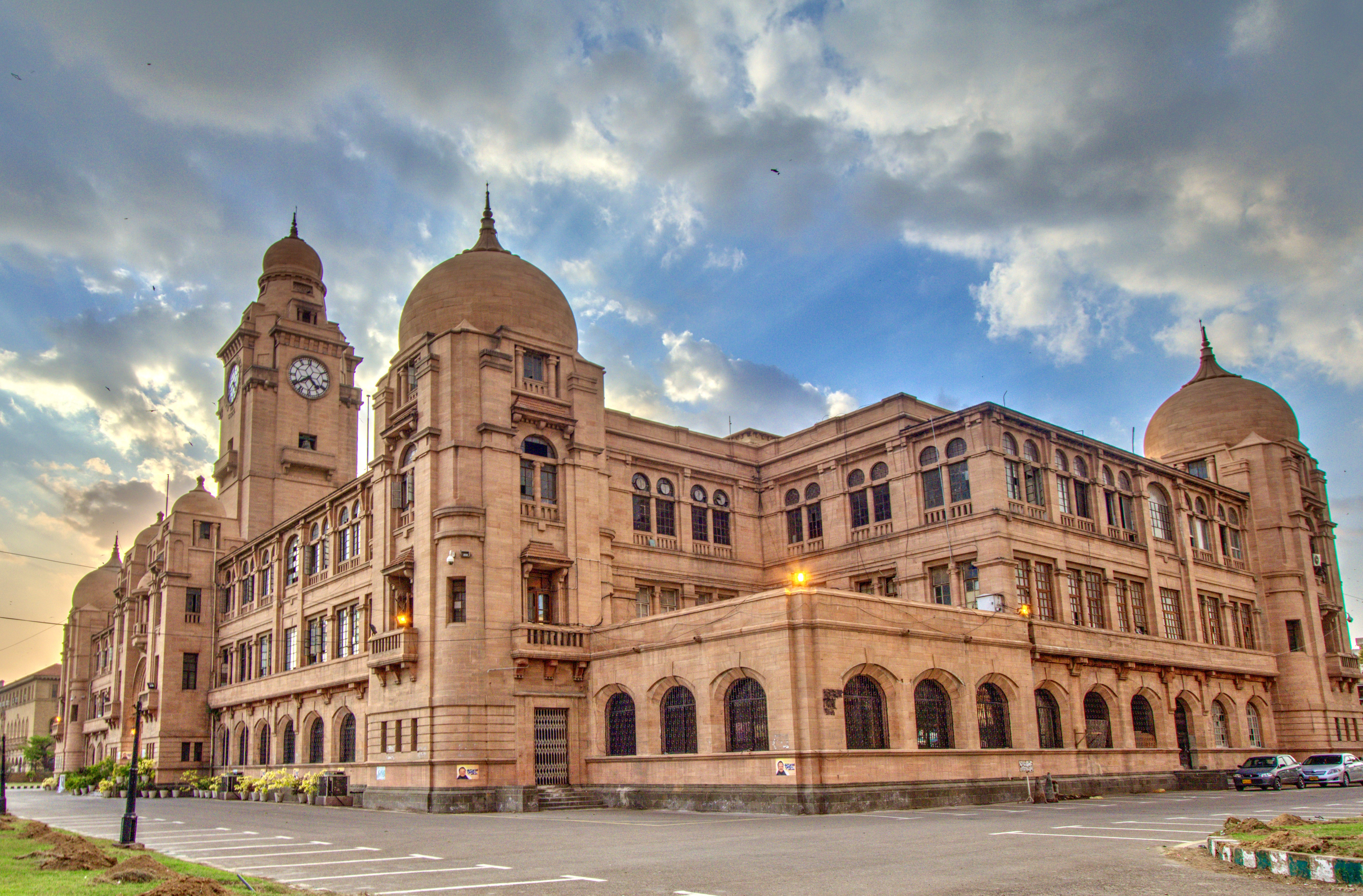
Karachi Municipal Corporation Building, inaugurated in 1932

In 1864, the first telegraphic message was sent from India to England when a direct telegraph connection was laid between Karachi and London. In 1878, the city was connected to the rest of British India by rail. Public building projects such as Frere Hall (1865) and the Empress Market (1890) were undertaken. In 1876, Muhammad Ali Jinnah, the founder of Pakistan, was born in the city, which by now had become a bustling city with mosques, temples, churches, courthouses, markets, paved streets and a magnificent harbour. By 1899, Karachi had become the largest wheat exporting port in the east. The population of the city was about 105,000 inhabitants by the end of the 19th century, with a cosmopolitan mix of Muslims, Hindus, Europeans, Jews, Parsis, Iranians, Lebanese, and Goans. The city faced a huge cholera epidemic in 1899. By around the start of the 20th century, the city faced street congestion, which led to South Asia's first tramway system being laid down in 1900.

The city remained a small fishing village until the British seized control of the offshore and strategically located at Manora Island. Thereafter, authorities of the British Raj embarked on a large-scale modernisation of the city in the 19th century with the intention of establishing a major and modern port which could serve as a gateway to Punjab, the western parts of British Raj, and Afghanistan. The city was predominantly Muslim with Sindhi and Baloch ethnic groups. Britain's competition with imperial Russia during the Great Game also heightened the need for a modern port near Central Asia, and so Karachi prospered as a major centre of commerce and industry during the Raj, attracting communities of: Africans, Arabs, Armenians, Catholics from Goa, Jews, Lebanese, Malays, Konkani people from Maharashtra, Kuchhi from Kuchh, Gujarat in India, and Zoroastrians (also known as Parsees)—in addition to the large number of British businessmen and colonial administrators who established the city's poshest locales, such as Clifton. This mass migration changed the religious and cultural mosaic of Karachi.

Port trust Building

British colonialists embarked on a number of public works of sanitation and transportation, such as gravel paved streets, proper drains, street sweepers, and a network of trams and horse-drawn trolleys. Colonial administrators also set up military camps, a European inhabited quarter, and organised marketplaces, of which the Empress Market is most notable. The city's wealthy elite also endowed the city with a large number of grand edifices, such as the elaborately decorated buildings that house social clubs, known as 'Gymkhanas.' Wealthy businessmen also funded the construction of the Jehangir Kothari Parade (a large seaside promenade) and the Frere Hall, in addition to the cinemas, and gambling parlours which dotted the city.

By 1914, Karachi had become the largest grain exporting port of the British Empire. In 1924, an aerodrome was built and Karachi became the main airport of entry into British Raj. An airship mast was also built in Karachi in 1927 as part of the Imperial Airship Communications scheme, which was later abandoned. In 1936, Sindh was separated from the Bombay Presidency and Karachi was made again the capital of the Sindh. In 1947, when Pakistan achieved independence, Karachi had become a bustling metropolitan city with beautiful classical and colonial European styled buildings lining the city's thoroughfares.

As the movement for independence almost reached its conclusion, the city suffered widespread outbreaks of communal violence between Muslims and Hindus, who were often targeted by the incoming Muslim refugees. In response to the perceived threat of Hindu domination, self-preservation of identity, the province of Sindh became the first province of British India to pass the Pakistan Resolution, in favour of the creation of the Pakistani state. The Muslim population supported Muslim League and Pakistan Movement. After the independence of Pakistan in 1947, Hindus and Sikhs migrated to India and this led to the decline of Karachi, as Hindus controlled the business in Karachi, while the Muslim refugees from India settled down in Karachi. While many poor low caste Hindus, Christians, and wealthy Zoroastrians (Parsees) remained in the city, Karachi's Sindhi Hindu migrated to India and was replaced by Muslim refugees who, in turn, had been uprooted from regions belonging to India.

== Post-Independence (1947 CE – present) ==
=== Pakistan's capital (1947–1959) ===
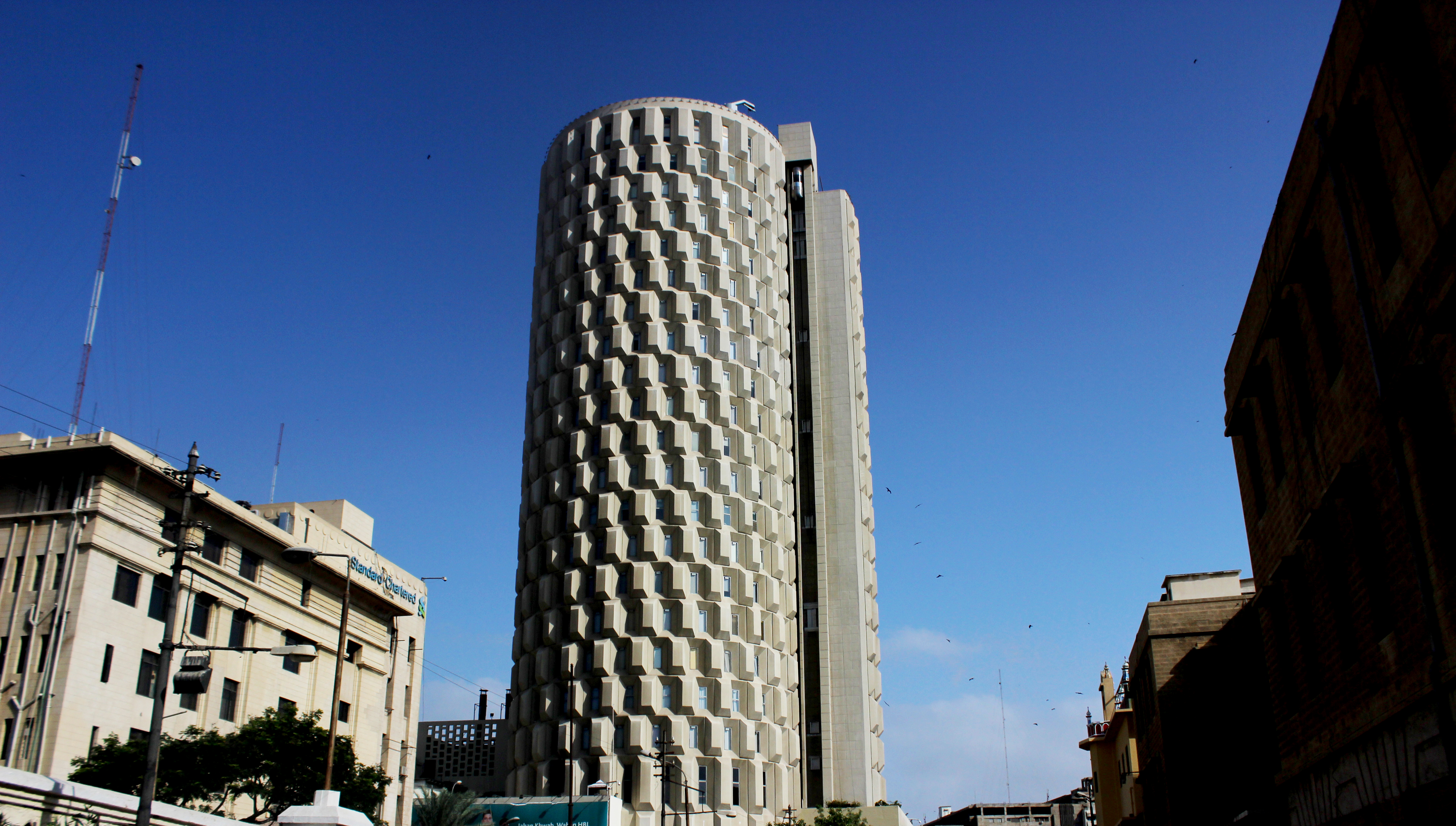
Habib Bank Plaza was the tallest building in Asia between 1963 and 1968.

Karachi became Pakistan's capital in 1947; by 1951, the population was 1.1 million. Although the capital shifted to Islamabad in 1959, Karachi continued to grow as Muslim refugees from India fleeing from anti-Muslim pogroms and other parts of South Asia came to settle in Karachi. As a consequence, the demographics of the city also changed drastically. The Government of Pakistan through Public Works Department bought land to settle the Muslim refugees.

=== Modern Population and Area ===
By 1990, the Karachi Division covered 3365 km^{2}, and by 2007 the population reached approximately 14.5 million. The city was influenced by Modernism, Mehdi Ali Mirza and others integrated contemporary styles, including Frank Lloyd Wright's and Le Corbusier's approaches, seen in notable buildings like Mehdi Ali Mirza's residence and the Karachi University complex. Notable Constructions include The Institute of Business Administration, designed by William Perry, and the Aga Khan Hospital and Medical College, reflect evolving architectural sophistication and cultural integration.

== Picture gallery ==
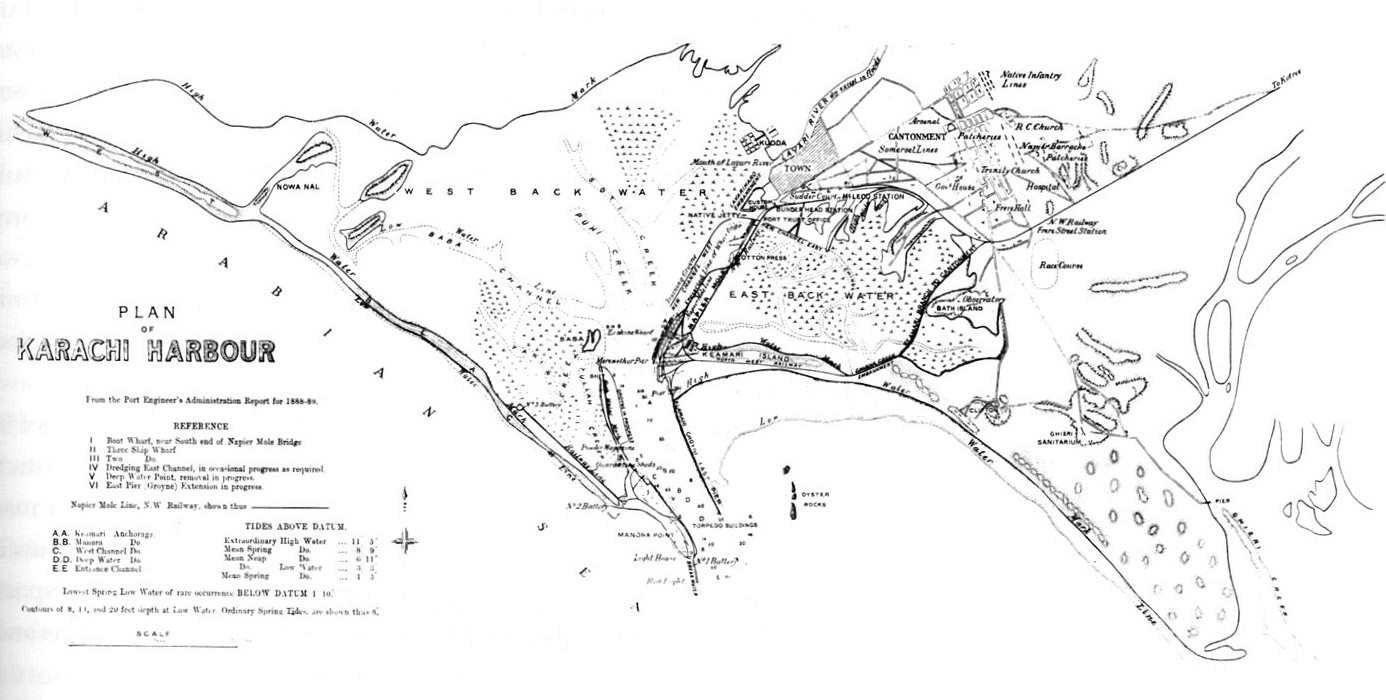
A map of Karachi from 1889

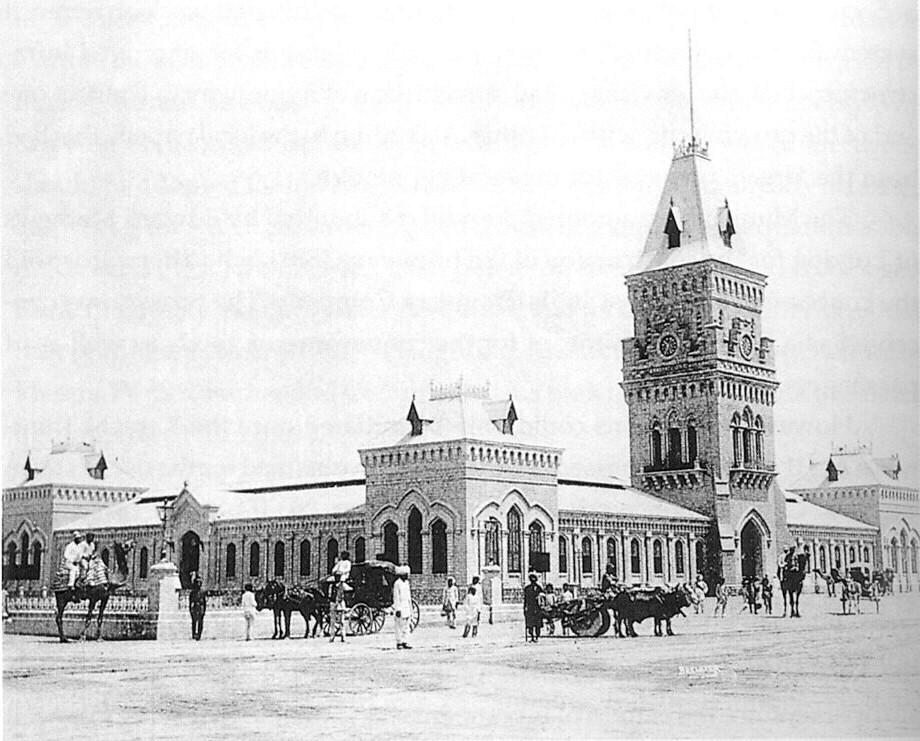
The Empress Market, 1890

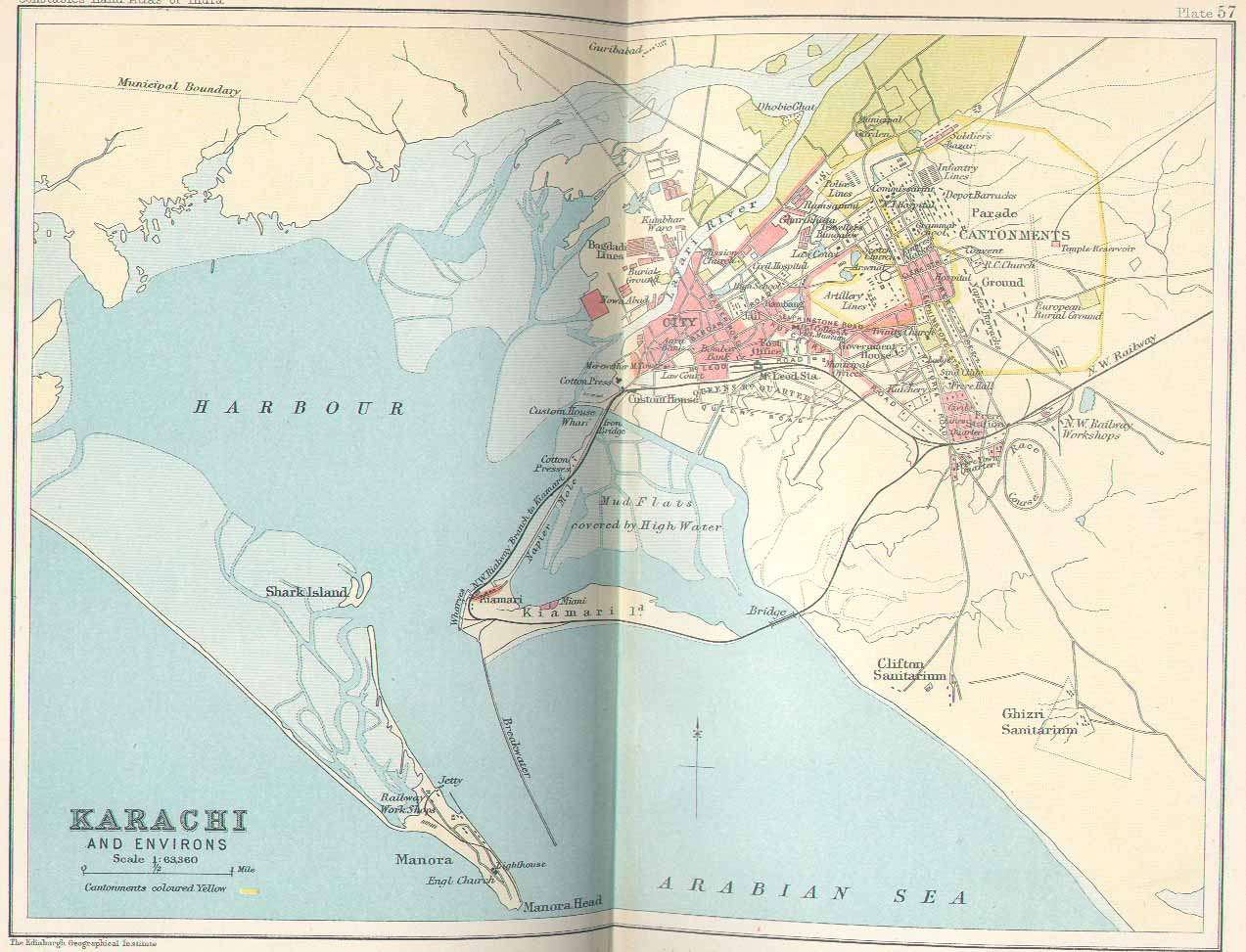
A map of Karachi from 1893

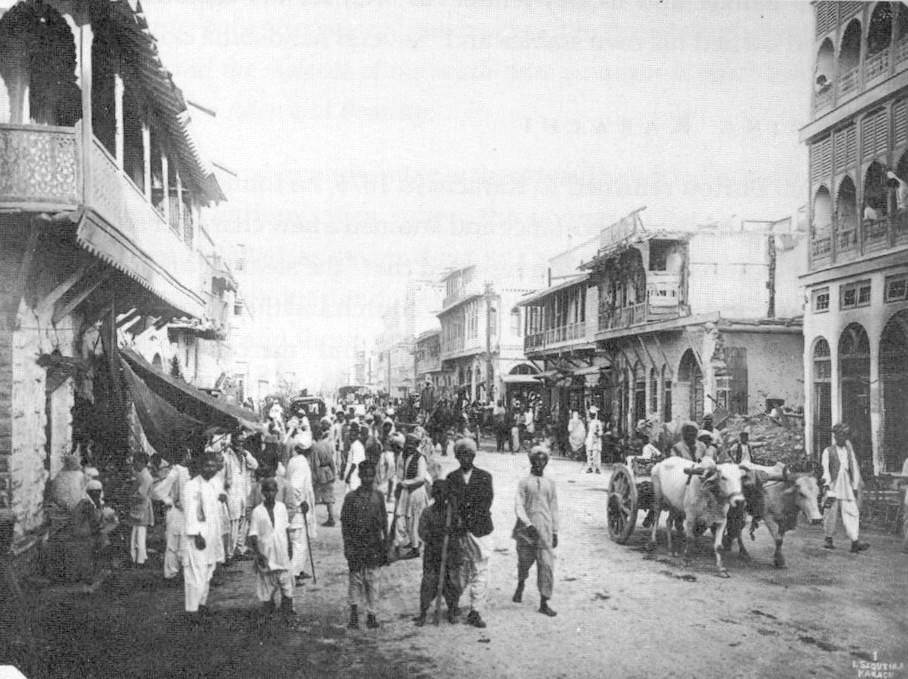
View of the dense old native town by the end of the 19th century

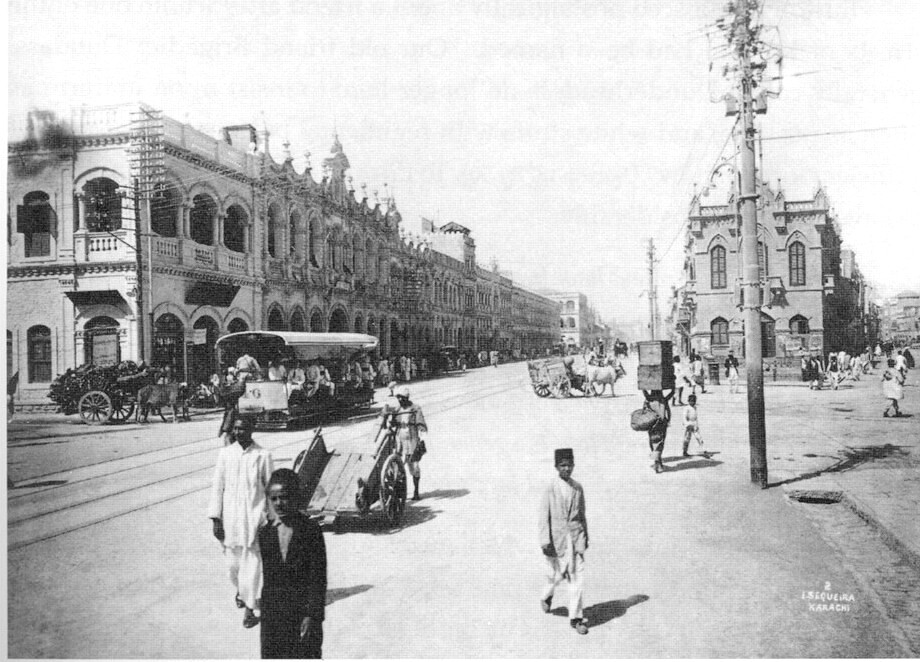
View of the Bunder Road (now M. A. Jinnah Rd.), 1900

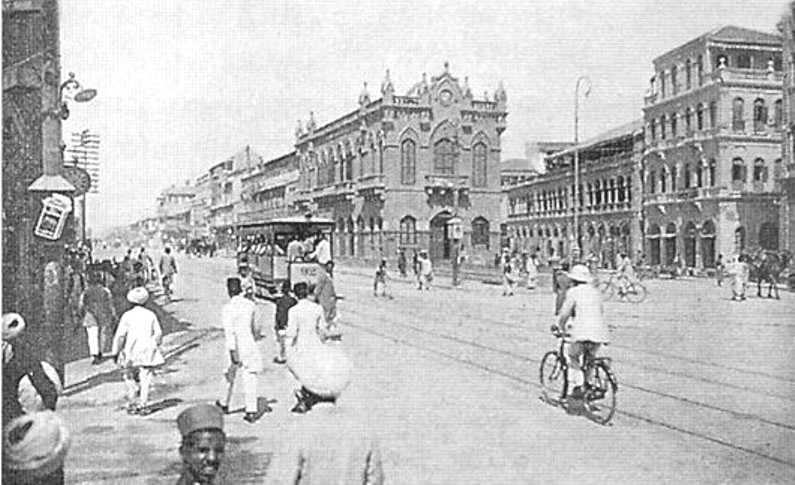
Bunder Road

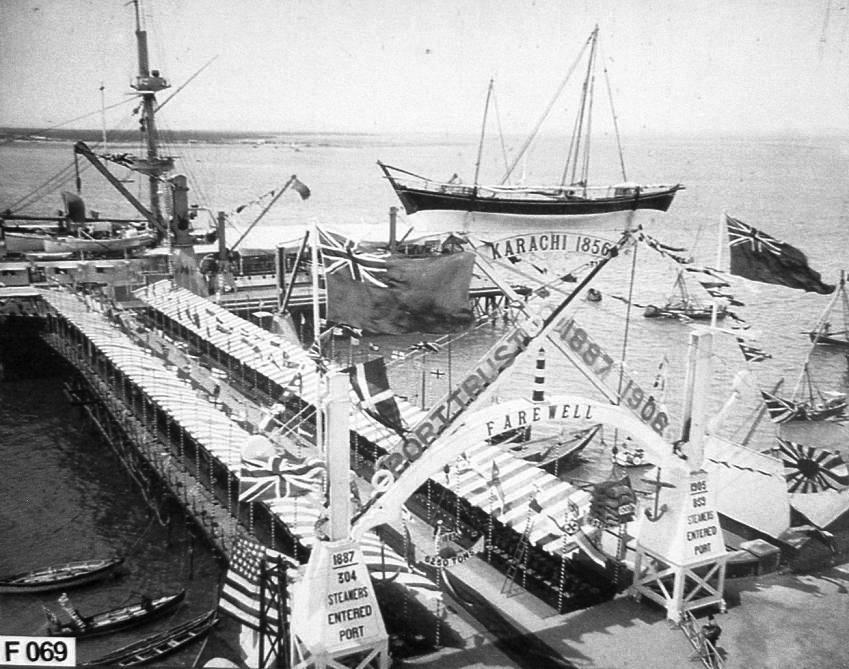
Farewell arch erected by the Karachi Port for the Royal visit of Prince of Wales, later King George V, 1906

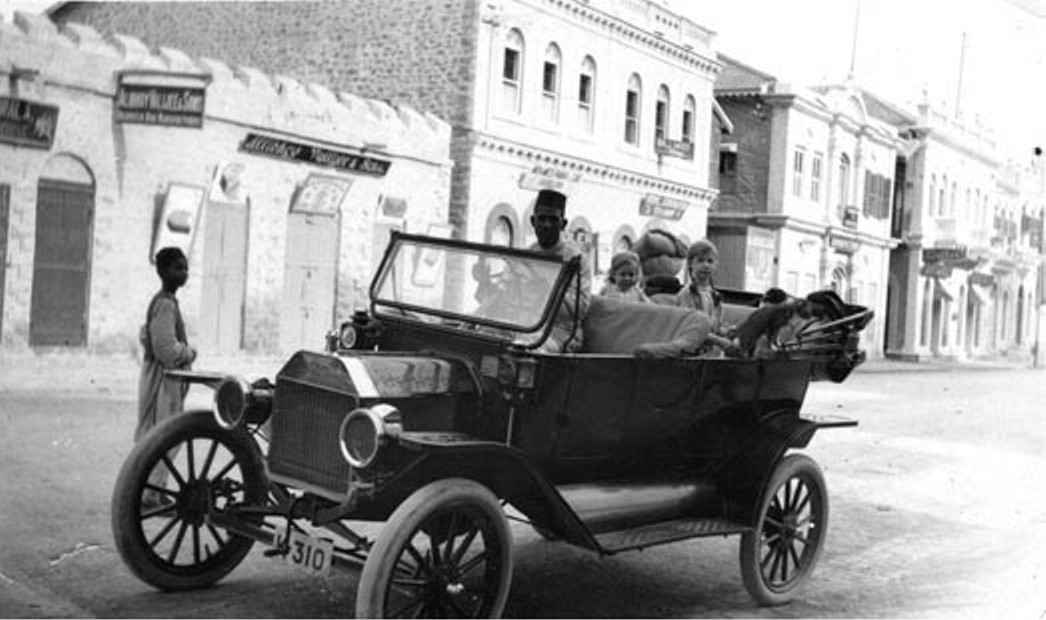
British family at Elphinstone St., 1914

== See also ==
- Demographic history of Karachi
- Abdullah Shah Ghazi
- Bhambore
- Culture of Karachi
- Debal
- Demographics of Karachi
- Economy of Karachi
- Education in Karachi
- History of Pakistan
- History of Sindh
- Karachi
- Kolachi jo Goth
- Kolachi
- Krokola
- Kulachi (tribe)
- Mai Kolachi
- Morontobara
- Muhammad bin Qasim
- Politics of Karachi
- Timeline of Karachi history
- Timeline of Karachi
