= Kolachi =

Kolachi (Urdu: کولاچی) may refer to

- Kolachi (port), a former port at Karachi, Pakistan, origin of the name Karachi
- Mai Kolachi (Lady Kolachi), legendary fisherwoman, said to be the namesake of Kolachi port
- Kolachi or Kulachi (tribe), a Baloch tribe also said to be the namesake of Kolachi port
- Kolachi, Dadu, a village in Mehar Tehsil, Dadu District, Pakistan
- Kalachi, Kazakhstan, a rural locality in Esil District, Akmola Region, Kazakhstan

== See also ==
- Kalochi, a village in Grevena, Greece
- Kulachi, a town and Kulachi Tehsil in Pakistan
- Kolach (cake), a central-European pastry sometimes known as Kolache
- Colachi, a volcano in Chile
