= Krokola =

Ancient port city

Krokola (Urdu: كروكولا, Ancient Greek: Κρόκολα) was an ancient port located in what is now the modern city of Karachi, in the Sindh province of Pakistan.

The area was known to the ancient Greeks: in fact, Krokola was the place where Alexander the Great camped to prepare a fleet for Babylonia after completing his campaign in the Indus valley.

The port city reached its height under the Hindu kings of the Brahman dynasty of Sindh, who ruled from their capital in neighboring capital Aror.

A major flyover (overpass) in Karachi has been named after Mai Kolachi. Some people claim that the settlement has also been known as Kolachi-jo-Goth.

== See also ==
- Kulachi
- Kulachi (tribe)
- Kolachi jo Goth
- Karachi
- Mai Kolachi
- Kolachi
- Debal
- Bhambore
- Barbarikon
