= Timeline of Karachi =

The following is a timeline of the history of the city of Karachi, Pakistan.

== Prior to 16th century ==
- 326 BCE Alexander the Great set sail from Manora island in Karachi to Babylonia
- 712 CE Muhammad bin Qasim conquers Sindh
- 977 to 1524 CE Ghaznavid Empire and then the Delhi Sultanate
- 1058 CE Soomra dynasty Soomro period from 1058 to 1351
- 1351 CE Samma dynasty assumed rule over Sindh
- 1526 - 1821 CE Mughal ascendancy (1526–1707), nominal rule by Mughals (1707–1857)
- 1521 - 1554 CE Arghun dynasty ruled Sindh
- 1555 - 1612 CE Tarkhan dynasty controlled Sindh
- 1568 CE Debal was attacked by the Portuguese Admiral Fernão Mendes Pinto in an attempt to capture or destroy the Ottoman vessels anchored there.
- 1612 - 1700 CE – Mughal Emperor Akbar conquers Sindh and ruled it via governors

== 16th-17th-18th-19th centuries ==
- Early 1600s Mughal Empire (Nominal Control)
- Mid-1600s Emergence of Khanate of Kalat
- Late 1600s Baloch Tribal Migration & Settlement
- Early 1700s Khan of Kalat exerts suzerainty over Lasbela and coastal Balochistan; influence reaches Karachi's outskirts.
- Mid 1700s – Kalhora dynasty Kalhoras attempt to consolidate power in Sindh, face resistance from autonomous Baloch tribes in coastal areas.
- 1729– Kalachi-jo Ghote founded.
- 1783 to 1843 CE – Talpur dynasty ruled Sindh
- 1838 - Population: 15,000.
- 1839 - British military occupation begins.
- 1843 - Town becomes part of colonial British India.
- 1847
  - Town becomes part of Sind Division, Bombay Presidency, British India.
  - Karachi Anglo-Indian School founded.
- 1852
  - Municipal Commission established.
  - Karachi Fair begins.
- 1854 - Napier Mole built connecting Kiamari Island.
- 1858– Agra and Masterman's Bank branch established.
- 1860– Karachi Chamber of Commerce established.
- 1861– St Patrick's High School, Karachi established
  - Scinde, Punjab & Delhi Railway (Kotri-Karachi) begins operating.
- 1862– St Joseph's Convent School (Karachi) established
- 1865– Frere Hall built.
- 1868– St Andrew's Church built.
- 1871– Sind Club founded.
- 1872 -
  - Karachi Boat Club founded.
  - Population: 62,384.
- 1873 - Manora breakwater constructed in harbour.
- 1878– Karachi Zoo established.
- 1881 - Population: 68,332 (town); 5,228 (cantonment).
  - Saint Patrick's Cathedral, Karachi built
- 1882– Sindh Arts College inaugurated.
- 1885 - Tramway begins operating.
- 1886
  - Denso Hall built.
  - Goa-Portuguese Association established.
- 1887– Karachi Port Trust opens.
- 1889– Empress Market built.
- 1891 - Population: 105,199.
- 1892– Merewether Clock Tower built.
- 1894 - Karachi Parsi Gymkhana established.
- 1898– Frere Street Station built.

== 20th century ==
=== 1900s-1940s ===
- 1901 - Population: 115,407.
- 1902 - Karachi is the capital of Province of Sind.
- 1910 - Young Men's Zoroastrian Association established.
- 1912 - Karachi Zarthosti Banu Mandal established.
- 1913
  - Karachi Electric Supply Company incorporated.
  - Karachi Race Club established.
- 1914– Freemasons Lodge built.
- 1916 - Sind Quadrangular cricket tournament established.
- 1920– Jehangir Kothari Parade inaugurated.
- 1921
  - Population: 216,000.
  - Prince of Wales Engineering College (now NED University of Engineering & Technology) founded.
- 1923– Ida Rieu School for blind, deaf, dumb and children with other disabilities was founded
- 1925– Hindu Gymkhana built.
- 1927– Mohatta Palace (residence) built.
- 1929– Airstrip active.
- 1932– Karachi Municipal Corporation Building inaugurated.
- 1933
  - Karachi Cotton Association incorporated.
  - Rotary Club established.
  - November: Jamshed Nusserwanjee Mehta becomes first elected Mayor of Karachi.
- 1934 - August: Teakum Dass Vadhumull becomes Mayor of Karachi.
- 1935 - May: Qazi Khuda Buksh becomes Mayor of Karachi.
- 1936
  - City becomes capital of Sindh Province, British India.
  - May: K.B. Aradsher H. Mama becomes Mayor of Karachi.
- 1937 - May: Durgha Das B. Adwani becomes Mayor of Karachi.
- 1938 - May: Hatim A. Alvi becomes Mayor of Karachi.
- 1939 - May: R.K. Sidhwa becomes Mayor of Karachi.
- 1940
  - Daily Jang newspaper begins publication.
  - May: Lalji Malhootra becomes Mayor of Karachi.
- 1941
  - Population: 435,000.
  - Dow Medical College established.
  - May: Muhammad Hashim Gazdar becomes Mayor of Karachi.
- 1942
  - Karachi Cantonment established by British Indian Army.
  - May: Sohrab K.H Katrak becomes Mayor of Karachi.
- 1943 - May: Shambo Nath Molraaj becomes Mayor of Karachi.
- 1944 - May: Yusuf Haroon becomes Mayor of Karachi.
- 1945
  - Advani College of Commerce & Economics established.
  - May: Manuel Misquita becomes Mayor of Karachi.
- 1946
  - Millat Gujarati-language newspaper begins publication.
  - May: Wishram Das Dewan Das becomes Mayor of Karachi.

=== Independence: since 1947 ===
- 1947
  - Karachi Stock Exchange founded.
  - Pakistan Institute of International Affairs headquartered in city.
  - Pakistan Navy headquartered in Liaquat Barracks.
  - University of Sindh founded.
  - May: Hakeem Muhammad Ahsan becomes Mayor of Karachi.
  - August: Dawn newspaper begins publication of Karachi edition.
- 1948
  - Beach Luxury Hotel built.
  - Federal Capital Territory administrative area created (containing Karachi city and surrounding area).
  - Holy Family Hospital, Karachi established.
  - St. Joseph's College for Women founded.
  - January: Pakistan Socialist Party founded.
  - May: Ghulam Ali Allana becomes Mayor of Karachi.
  - July: City becomes federal capital of Pakistan.
- 1949– Civil and Military Gazette Karachi edition begins publication.

=== 1950s-1990s ===
- 1950– Federation of Pakistan Chamber of Commerce & Industry headquartered in city.
- 1951
  - University of Karachi established.
  - National Museum of Pakistan opens in Frere Hall.
  - Population: 1,009,438 city; 1,126,417 urban agglomeration.
  - Edhi Foundation headquartered in city.
  - April: Allah Bakhsh Gabol becomes Mayor of Karachi.
- 1952
  - St. Patrick's College founded.
  - Nazimabad suburb developed.
- 1953
  - Karachi Municipal Aquarium built.
  - H.M. Habibullah Paracha becomes Mayor of Karachi.
- 1954
  - Pakistan Maritime Museum active.
  - Hamdard Foundation established.
  - January: Mahmoud Haroon becomes Mayor of Karachi.
- 1955
  - National Stadium opens.
  - May: Al-Haj Malik Bagh Ali becomes Mayor of Karachi.
- 1956 - May: Siddique Wahab becomes Mayor of Karachi.
- 1957– Karachi Development Authority, Pakistan Institute of Development Economics, and Pakistan National Scientific Documentation Centre established.
- 1958
  - Federal capital relocated from Karachi to Rawalpindi.
  - Karachi Press Club established.
  - May: S.M. Taufiq becomes Mayor of Karachi.
- 1959– Karachi Chamber of Commerce & Industry established.
- 1961
  - Adamjee Government Science College and Islamia Science College established.
  - Aisha Bawany Academy opens.
  - May: Allah Bakhsh Gabol becomes Mayor of Karachi for the second time.
- 1962– Daily News English-language newspaper begins publication.
- 1963
  - Construction begins on Habib Bank Plaza.
  - Aghaz Urdu-language newspaper begins publication.
  - Sindh Industrial Trading Estate established.
- 1964– Goethe-Institut Karachi active.
- 1965
  - Business Recorder newspaper begins publication.
  - Clifton Fish Aquarium opens.
- 1966– Pakistan Navy Engineering College active.
- 1968– Bambino Cinema opens.
- 1969
  - Karachi Circular Railway begins operating.
  - Hill Park laid out.
  - Masjid e Tooba (mosque) built.
- 1970
  - Jasarat Urdu-language newspaper begins publication.
  - Jinnah Mausoleum and Liaquat National Memorial Library constructed.
  - December: City hosts Islamic Foreign Ministers' conference.
- 1971 - December: Indo-Pakistani Naval War of 1971.
- 1972
  - Habib Bank Plaza completed.
  - Karachi labour unrest of 1972.
  - Aziz Bhatti Park developed.
  - November: Karachi Nuclear Power Plant commissioned.
  - Population: 3,498,634.
- 1973– Applied Economics Research Centre established at University of Karachi.
- 1975– Pakistan Naval Station Mehran (military base) commissioned.
- 1978
  - All Pakistan Muttahidda Students Organization founded.
  - Star Cinema opens in Saddar district.
  - Islamic Chamber of Commerce and Industry headquartered in city.
- 1979– Abdul Sattar Afghani becomes Mayor of Karachi.
- 1980
  - Orangi Pilot Project established.
  - Defence Housing Authority, Karachi opens.
- 1981
  - City area expands to 730 square miles (from 285 square miles).
  - Population: 5,180,562.
- 1985 - Karachi Hilton hotel built.
- 1986
  - August: Muttahida Qaumi Movement rally.
  - 5 September: Pan Am Flight 73 hijacked.
  - December: Pathan-Muhajir conflict.
- 1987 - VM Art Gallery founded.
- 1988
  - Qaumi Akhbar Urdu-language newspaper begins publication.
  - Farooq Sattar becomes Mayor of Karachi.
  - Defence Authority Degree College for Men established.
- 1989– Indus Valley School of Art and Architecture founded.
- 1990
  - Jago Sindhi-language newspaper begins publication.
  - Pakistan Air Force Museum and Quaid-e-Azam House museum established.
- 1992– Jinnah International Airport new terminal built.
- 1994– Daily Awam Urdu-language newspaper and Financial Post English-language newspaper begin publication.
- 1995– Shaheed Zulfiqar Ali Bhutto Institute of Science and Technology established.
- 1996
  - 20 September: Politician Murtaza Bhutto killed.
- 1997
  - Health Oriented Preventive Education was founded in July.
- 1998
  - Daily Express Urdu-language newspaper begins publication.
  - Faran Mosque built.
  - Population: 9,339,023.
- 2000
  - International Defence Exhibition and Seminar begins.
  - Karachi Central District divided into 4 towns: Gulberg Town, Liaquatabad Town, New Karachi Town, North Nazimabad Town.
  - Karachi East District divided into 4 towns: Gulshan Town, Korangi Town, Landhi Town, Shah Faisal Town.
  - Karachi South District divided into 3 towns: Jamshed Town, Lyari Town, Saddar Town.
  - Karachi West District divided into 4 towns: Baldia Town, Kemari Town, Orangi Town, SITE Town.
  - Malir District divided into 3 towns: Bin Qasim Town, Gadap Town, Malir Town.

== 21st century ==
=== 2000s ===
- 2001
  - Naimatullah Khan becomes Mayor of Karachi.
  - Vasl Artists' Collective founded.
  - Kara Film Festival begins.
- 2003 - Universe Cineplex opens.
- 2004– Karachi Dolphins cricket team formed.
- 2005
  - Syed Mustafa Kamal becomes Mayor of Karachi.
  - National Academy of Performing Arts established.
  - MCB Tower built.
- 2007
  - 12 May at least 42 people killed and 140 injured in riots when CJP Iftikhar Muhammad Chaudhry came to address the city bar association on the 50th anniversary of the establishment of the Supreme Court of Pakistan.
  - 18 October: Bombing of Benazir Bhutto motorcade.
  - Bagh Ibne Qasim (park) inaugurated.
- 2008
  - Peoples' Aman Committee founded in Lyari.
  - Arts Council Theatre Academy established.
- 2009
  - 13 December: Bank robbery.
  - Air pollution in Karachi reaches annual mean of 88 PM2.5 and 290 PM10, much higher than recommended.

=== 2010s ===
- 2010
  - Karachi Literature Festival begins.
  - Express Tribune English-language newspaper begins publication.
  - October: Bombing.
- 2011
  - Karachi Metropolitan Corporation revived.
  - 22 May: PNS Mehran attack.
  - September: Floods.
  - Dolmen Mall Clifton in business.
- 2012
  - April: Lyari police operation begins
  - 11 September: Garment factory fire in Baldia Town.
  - Ocean Tower built.
- 2013
  - 3 March: Bombing of Shia area in Abbas Town.
  - 26 June: Bombing on Burns Road.
  - 7 August: Bombing in Lyari.
- 2014
  - 21–22 February: Karachi Children's Literature Festival was held.
- 2015
  - 3 March: Karachi recognised as the cheapest city in the world by the Economist Intelligence Unit (EIU).
- 2017 - Population: 14,910,352.

=== 2020s ===
- 2020– Kemari District created.

== See also ==
- History of Karachi
- Timeline of Pakistani history
- Banbhore (near present-day Karachi), 1st century BCE - 13th century CE
- Timelines of other cities in Pakistan: Lahore, Peshawar
- Urbanisation in Pakistan

== Bibliography ==
=== Published in 19th century ===
- William Milburn; Thomas Thornton (1825). "Coasts of Persia, Scindy, and Guzerat: Crotchey". Oriental Commerce. London: Kingsbury, Parbury, and Allen.
- Charles Masson (1842), "(Karachi)", Narrative of Various Journeys in Balochistan, Afghanistan, and the Panjab, London: Richard Bentley
- Edward Thornton (1844), "Kurachee", A gazetteer of the countries adjacent to India on the northwest: including Sinde, Afghanistan, Beloochistan, the Punjab, and the neighbouring states, London: W.H. Allen, OCLC 6141828
- "Kurrachee (Karachi, Karkalla)". Bradshaw's Hand-Book to the Bombay Presidency and North-Western Provinces of India. London: W.J. Adams. 1864.
- Record of the Kurrachee fair and exhibition of 1869, 1870
- Albert William Hughes (1874). "Karachi". Gazetteer of the province of Sindh. London: George Bell & Sons.
- "Karachi", Handbook of the Bombay Presidency (2nd ed.), London: J. Murray, 1881, OCLC 2094004
- Edward Balfour (1885), "Karchi, or Kurachee", Cyclopaedia of India (3rd ed.), London: B. Quaritch

=== Published in 20th century ===
1900s–1940s

- Eustace Alfred Reynolds-Ball (1907). "Karachi and the Unhappy Valley". The Tourist's India. London: S. Sonnenschein.
- "Karachi" . Encyclopædia Britannica. Vol. 15 (11th ed.). 1911. pp. 672–673.
- J.W. Smyth (1919). Gazetteer of the Province of Sind. Vol. B Vol 1 Karachi District. Bombay: Government Central Press.

1950s–1990s

- Behram Sohrab H. J. Rustomji (1952), Karachi, 1839-1947: a short history of the foundation and growth of Karachi, Karachi: Kitabistan
- Herbert Feldman (1970), Karachi through a hundred years: the centenary history of the Karachi Chamber of Commerce and Industry, 1860-1960 (2nd ed.), Karachi: Pakistan Branch, Oxford University Press
- Azimusshan Haider (1980). History of Karachi Port. Karachi.
- Mohamed Amin; Duncan Willetts; Brian Tetley (1986). Karachi. Karachi: Pak American Commercial Ltd. OCLC 18529948.
- Karachi Development Plan 2000, Karachi Development Authority, 1990
- Soofia Mumtaz (1990), "Dynamics of Changing Ethnic Boundaries: A Case Study of Karachi" (PDF), Pakistan Development Review, 29 (3/4): 223–248, doi:10.30541/v29i3-4pp.223-248, JSTOR 41259434
- I. Banga (1992). "Karachi and its Hinterland under Colonial Rule". In I. Banga (ed.). Ports and their Hinterlands in India (1700-1950). Delhi. ISBN 8185425868.
- Mehtab S. Karim (1995), "Changing Demographic, Social, and Economic Conditions in Karachi City, 1959-94: A Preliminary Analysis" (PDF), Pakistan Development Review, 34 (4), Pakistan Institute of Development Economics: 1093–1106, doi:10.30541/v34i4IIIpp.1093-1106, JSTOR 41259925, S2CID 141776577
- Yasmeen Lari; Mihail S. Lari (1996), The dual city: Karachi during the Raj, Karachi: Heritage Foundation, Oxford University Press, ISBN 0195777352
- Moonis Ahmar (1996). "Ethnicity and State Power in Pakistan: The Karachi Crisis". Asian Survey. 36 (10): 1031–1048. doi:10.2307/2645632. JSTOR 2645632.
- S. Akbar Zaidi (20 December 1997). "Politics, Institutions, Poverty: The Case of Karachi". Economic and Political Weekly. 32 (51): 3282–3293. JSTOR 4406207.
- Hamida Khuhro and Anwer Mooraj, ed. (1997). Karachi: Megacity of our Times. Karachi: Oxford University Press. ISBN 0195778065.

=== Published in 21st century ===
- Mehtab Ali Shah (2001), "Criminalisation of Politics: Karachi, a Case Study", Ethnic Studies Report (19): 99–137
- "Karachi". Understanding Slums: Case Studies for the Global Report 2003. United Nations Human Settlements Programme and University College London. 2003.
- Behram Sohrab H J Rustomji; Sohrab K H Katrak (2007). Karachi during the British Era: two histories of a modern city. Karachi: Oxford University Press. ISBN 9780195474503.
- The Open City: Social Networks and Violence in Karachi, London: Crisis States Research Centre, 2010 – via International Relations and Security Network
