= Sleeping sickness (disambiguation) =

Sleeping sickness may refer to:

== Medical conditions ==
- African trypanosomiasis, also known as African sleeping sickness, is a vector-borne parasitic disease
- Animal trypanosomiasis, also known as nagana or animal African trypanosomiasis
- Eastern equine encephalitis virus, a zoonotic alphavirus and arbovirus present in North, Central and South America and the Caribbean
- Encephalitis lethargica, a form of encephalitis that swept the world in the 1920s, also known as "sleepy sickness"
- Sleeping sickness of Kalachi, Kazakhstan or "sleepy hollow", a conjectured medical condition which causes long bouts of sleep, at some point present in just two villages in Kazakhstan

== In arts and entertainment ==
- Sleeping Sickness (film), a 2011 German film
- "Sleeping Sickness" (song), a 2008 song by the band City and Colour
