= Urbanisation in Pakistan =

Factors that affect urbanization

Urbanisation in Pakistan has increased since the country's independence and has several different causes. The majority of southern Pakistan's population lives along the Indus River. Karachi is its most populous city. In the northern half of the country, most of the population lives in an arc formed by the cities of Lahore, Faisalabad, Rawalpindi, Islamabad, Gujranwala, Sialkot, Gujrat, Jhelum, Sargodha, Sheikhupura, Nowshera, Mardan and Peshawar. During 1990–2008, city dwellers made up 36% of Pakistan's population, making it the most urbanised nation in South Asia. Furthermore, 50% of Pakistanis live in towns of 5,000 people or more. Pakistan is one of South Asia's most rapidly urbanising countries, as of at least early 2024.

According to the 2023 digital census conducted by the Pakistan Bureau of Statistics, the urban population of Pakistan has increased to 38.82% of the total population. This marks a rise from 36.4% reported in the 2017 census. The total population has grown to 241.49 million, with the urban population now numbering approximately 93.75 million.

== Historical causes of urbanisation ==
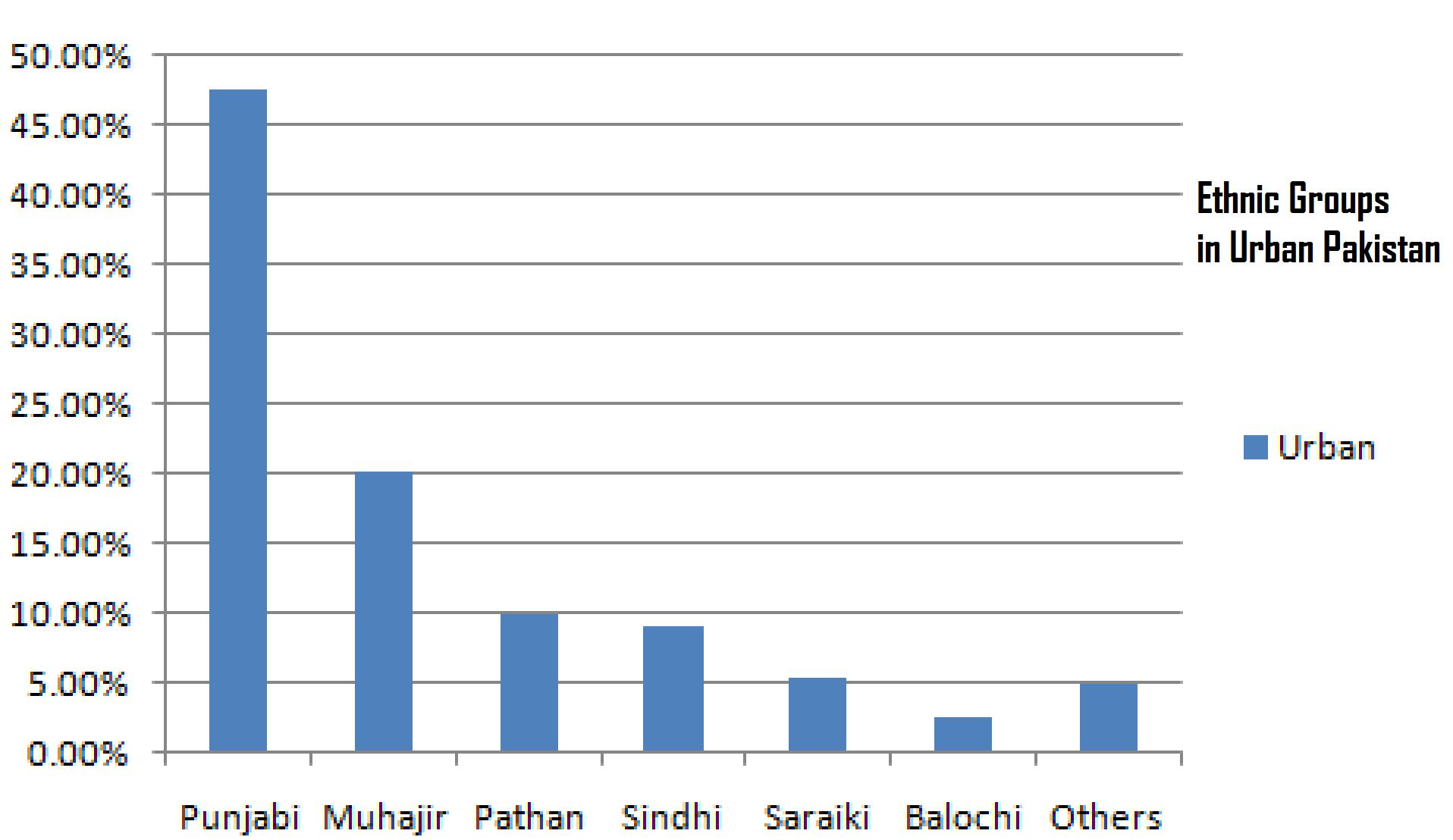
Ethnic Groups in Urban Pakistan

The British relinquished control of the colony in 1947 with the Great Partition of India and Pakistan, leaving the region in turmoil because of the vacuum of power, and the resulting mass migrations. The repercussions can still be seen today, as many still lack basic food and housing security in both India and Pakistan. Much of this was caused by the loss and destruction of property – and therefore capital and financial stability – during the migrations. Additionally, this rapid movement to and overcrowding of cities has led to the emergence of informal settlements, known as katchi abadis in Karachi.

Immigration, both from within and outside the country, is regarded as one of the main factors that have contributed to urbanisation in Pakistan. One analysis of the 1998 Pakistan Census highlighted the significance of the independence of Pakistan in 1947 in the 1940s in the context of understanding the urban change in Pakistan. During the independence period, Muslim Muhajirs from India migrated in large numbers and shifted their domicile to Pakistan, especially to the port city of Karachi, which is today the largest metropolis in Pakistan.

Migration from other countries, mainly those in the neighbourhood, has further catalysed the process of urbanisation in Pakistani cities. Of particular interest is migration that occurred in the aftermath of the independence of Bangladesh in 1971, in the form of stranded Biharis who were relocated to Pakistan. Smaller numbers of Bengalis and Burmese immigrants followed suit much later. The Soviet invasion in the 1980s forced millions of Afghan refugees into Pakistan, but most of them have been repatriated since 2002. Inevitably, the rapid urbanisation caused by these large population movements has also brought new political and socio-economic complexities.

In addition to immigration, economic events such as the Green Revolution and political developments, among a host of other factors, are also important causes of urbanisation.

As of at least early 2024, Pakistan is one of the most rapidly urbanising counties in south Asia.

== Province wise ==
In 1998, 32.52% of Pakistani lived in Urban areas and has risen to 36.38% in 2017. In the 2017 census, the Urbanization trend has increased in all administrative divisions of Pakistan except Islamabad Capital Territory, where it witnessed a sharp decline in Islamabad Capital Territory.In 1998, 65.72% of the population in Islamabad lived in urban areas and this dropped to 50.58% in 2017.

Sindh is the most urbanized province in Pakistan with 52.02% of its population living in urban areas. Sindh has seen an increase in Urbanization from 48.75% in 1998 to 52.02% in 2017.FATA is the least urbanised province with only 2.84% living in Urban areas

== Effects of urbanisation on public health ==
With the proliferation of slums comes a plethora of related issues, such as public health, infrastructural, and sanitation issues. The infrastructure cannot support the population size, and in the rural areas, plumbing/wells/etc. often cannot be afforded, leading to water contamination. Many water sources are highly contaminated because of the lack of regulations and monitoring by the government. As a result, there is industrial waste and sewage contaminating water sources, as well as high fluoride and arsenic contents, which is further exacerbated by monsoon flooding, thus causing many epidemics throughout the years. Studies have shown that there are critically high levels of nitrates and chlorides in Karachi's water sources as well as other water-born pathogens causing diarrhea and loss of nutrients, exacerbating the existing problem of malnutrition. Specifically, 1 in 5 "street children" in Pakistan were shown to be stunted, and 1 in about 8 were wasted.

== List of districts by urban population ==
District	Urban Pop. (2023)	Urban Pop. (2017)	Urban Pop. (1998)	Urban Pop. (1981)	Urban Pop. (1972)	Urban Pop. (1961)	Urban Pop. (1951)
Muzaffarabad	...	...	...	...	...		
Hattian Bala	...	...	...	...	...		
Neelum	...	...	...	...	...		
Mirpur	...	...	...	...	...		
Bhimber	...	...	...	...	...		
Kotli	...	...	...	...	...		
Poonch	...	...	...	...	...		
Bagh	...	...	...	...	...		
Haveli	...	...	...	...	...		
Sudhnati	...	...	...	...	...		
Ghanche	...	...	...	...	...		
Skardu	...	...	...	...	...		
Kharmang	...	...	...	...	...		
Shigar	...	...	...	...	...		
Astore	...	...	...	...	...		
Diamer	...	...	...	...	...		
Ghizer	...	...	...	...	...		
Gilgit	...	...	...	...	...		
Hunza	...	...	...	...	...		
Nagar	...	...	...	...	...		
Gupis-Yasin District	...	...	...	...	...	...	...
Haripur	147,765 (12.58%)						
Battagram	0 (0.00%)						
Abbottabad	332,315 (23.42%)						
Allai	...	...	...	...	...	...	...
Lower Kohistan	0 (0.00%)						
Mansehra	154,834 (8.62%)						
Torghar	0 (0.00%)						
Upper Kohistan	0 (0.00%)						
Kolai Palas	0 (0.00%)						
Hangu	85,727 (16.21%)						
Kurram	45,471 (5.79%)						
Karak	58,065 (7.12%)						
Kohat	278,741 (22.58%)						
Orakzai	0 (0.00%)						
Bajaur	0 (0.00%)						
Buner	0 (0.00%)						
Lower Chitral	57,157 (17.84%)						
Lower Dir	47,860 (2.90%)						
Shangla	0 (0.00%)						
Malakand	73,525 (8.90%)						
Swat	794,368 (29.56%)						
Upper Chitral	0 (0.00%)						
Upper Dir	47,842 (4.42%)						
Central Dir District	...	...	...	...	...	...	...
Charsadda	292,426 (15.93%)						
Khyber	94,707 (8.26%)						
Nowshera	341,959 (19.64%)						
Peshawar	1,905,975 (40.05%)						
Mohmand	0 (0.00%)						
Upper South Waziristan	...	...	...	...	...	...	...
Lower South Waziristan	...	...	...	...	...	...	...
Tank	49,172 (10.46%)						
Dera Ismail Khan	374,757 (20.48%)						
North Waziristan	4131 (0.60%)						
Bannu	48,398 (3.56%)	49,948 (4.28%)					
Lakki Marwat	103,089 (9.90%)	89,252 (10.19%)					
Swabi	339,670 (17.93%)						
Mardan	453,342 (16.52%)						
Jamshoro	521,746 (46.70%)						
Hyderabad	2,022,379 (83.14%)						
Badin	429,849 (22.08%)						
Dadu	439,034 (25.20%)						
Matiari	202,673 (23.86%)						
Sujawal	88,847 (10.59%)						
Tando Allahyar	285,687 (30.99%)						
Tando Muhammad Khan	162,142 (22.33%)						
Thatta	193,679 (17.88%)						
Ghotki	379,382 (21.40%)						
Khairpur	844,263 (32.50%)						
Sukkur	814,999 (49.70%)						
Karachi Central	3,822,325 (100.00%)						
Karachi East	3,921,742 (100.00%)						
Karachi South	2,329,764 (100.00%)						
Karachi West	2,430,428 (90.71%)						
Keamari	2,068,451 (100.00%)						
Korangi	3,128,971 (100.00%)						
Malir	1,166,340 (47.95%)						
Larkana	798,151 (44.73%)						
Jacobabad	361,917 (30.83%)						
Kashmore	271,782 (22.03%)						
Qambar Shahdadkot	421,865 (27.85%)						
Shikarpur	318,738 (22.99%)						
Mirpur Khas	492,175 (29.27%)						
Umerkot	258,859 (22.32%)						
Tharparkar	144,405 (8.12%)						
Sanghar	630,782 (27.32%)						
Shaheed Benazirabad	598,120 (32.42%)						
Naushahro Feroze	507,244 (28.54%)						
Hub	...	...	...	...	...	...	...
Surab	36,468 (13.07%)						
Lasbela	330,585 (48.55%)						
Mastung	40,374 (12.89%)						
Khuzdar	364,378 (36.54%)						
Kalat	44,440 (16.36%)						
Awaran	46,836 (26.17%)						
Barkhan	14,425 (6.86%)						
Duki	9,783 (4.77%)						
Musakhel	15,805 (8.67%)						
Loralai	59,601 (21.88%)						
Gwadar	159,035 (52.12%)						
Kech	386,646 (36.44%)						
Panjgur	157,693 (30.93%)						
Jafarabad	163,393 (27.48%)						
Jhal Magsi	24,130 (11.87%)						
Kachhi	80,452 (18.17%)						
Nasirabad	106,952 (18.99%)						
Sohbatpur	14,728 (6.13%)						
Usta Muhammad	...	...	...	...	...	...	...
Dera Bugti	108,447 (30.52%)						
Kohlu	18,978 (7.29%)						
Sibi	69,300 (30.92%)						
Harnai	33,433 (26.21%)						
Ziarat	49,402 (26.06%)						
Chaman	130,139 (27.91%)						
Pishin	243,785 (29.18%)						
Quetta	1,565,546 (60.32%)						
Qila Abdullah	35,384 (9.78%)						
Qilla Saifullah	64,175 (16.88%)						
Sherani	0 (0.00%)						
Zhob	46,976 (13.21%)						
Kharan	80,806 (31.04%)						
Nushki	48,572 (23.37%)						
Washuk	41,107 (13.58%)						
Chagai	20,054 (7.45%)						
Rawalpindi	4,210,785 (68.82%)						
Jhelum	541,318 (39.16%)						
Attock	623,984 (28.75%)						
Murree	...	...	...	...	...	...	...
Chakwal	434,805 (25.06%)						
Taunsa	...	...	...	...	...	...	...
Kot Addu	...	...	...	...	...	...	...
Layyah	386,282 (18.37%)						
Dera Ghazi Khan	807,412 (23.79%)						
Muzaffargarh	946,794 (18.88%)						
Rajanpur	631,223 (26.51%)						
Toba Tek Singh	563,525 (22.33%)						
Jhang	800,926 (26.13%)						
Chiniot	491,672 (31.46%)						
Faisalabad	4,392,979 (48.40%)						
Lahore	13,004,135 (100.00%)						
Kasur	1,243,882 (30.46%)						
Nankana Sahib	323,388 (19.78%)						
Sheikhupura	1,550,793 (38.30%)						
Mianwali	363,453 (20.21%)						
Bhakkar	352,434 (18.00%)						
Talagang	...	...	...	...	...	...	...
Sialkot	1,481,968 (32.94%)						
Gujranwala	3,593,971 (60.30%)	2,949,118 (58.85%)					
Narowal	349,095 (17.89%)	256,657 (15.03%)					
Okara	1,187,504 (33.78%)						
Pakpattan	472,575 (22.12%)						
Sahiwal	757,631 (26.29%)						
Rahim Yar Khan	1,342,252 (24.12%)						
Bahawalnagar	974,118 (27.44%)						
Bahawalpur	1,619,321 (37.79%)						
Sargodha	1,609,587 (37.13%)						
Khushab	418,745 (27.90%)						
Khanewal	716,786 (21.31%)						
Vehari	782,915 (22.82%)						
Multan	2,499,871 (46.62%)						
Lodhran	325,053 (16.86%)						
Mandi Bahauddin	346,141 (18.92%)						
Gujrat	1,324,264 (41.13%)						
Hafizabad	504,380 (38.21%)						
Wazirabad	...						
Islamabad Capital Territory	1,108,872 (46.91%)						
Total	93,884,702 (38.88%)	75,670,837 (36.44%)	43,036,404 (32.52%)	23,841,471 (28.26%)	16,593,651 (25.42%)	9,654,572 (22.52%)	5,985,497 (17.72%)

== See also ==
- Timeline of Karachi
- Timeline of Lahore
- Timeline of Peshawar
- List of most populous cities in Pakistan
