= Banbhore Museum =

Museum in Sindh, Pakistan

- موزه بانبھور
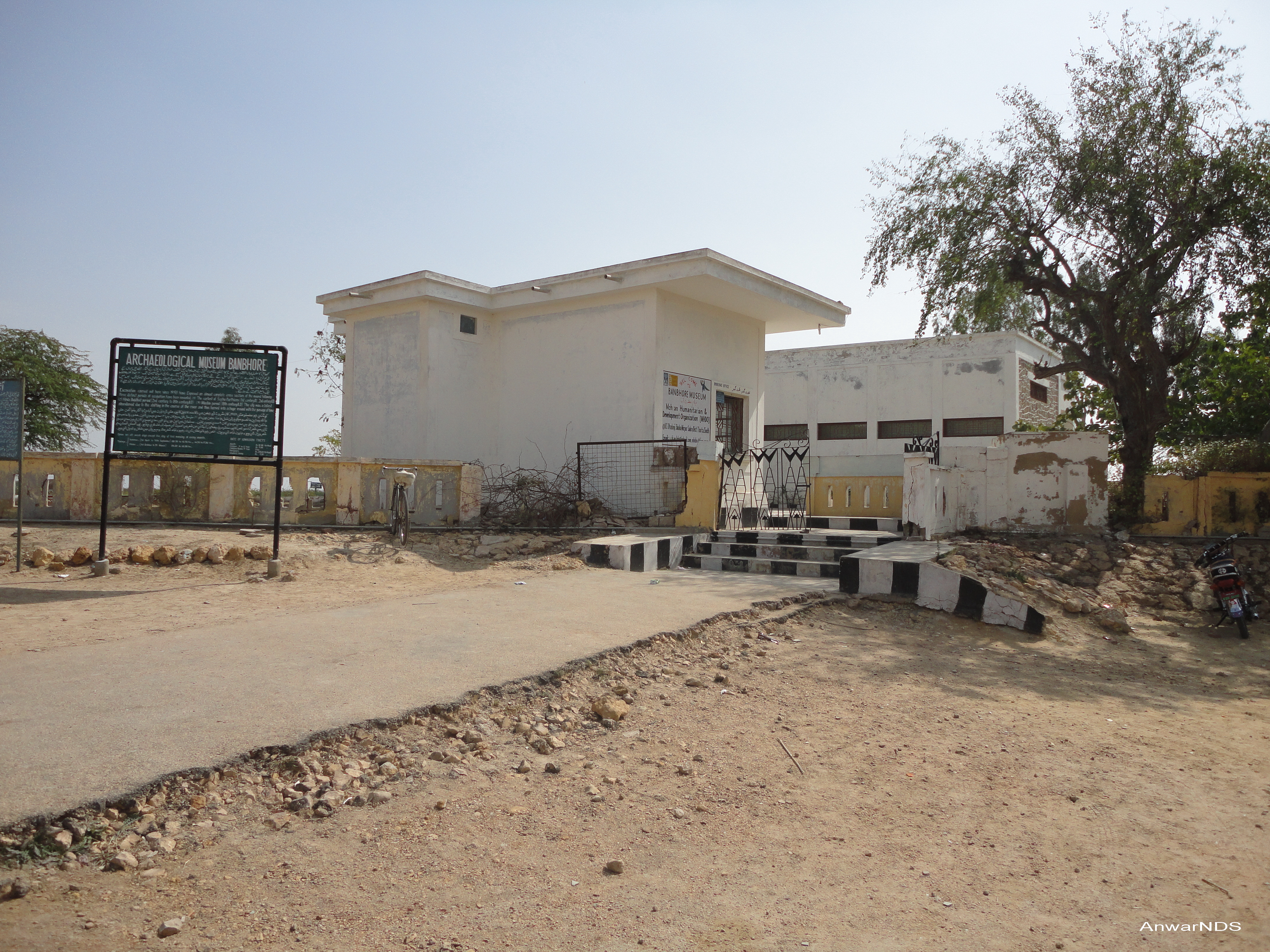
- Banbhore Museum Entrance
- Established: 1960
- Location: Banbhore, Sindh, Pakistan
- Coordinates: 24.7553°N 67.5233°E
- Owner: Government of Sindh
- Website: sindhculture.gov.pk

Banbhore Museum is an archaeological museum located in Banbhore, Sindh, Pakistan. The museum was established by the Department of Archaeology and Museums, Government of Pakistan, on 21 August 1960. The museum was inaugurated on 14 May 1967. In May 2010, management of the site of Banbhore, along with the museum, was transferred to the Culture Department of the Government of Sindh.

== History ==
The site of Banbhore hides large numbers of remains of a settlement.

Banbhore is an ancient archaeological site and the city is more than 2100 years old. It is located 64 km (40 mi) from Karachi in Hyderabad District. It was the capital of chief Bamboo Raja around the 10th century and was named after him. In most historical books, Banbhore is named and recognized as Debal, which is accepted by some historians, scholars, and archaeologists. This city is also a known landmark of Islam because Islam entered into the subcontinent from the city of Banbhore. Preliminary excavation was started by Majumdar in 1928 and in 1951 by Alcock.

== See also ==
- List of museums in Pakistan
