= Kolachi (port) =

Former port located at modern Karachi, Pakistan

Kolachi (Urdu: کولاچی) was also a port located at modern Karachi and the old name of Karachi, Sindh, Pakistan. According to legends, it was a port developed when an old fisherwoman by the name of Mai Kolachi settled near the delta of the Indus River to start a community. One of the main Flyover (overpass) in Karachi has been named after Mai Kolachi. This settlement was also known as "Kolachi jo Goth" or "the village of the Kolachi".

== See also ==
- Dubai
- Kulachi (tribe)
- Kolachi jo Goth
- Krokola
- Debal
- Bhambore
