= Kalachi, Kazakhstan =

Kalachi Кaлaчи
- Town
- Location within Kazakhstan
- Coordinates: 52°14′50″N 66°31′43″E
- Country: Kazakhstan
- Region: Akmola Region

Population (2014)
  - Total: 680

Kalachi (Kazakh: Кaлaчи, Kalachi), previously Kalachevskiy, is a rural locality in Esil District of Akmola Region, Kazakhstan. Prior to the evacuation, It had around 810 people.

== Sleeping Epidemic ==
Since March 2013, the "illness" had spread to around 140 people.

In 2014, it was reported that almost a fifth of the population had been affected with a 'sleep syndrome'. In January 2015, reports said that over half of the village's population planned to move elsewhere. It was later determined that increased carbon monoxide levels from a nearby abandoned mine had caused oxygen levels in the town to fall.
