= Sleeping sickness of Kalachi, Kazakhstan =

- Specialty: Psychiatry/sleep medicine

The sleeping sickness of Kalachi, Kazakhstan (with the place or the syndrome sometimes called sleepy hollow) is a conjectured medical condition which causes a person to sleep for days or weeks at a time, together with other symptoms such as hallucinations, nausea, intoxicated behavior, disorientation and memory loss. The phenomenon was only reported in Kalachi and the nearby village of Krasnogorsk. It was first reported in March 2013 and by 2016 had affected about 150 people. The syndrome appeared to be non-communicable. The disease disappeared for some time but re-emerged in 2015, and affected all age groups.

Potential causes of the syndrome were suggested to be carbon monoxide poisoning or contamination of the ground water supply by chemicals used for military operations in the region.

== Signs and symptoms ==
Other than excessive sleep, the disease causes hallucination, nausea and vomiting, and disorientation. Victims of the disease would sometimes act as if they were drunk, would experience memory loss about what they had done and experienced, and would often experience hallucinations like a "snail walking over their face". In a statement, a professor from Tomsk Polytechnic University, Leonid Rikhvanov, of the department of geo-ecology and geo-chemistry, said that radon gas from the mine could be the cause of the symptoms.

The affected people would fall asleep during day-to-day activities and always feel sleepy. As a local nurse described the phenomenon to an RT news crew, "You wake them up, they can speak to you, reply to you, but as soon as you stop talking and ask what bothers them, they just want to sleep, sleep, sleep."

== Cause ==
Kazakh officials gave a report about the disease, stating that heightened levels of carbon monoxide, along with other hydrocarbons due to flooding of an abandoned Soviet-era uranium mine nearby, was causing the syndrome, by spreading through the village's air. Concentration of carbon monoxide and reduced oxygen in the air were concluded to be the reason for the sleeping sickness in these villages.

An alternate theory was presented by an epidemiologist and experts from Nazarbayev University in Astana, Kazakhstan, after interviewing the local villagers, suggesting the ailment was caused by chemical contamination of the ground water supply. It was suggested that such chemicals had originated from use by the military and had leaked from barrels, but no particular chemicals were reported to have been identified – it was simply suggested that this was a theory worthy of further investigation, based on epidemiology rather than chemical analysis.
