= Allahdino =

- Geographical range: Karachi
- Period: Harappan period
- Dates: c. 2000 BCE

Allahdino is a small village belonging to the Harappan period, located 40 kilometres (25 mi) east of Karachi. It is an unfortified settlement of 1.4 hectares, established in a coastal area of Pakistan. This small but well-organised settlement was abandoned by c. 2000 BCE.

== Excavations ==
Several mud-brick houses, sometimes built on stone platforms were excavated from this site. A large multiroomed house with a mudbrick platform was also excavated. One building had three wells, with diameters of 60 cm to 90 cm. In fact, all the wells found on this site had similarly small diameters. The layout of the settlement and buildings suggest that Allahdino was involved with administrative role.

== Artifacts found ==
Large quantities of copper objects, triangular terracotta cakes, seals, small terracotta jars with profusions of gold, silver, bronze and other ornaments were found. Several jars, one containing gold and silver ornaments, were also found here. A belt containing 36 carnelian beads was found, proof of highly skilled workers being settled in the area. Archeologists believe that findings of gold and silver ornaments, as well as the usage of stone at the village indicate some of the residents were well to do. This site is well excavated one and a total of 240,000 vessels and shreds were collected and tabulated.

== Importance ==
Water from the wells of Allahdino would have been used to irrigate nearby fields. Allahdino is also thought to have been associated with textile manufacturing.
