= Barbarikon =

Former name of a sea port near the modern-day city of Karachi, Sindh, Pakistan

Barbarikon (Ancient Greek: Βαρβαρικόν) was the name of a sea port near the modern-day city of Karachi, Sindh, Pakistan, important in the ancient era of the Indian subcontinent in Indian Ocean trade. The port is considered one of the premiere ports regarding the interaction between ancient India with the Middle East and Mediterranean world. It comes from the Greek word of the term (also in Latin, barbaricum), designating areas outside the Greco-Roman world.

It may have been a translation from Sumerian word Meluhha for the Sindh from which the Sanskrit word for barbarian, Mleccha derives.

Barbarikon as mentioned in Periplus of the Erythraean Sea

Barbarikon is mentioned briefly in the Periplus of the Erythraean Sea:

"This river [the Indus] has seven mouths, very shallow and marshy, so that they are not navigable, except the one in the middle; at which by the shore, is the market-town, Barbaricum. Before it there lies a small island, and inland behind it is the metropolis of Scythia, Minnagara; it is subject to Parthian princes who are constantly driving each other out."

"The ships lie at anchor at Barbaricum, but all their cargoes are carried up to the metropolis by the river, to the King. There are imported into this market a great deal of thin clothing, and a little spurious; figured linens, topaz, coral, storax, frankincense, vessels of glass, silver and gold plate, and a little wine. On the other hand there are exported costus, bdellium, lycium, nard, turquoise, lapis lazuli, Seric skins, cotton cloth, silk yarn, and indigo. And sailors set out thither with the Indian Etesian winds, about the, month of July, that is Epiphi: it is more dangerous then, but through these winds the voyage is more direct, and sooner completed."

Its principal function beyond supplying its immediate hinterland was as a transshipment port for supplies of Persian turquoise and Afghan lapis lazuli, to be carried overland to Egypt.

== See also ==
- Periplus of the Erythraean Sea
- Regio Patalis
- Banbhore
