= Mai Kolachi =

Sindhi folk legend

Mai Kolachi (b. 11th century) according to local legend, was a fisherwoman who settled near the delta of the Indus River in the oldest area of Karachi to start a community. The village was named after her for her bravery, who jumped into the sea to save her son. Kolachi and this community was later developed into the modern city of Karachi, Sindh, Pakistan.

== History ==
"The Moriro Mirbahar and the Mangarmachh" is an ancient Sindhi folktale about a fisherwoman named Mai Kolachi and her sons. It was originally written by the famous Sindhi sufi poet Hazrat Shah Abdul Latif Bhittai. There are many different variations of the story, but most say that it took place during the 11th century during the rule of the Soomra dynasty.

== The Legend ==
There was a small fishing village in old Karachi, where a woman named Mai Kolachi lived with her seven sons, the youngest was Moriro who was handicapped and could not walk properly. The other children were healthy went fishing in the sea every morning, but Moriro always stayed at home with his mother. He also wanted to go fishing with his brothers but because he was handicapped his brothers didn't take him along.

One morning when the brothers were preparing to go out to work, the weather became extreme and dangerous, and the waves were high as they crashed against the shore. But it was their livelihood, thus they had to go fish, otherwise they would starve. As they braved the water, their ship began rising along with the unruly waves as the weather worsened. Thus, all their focus was on trying to keep the small vessel from capsizing, and they did not notice a huge crocodile which had suddenly rose out of the water. With its powerful jaw, it attacked the fishing boat which immediately broke and began to sink. The young fishermen could not save themselves and were eaten by the crocodile.

Mai Kolachi and Moriro waited for days, but the boys didn't return. The fishing community of the village were convinced that the boys had been killed by the monster Mangarmach (crocodile). But Moriro and his mother did not lose hope, they kept looking for them. One day, they decided to go out to the very same waters Moriro's brothers disappeared in. But how? They were just an old woman and a young handicapped boy! Moriro was aware that if he went into the sea he could also get eaten by the monster. Therefore he thought of building an iron-cage with sharp spikes around it. He tied the cage with sturdy ropes, whose other ends were attached into the necks of two massive bulls. He then locked himself into the cage, with only a sharp dagger in hand and instructed the villagers to throw the iron cage into the sea.

Sitting in the iron cage, Moriro floated into the sea until he reached a part where the monster was known to lurk for its prey. As soon as Moriro approached the monster, it attacked the cage. However, the sharp spikes of the cage impaled the mouth of monster and incapacitated it. Seeing that the monster was helpless and not dangerous anymore, Moriro killed it with his dagger. The carcass of the crocodile along with the cage and Moriro was then pulled out of sea with the help of the bulls and the villagers. Moriro's return was triumphant and everyone applauded his bravery. Once on dry land, he tore open the belly of monster and took out the remains of his brothers and reverently buried them near his village, which is now present day Gulbai chowk in Keamari where their graves are still present. Moriro and his mother Mai Kolachi are buried in the area of present day Boultan market.

== See also ==
- Kulachi (tribe)
