= Banbhore =

Historical site in Pakistan

Bhanbhore
- ڀنڀور (Sindhi)
- Bhambhore; Mithradatkirt
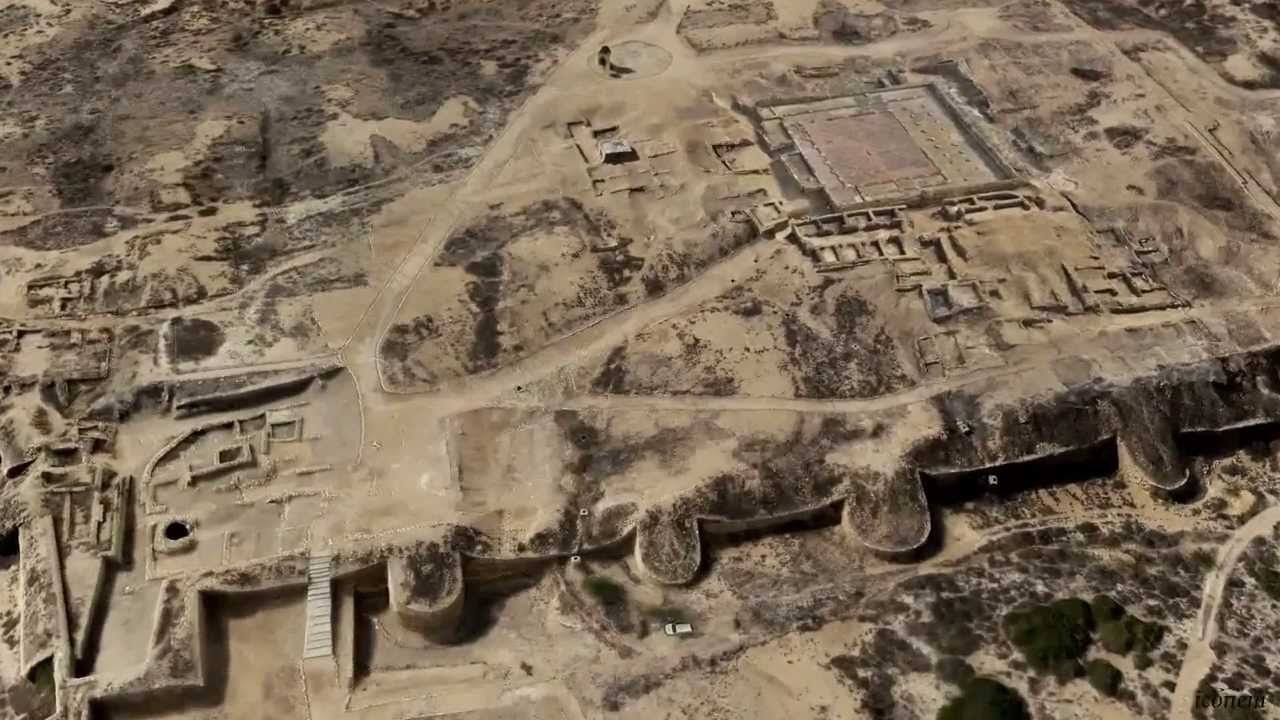
- Aerial view of the Bhanbhore site

- Location within Pakistan
- 24.7514°N 67.5213°E
- Type: Settlement
- Location: Sindh, Pakistan

History
- Built: 1st century BC
- Abandoned: After 13th century AD

Site notes
- Condition: Ruined

Banbhore, Bambhore, Bhanbhore or Bhambhore (Sindhi: ڀنڀور; Urdu: بھنبھور) is a city dating to the 1st century BCE located in modern-day Sindh, Pakistan. The city ruins lie on the N-5 National Highway, east of Karachi. It dates back to the Scytho-Parthian era and was later controlled by Muslims from the 8th to the 13th century, after which it was abandoned. Remains of one of the earliest known mosques in the region dating back to 727 AD are still preserved in the city. In 1958, a major program of excavations at an early Islamic site of Banbhore was launched by the Department of Archaeology under the direction of F. A. Khan which continued until 1964. In 2004, Department of Archaeology and Museums Pakistan submitted the site for UNESCO World Heritage Sites.

== Location ==
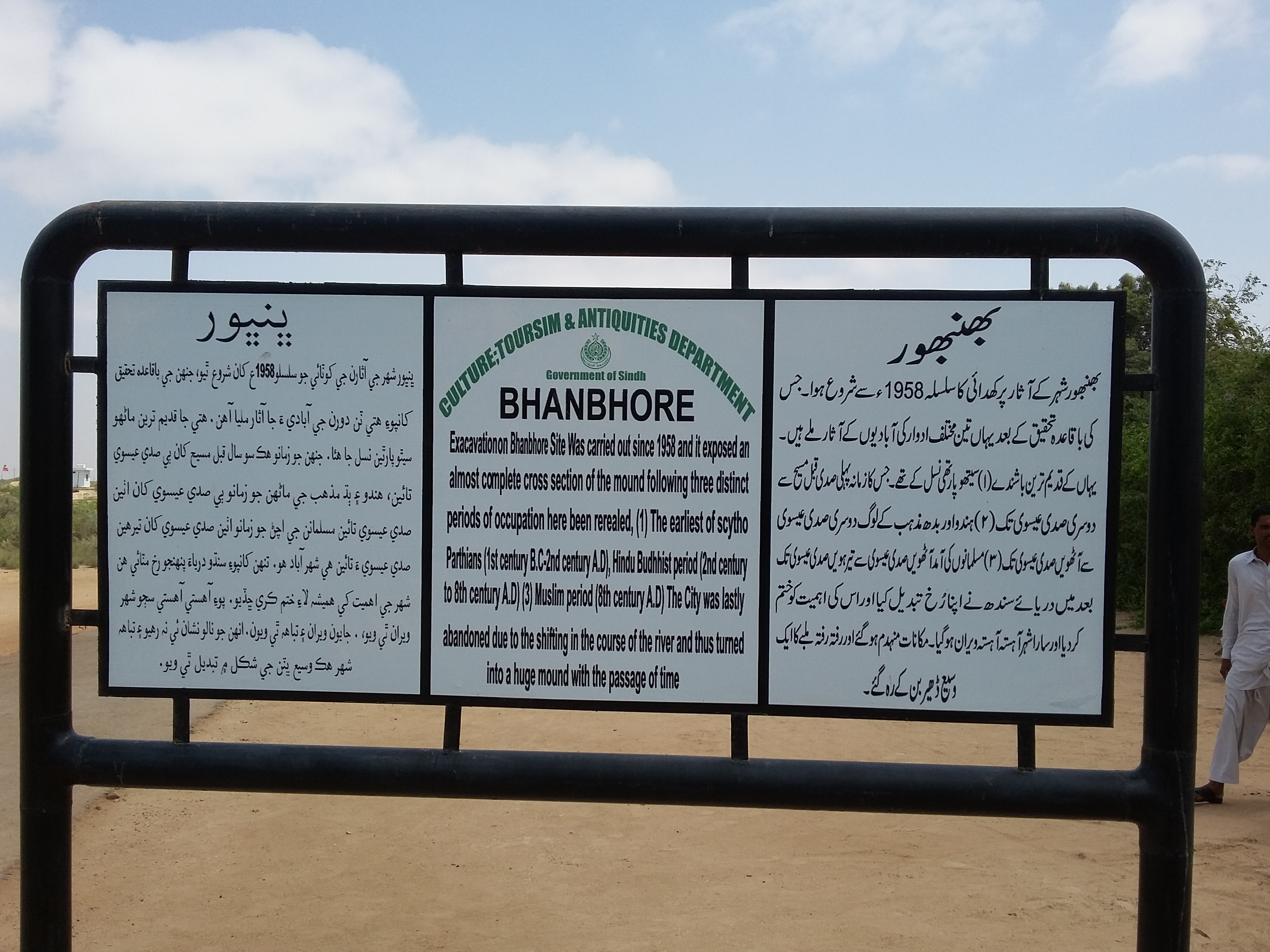
History of Bhanbhore

Bhanbhore is situated on the northern bank of Gharo creek, about 65 kilometres (40 mi) east of Karachi in the Thatta District of Sindh, Pakistan. The city ruins are located on the N-5 National Highway between Dhabeji and Gharo.

== History ==
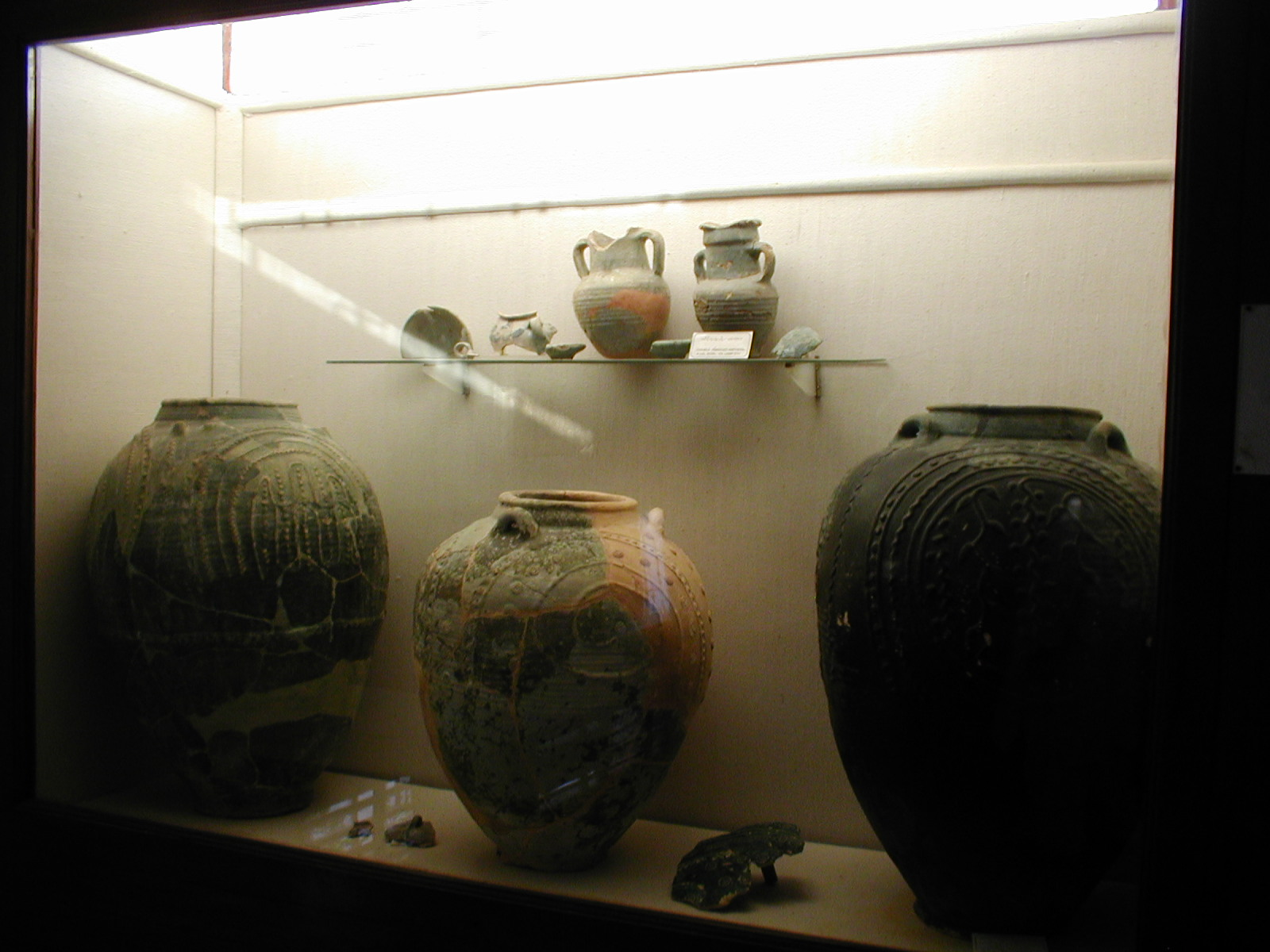
Artifacts discovered from Bhanbhore in Bhanbhore Museum

The city of Bhanbhore dates from the 1st century BC to the 13th century AD. Archaeological records reveal remnants of three distinct periods on the site: Scytho-Parthian (1st century BC to 2nd century AD), Buddhist (2nd century AD to 8th century AD), and early Islamic (8th century AD to 13th century AD). The city was gradually deserted after the 13th century due to change in the course of the Indus.

Some archaeologist and historians suggest that Bhanbhore is the historical city of Debal, which the Arab general Muhammad bin Qasim conquered in 711–712 after defeating Raja Dahir, the last Hindu ruler of Sindh. However, this identification has not yet been confirmed, though numerous research and excavation works have been carried out to link the two cities. Preliminary excavations in the area were first done by Ramesh Chandra Majumdar in 1928 and later by Leslie Alcock in 1951. Pakistani archaeologist Dr F. A. Khan conducted extensive studies and excavations in the site from 1958 to 1965. In March 2012, the Culture Department of Government of Sindh organised the first International Conference on Bhanbhore, where different experts and archaeologists presented their research on the site.

Bhanbhore may also have been known as Barbari or Barbaricon (Βαρβαρικόν) to the Greeks and through the centuries, but it has not yet been proven that these historical cities are the same.

== Ruins ==
Archaeological findings show that the city consisted of an enclosed area surrounded by a stone and mud wall. The citadel was divided into eastern and western sections by a fortified stone wall in the center. The eastern part contains ruins of a mosque with an inscription dating to 727 AD, sixteen years after the conquest of Sindh, indicating the best-preserved example of the earliest mosques in the region. The remains of the mosque were discovered in 1960. Remains of houses, streets, and other buildings have been found both within and outside the citadel. Contemporary stone buildings from the three periods are also uncovered in the area including a palatial stone building with semi-circular shape, a temple, possibly from the Buddhist period or earlier, and a mosque. Three gateways to the citadel were also uncovered during excavations.

== Bhanbhore Port ==
Bhanbhore was a medieval port city deriving its wealth from imported ceramic and metal goods, an industrial sector, and trade. The city was strategically located at the mouth of the Indus, linking it with rest of the Indo-Scythians and Indo-Parthians and international traders in the Indian Ocean. Archaeological findings show a half-submerged anchorage structure with solid stone foundation, which may have been used for berthing cargo boats. However, the port was abandoned when the Indus river shifted its position and the creek was silted.

== World Heritage Site ==
The Port of Bhanbhore was submitted for induction in World Heritage Sites by the Department of Archaeology and Museums of Pakistan in January 2004. It is currently in the tentative list under the criteria iv, v, and vi of the cultural category.

== Gallery ==
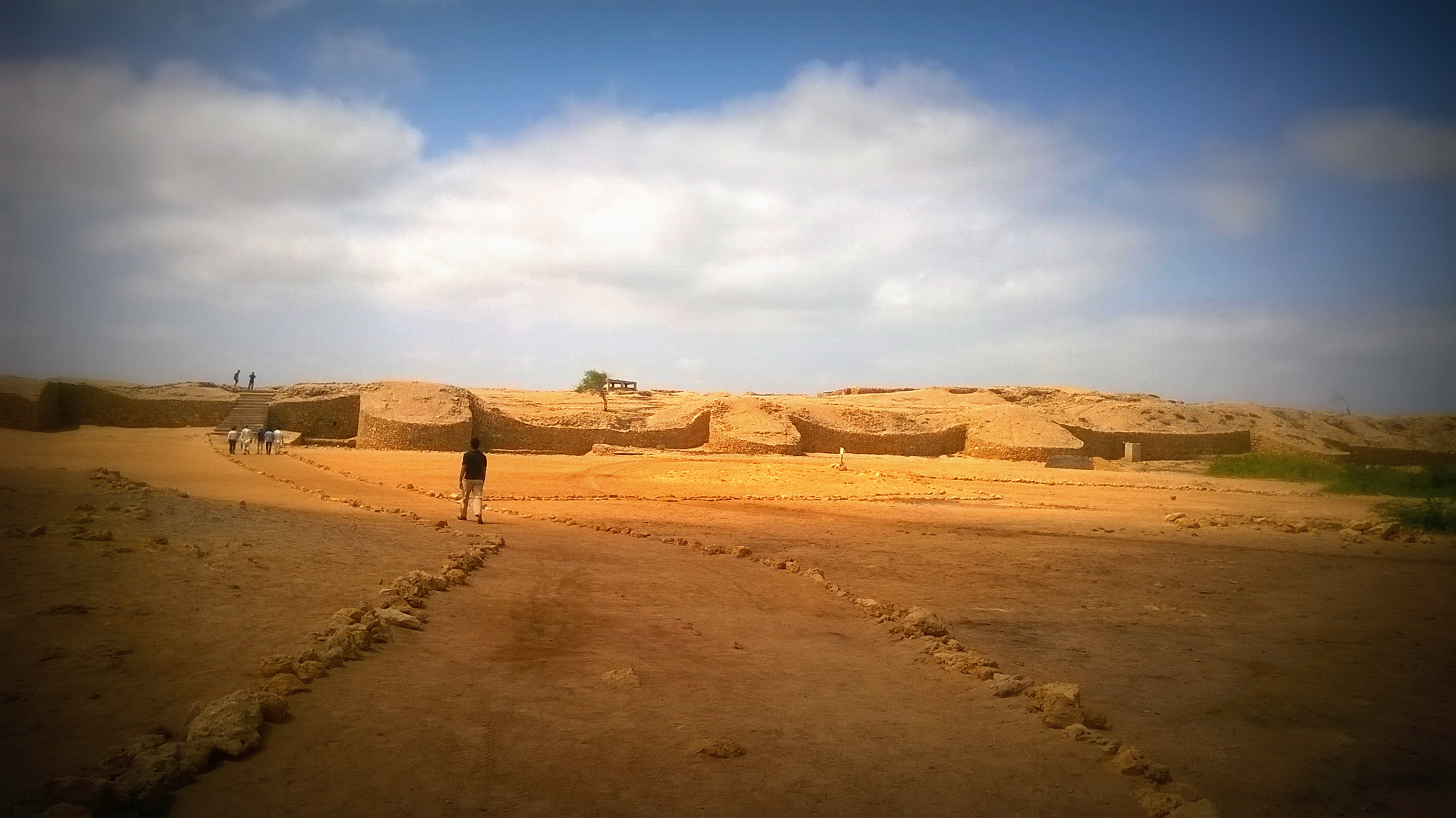
North wall of Bhanbhore Fort

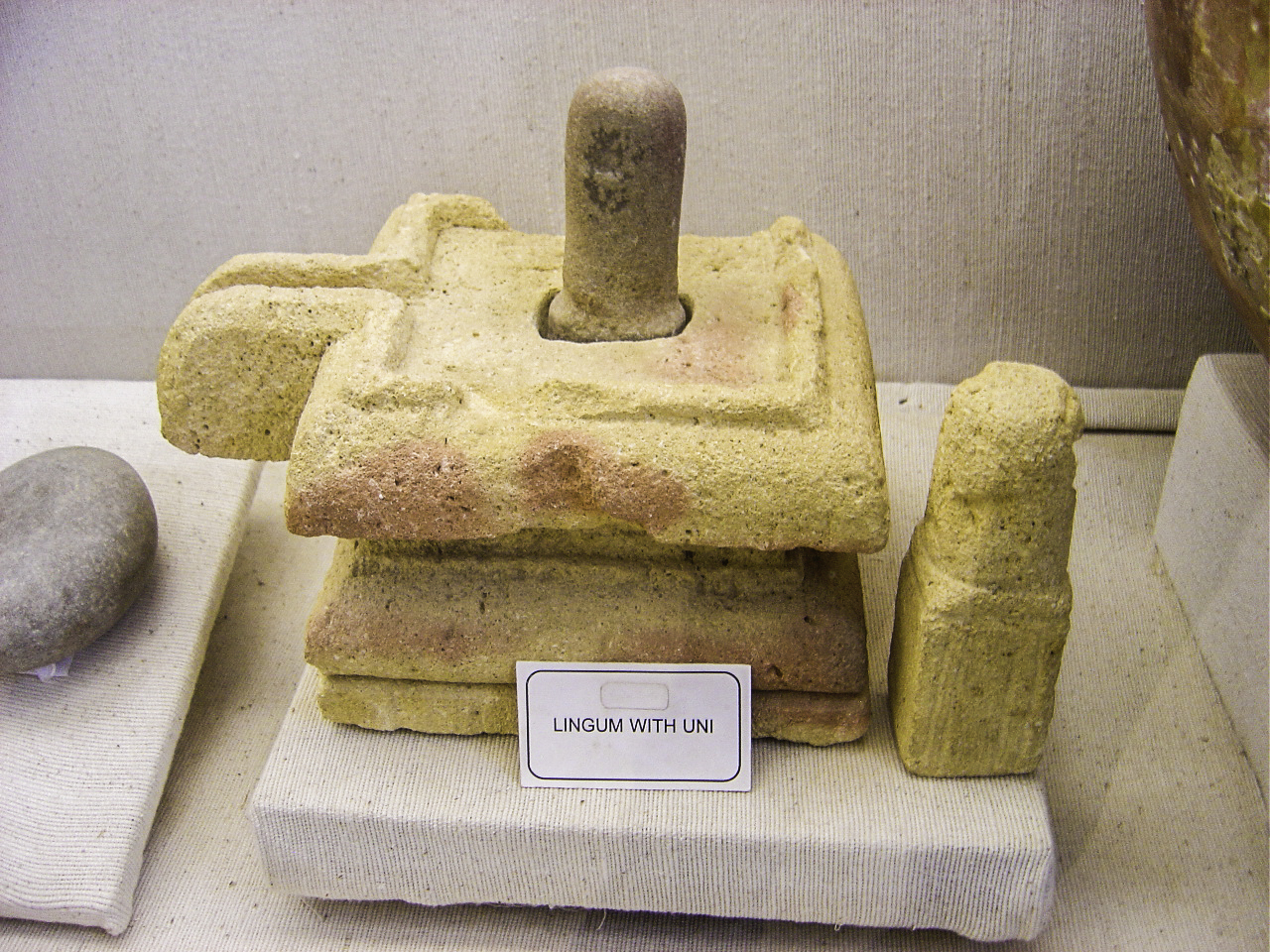
Banbhore Museum: excavated Shiva Linga

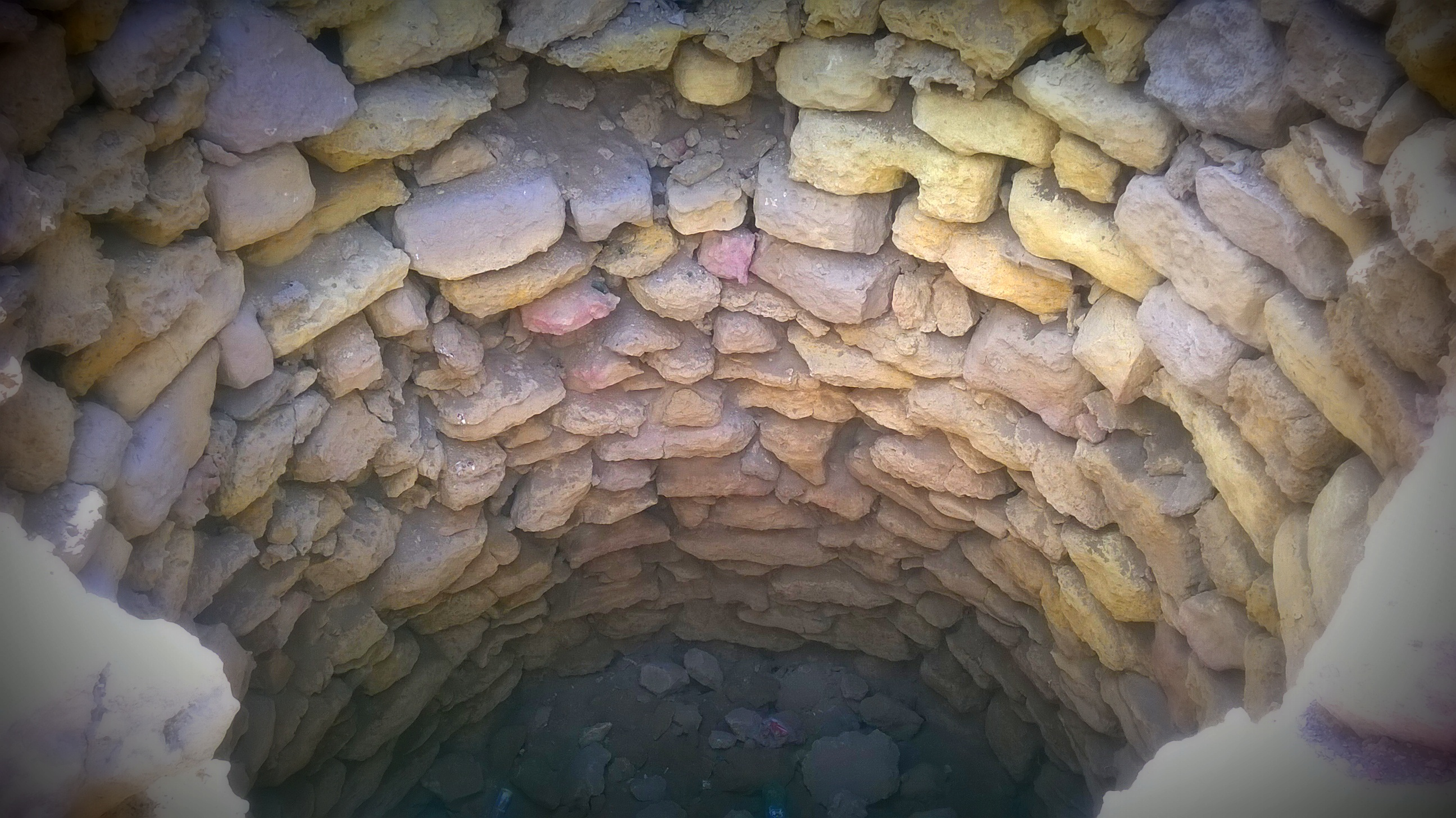
An old well in Bhanbhore Fort

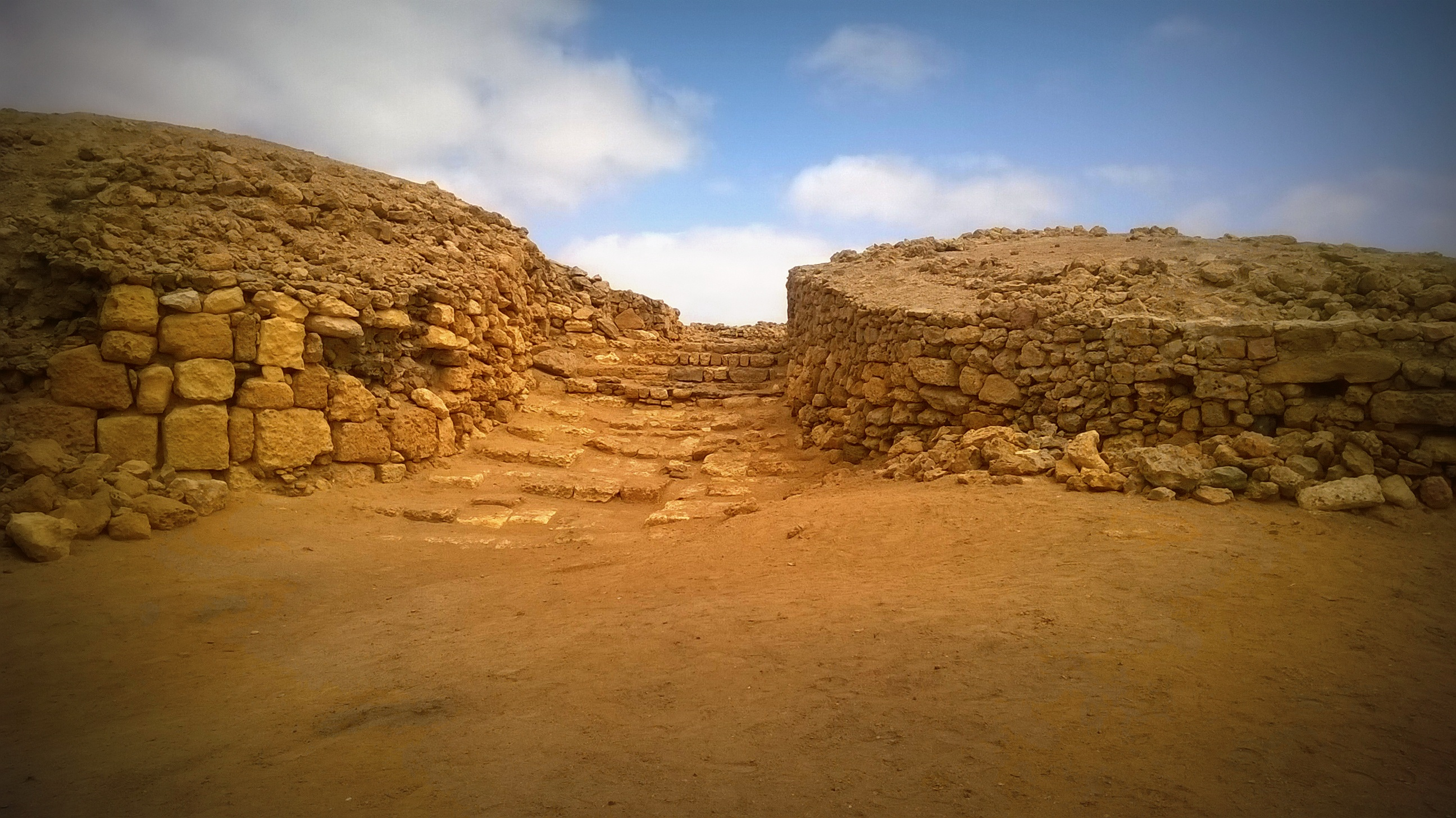
South Gate of Bhanbore Fort, where the Muhammad bin Qasim entered the Fort

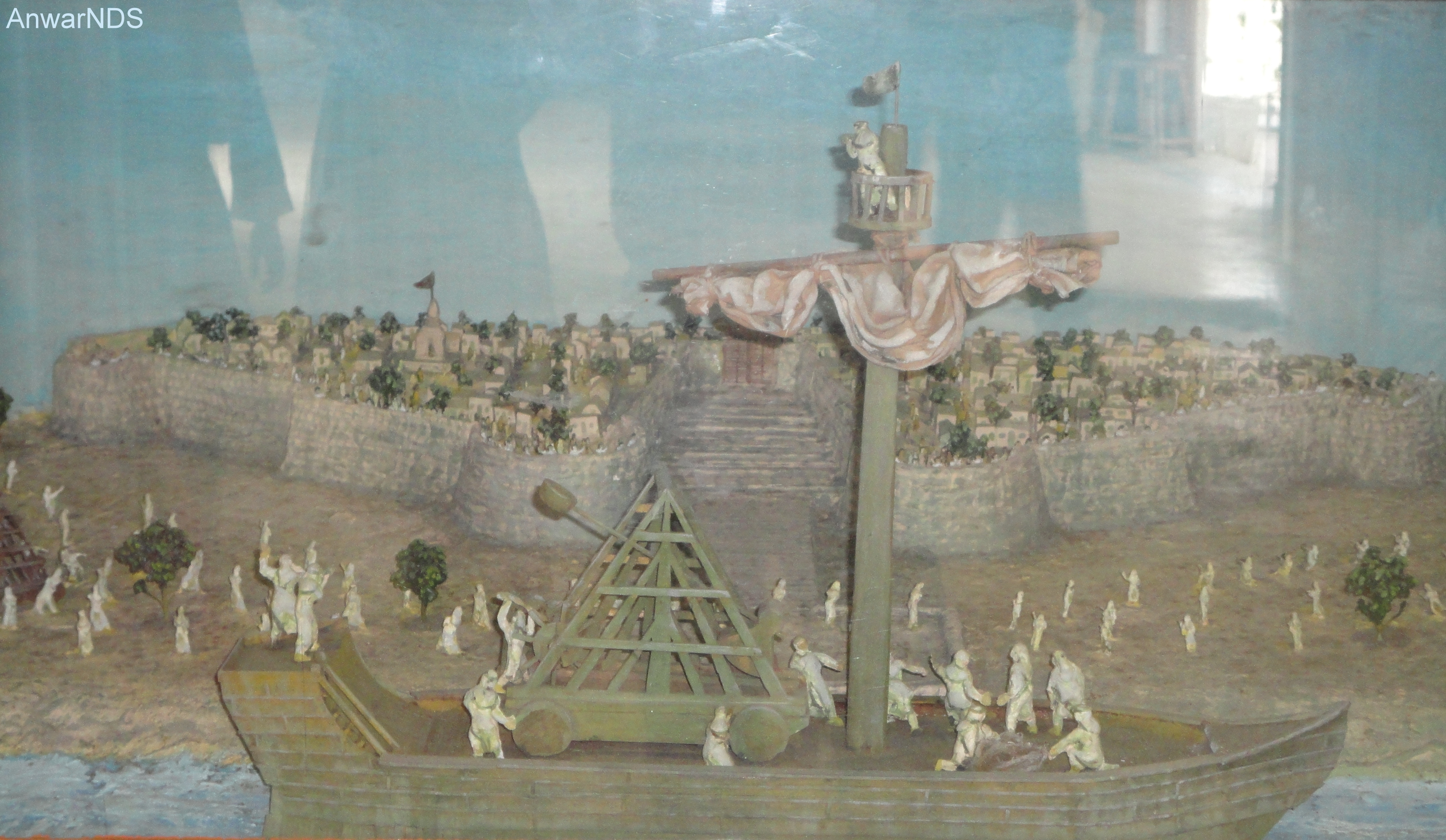
Banbhore Museum: seize of Bhanbore Fort by Muhammad bin Qasim

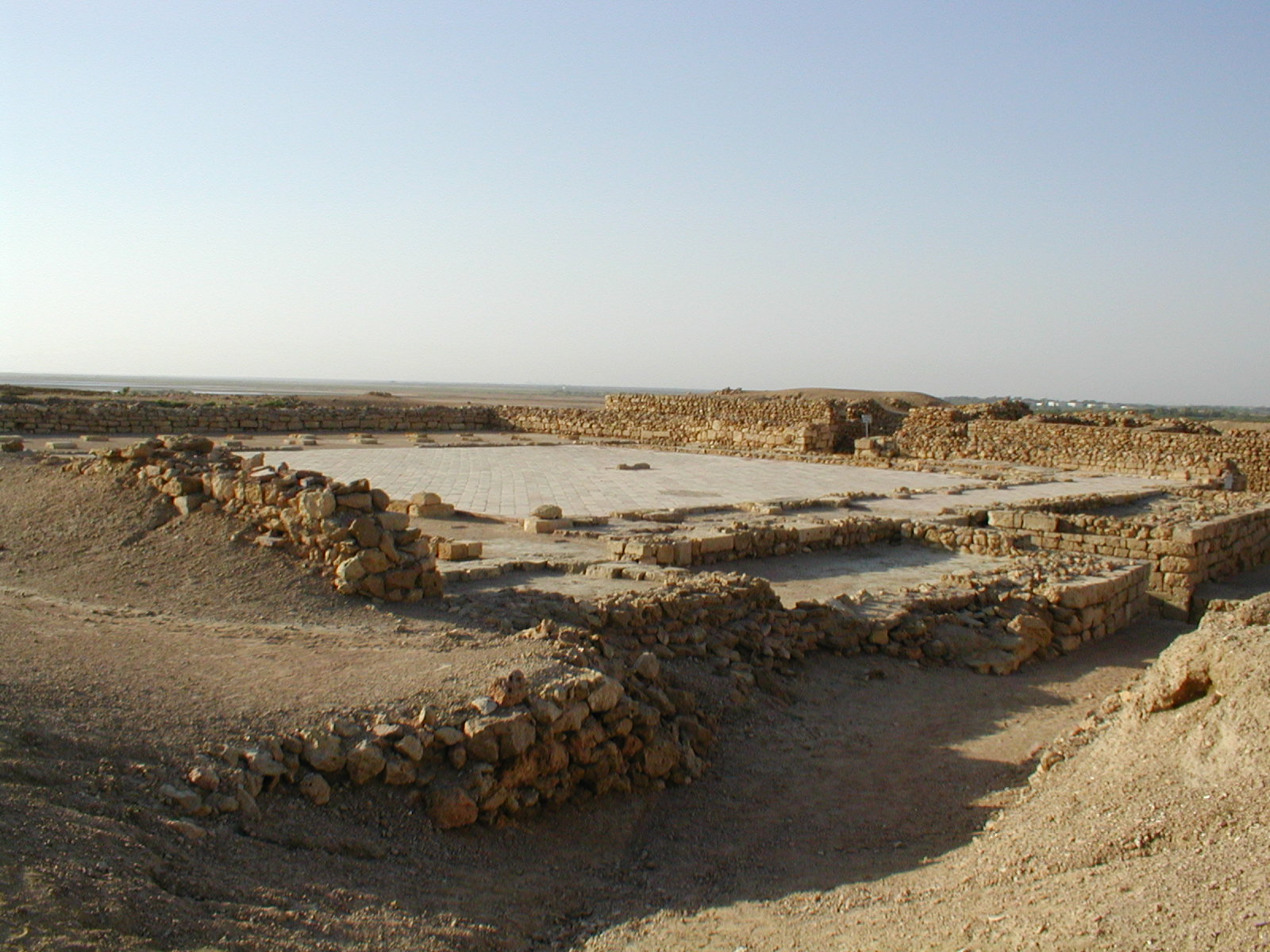
Floor of the Bhanbhore Mosque, dating back 727 AD

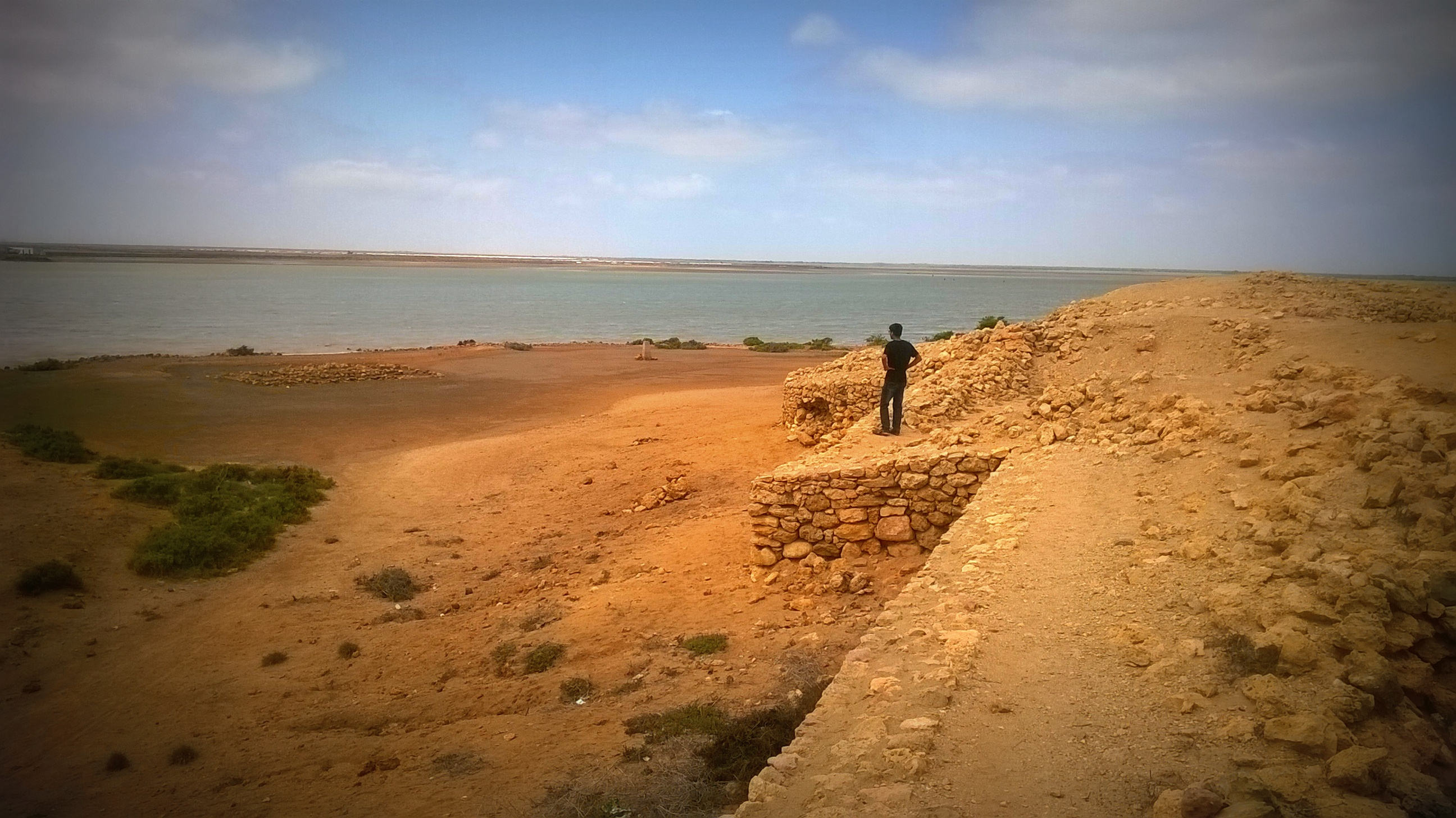
South wall of Bhanbhore Fort

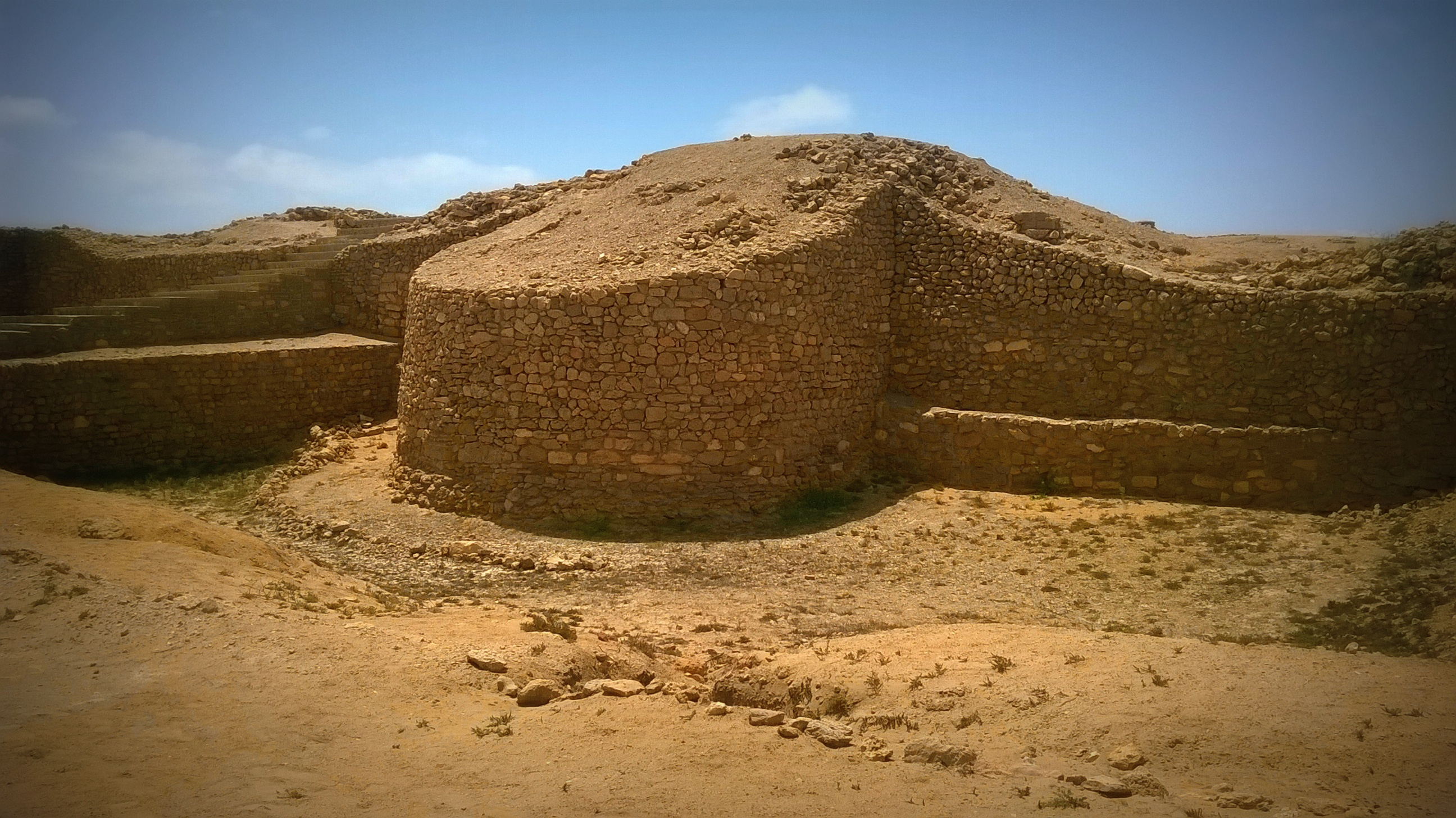
Tower of North wall

== See also ==
- Archaeological Museum Banbhore
- List of UNESCO World Heritage Sites in Pakistan
- Barbarikon
- Debal
