= Kulachi (tribe) =

Baloch tribe

Kulachi or Kolachi (Balochi: کولاچی) is a Baloch and Brahui tribe with Dodai Rajput origins from Sindh. The tribe got its name from the Kolach or Kolanch area of Makran. The city of Karachi in Sindh may have derived its name from this tribe.
