= Liaqat =

Liaqat may refer to:

- Agha Syed Liaqat Ali, Pakistani politician, member of the Provincial Assembly of Balochistan 2013–2018
- Chaudhry Liaqat Ali, Pakistani politician, member of the Provincial Assembly of the Punjab since 2018
- Liaqat Ali (1895–1951), the first Prime Minister of Pakistan
- Liaqat Ali (cricketer, born 1955) (born 1955), Pakistani cricketer
- Rana Liaqat Ali, Pakistani politician, Member of the Provincial Assembly of the Punjab since 2018
- Liaqat Baloch (born 1952), political leader in Pakistan
- Liaqat Ali Bangulzai, Pakistani politician
- Liaqat Abbas Bhatti, Pakistani politician
- Iffat Liaqat Ali Khan, Pakistani politician in the Provincial Assembly of Punjab
- Liaqat Ali Khan (Pakistani politician), Pakistani politician, member of the Provincial Assembly of Khyber Pakhtunkhwa since 2018
- Liaqat Ali Khan (politician), Pakistani politician, member of the National Assembly of Pakistan 2008–2013
- Liaqat Hayat Khan KCIE OBE (1887–1948), Indian official, Prime Minister of Patiala State, in British India
- Iffat Liaqat, Pakistani politician, member of the National Assembly of Pakistan 2013–2018
- Mohammed Liaqat, one of the leaders of a child sex abuse ring that sexually abused up to a hundred girls in Derby, England
- Sajid Liaqat (born 1985), German cricketer
- Hafiz Liaqat Manzoor, citizen of Pakistan who was held in the Guantanamo Bay detention camps in Cuba
- Liaqat Khan Tarakai, Pakistani politician, member of Senate of Pakistan representing Pakistan Tehreek-e-Insaf

== See also ==
- Liaqat Ali (disambiguation)
- Liaqat National Bagh, famous park on Murree Road in the city of Rawalpindi, Punjab, Pakistan
- Tolombeh-ye Mohandas Liaqat, village in Mohammadabad Rural District, Marvdasht County, Fars Province, Iran
- Liaqat Pur, city and capital of Liaqatpur Tehsil in Rahim Yar Khan District, Punjab, Pakistan
- Liaquat (disambiguation)
