= Iffat (disambiguation) =

Iffat bint Mohammad Al Thunayan (1916–2000) was a Saudi women's education activist.

Iffat or Effat may also refer to:

== People ==
=== Given name ===
- Efat Ghazi (1935–1990), Kurdish refugee from Iran who was killed by a letter bomb
- Effat Marashi (born 1935), widow of former Iranian president
- Effat Moridi (1929–2013), Iranian activist for mass execution victims
- Effat Nagy (1905–1994), Egyptian artist
- Effat Nssar (born 1964), Egyptian footballer and coach
- Effat Shariati (born 1952), Iranian politician
- Effat Tejaratchi (1917–1999), first Iranian female aviator
- Iffat Ara (born 1939), Bangladeshi writer, social activist, and literary organizer
- Iffat Miraj Awan (born 1971), Pakistani politician
- Iffat-un-Nissa Begum, Mughal princess
- Iffat Ara Dewan, Bangladeshi singer and painter
- Iffat Liaqat, Pakistani politician
- Iffat Liaqat Ali Khan, Pakistani politician
- Iffat Rahim (born 1975), Pakistani actress and model

=== Surname ===
- Emad Effat (1959–2011), Egyptian Sunni Islamic cleric who was killed in a protest

== Places ==
- Effat University, private school in Jeddah, Saudi Arabia
