= Demographics of Karachi =

Pakistani municipal demographics

Trend of population growth (in millions) in Karachi.

Karachi is the largest and most populous city in Pakistan. The population and demographic distribution in the megacity has undergone numerous changes over the past 150 years. On 14 August 1947, when it became the capital city of Pakistan, its population was about 450,000 inhabitants However, the population rapidly grew with large influx of Muslim refugees after independence in 1947. By 1951, the city population had crossed one million mark. in the following decade, the rate of growth of Karachi was over 80 percent. Today, the city has grown 60 times its size in 1947 when it became the country's first capital. Although, Islamabad remains the nation's capital since the 1960s, the city's population continues to grow at about 5% per annum, largely thanks to its strong economic base.

A person from Karachi is known as a Karachiite.

== Migration ==
Whereas most megacities in the developing world have grown out of rural-urban migration from the countryside not too distant from them, Karachi's demographics are the largely contributed by long-distance immigration. Before the independence of Pakistan, Karachi already had a diverse mix of religions and ethnic groups. After the independence, most of the Urdu speaking Muslim refugees of the partition of India settled in Karachi. Likewise, a large number of Hindus left the city in 1947 due to Hindu-Muslim riots and settled in India. Predominantly Urdu speaking Muslim refugees known as Muhajirs formed the dominant ethnic group in Karachi. Muhajirs originated from different parts of India and brought with them their local cultures and cuisines, thus further adding to the already diverse mix of people that earlier inhabited Karachi. Currently, these older groups of people and continuing migration from different parts of Pakistan have contributed to a rich and diverse mix of people that live in Karachi. This has further been diversified with migration from other non-traditional countries such as by Arabs, people from different Middle Eastern countries, as well as Afghans and more recently Central Asians and Uighurs. This has given the city a very metropolitan character, and has earned it the title as the melting pot of Pakistan.

== Demographic history of Karachi ==
Historical population
Year	Pop.	±% p.a.
1856	56,875	—
1872	56,753	−0.01%
1881	73,560	+2.92%
1891	105,199	+3.64%
1901	136,297	+2.62%
1911	186,771	+3.20%
1921	244,162	+2.72%
1931	300,799	+2.11%
1941	435,887	+3.78%
1951	1,068,459	+9.38%
1961	1,912,598	+6.00%
1972	3,426,310	+5.44%
1981	5,208,132	+4.76%
1998	9,269,265	+3.45%
2017	14,910,352	+2.53%

Karachi's inhabitants, locally known as Karachiites, are composed of ethno-linguistic groups from all parts of Pakistan, as well as migrants from South Asia, making the city's population a diverse melting pot. At the end of the 19th century, the population of the city was about 105,000, with a gradual increase over the next few decades, reaching more than 400,000 on the eve of independence. Estimates of the population range from 15 to 18 million, of which an estimated 90% are migrants from different backgrounds, particularly Muhajirs (Indian-origin), Bengali (Bangladeshi-origin) and Afghans. The city's population is estimated to be growing at about 5% per year (mainly as a result of internal rural-urban migration), including an estimated 45,000 migrant workers coming to the city every month from different parts of Pakistan.

The earliest inhabitants of the area that became Karachi were Sindhi tribes such as the Jokhio, Mallaah and Jat in the east and Baloch in the west and. Before the end of British colonial rule and the subsequent independence of Pakistan in 1947, the population of the city was majority Sindhi and Baloch Muslims, Hindus and Sikhs community numbering around 250,000 residents. The city was, and still is home to a large community of Gujarati Muslims who were one of the earliest settlers in the city, and still form the majority in Saddar Town. Important Gujarati Muslim communities in the city include the Memon, Chhipa, Ghanchi, Khoja, Bohra and Tai. Other early settlers included the Marwari Muslims, Parsis originally from Iran, Marathi Muslims and Konkani Muslims from Maharashtra (settled in Kokan Town), Goan Catholics and Anglo-Indians. Most Hindus and Sikhs migrated to India after independence of Pakistan. There are still small communities of Parsis, Goan Catholics and Anglo-Indians in the city.

After the independence of Pakistan large numbers of Indian Muslims, mainly Urdu-speaking people, migrated to Karachi. There is also a sizeable community of Marathi Muslims and Malayali Muslims in Karachi (the Mappila), originally from Kerala in South India. The Marathi and Malayali Muslims in Karachi have intermarried with the other Muslims especially with Memon and Urdu-speaking Muslims and now have integrated into the wider Urdu-speaking Muhajir community. Since last few decades population of the Sindhis are also increasing dramatically.

The Pashtuns, originally from Khyber Pakhtunkhwa, Afghanistan, the Federally Administered Tribal Areas and northern Balochistan, are now the city's second largest ethnic group after Muhajirs, these Pashtuns are settled in Karachi from decades. With as high as 7 million by some estimates the city of Karachi in Pakistan has the largest concentration of urban Pakhtun population in the world, including 50,000 registered Afghan refugees in the city, meaning there are more Pashtuns in Karachi than in any other city in the world. However, according to the census 2017 of the Pakistan, the total population of the Pashtuns in Sindh is approximately 2.5 million (5% of the total sindh) and it will make around 10-13 percent of the Pashtoons living in Karachi's population.

== Districts Population Density per Sq.km. ==
According to 2023 Census, with 55,396.01 residents per square kilometre Karachi Central is the most densely populated district of the six districts of Karachi as well as the entirety of Pakistan.

Rank	District	Population (2023 census)	Population (2017 census)	Area (Sq. km.)	Density (2023)	Density (2017)
1	Central	3,822,325	2,971,382	69	55,396.01	43,063.51
2	Korangi	3,128,971	2,577,556	108	28,971.95	23,866.26
3	East	3,921,742	2,875,315	139	28,213.97	20,685.72
4	South	2,329,764	1,769,230	122	19,096.43	14,501.89
5	West	2,679,380	2,077,228	370	7,241.57	5,614.13
6	Kemari	2,068,451	1,829,837	559	3,700.27	3,273.41
7	Malir	2,432,248	1,924,364	2,160	1,126.04	890.90
	All	20,357,474	16,024,894	3,527	5,771.90	4,543.49

== Ethnic groups ==
=== Language ===
1. Urdu (50.6%)
2. Pashto (13.5%)
3. Sindhi (11.1%)
4. Punjabi (8.08%)
5. Saraiki (3.70%)
6. Balochi (3.97%)
7. Others (8.93%)

Karachi has the largest number of Urdu speakers (Muhajirs). As per the 2023 census, the linguistic breakdown of Karachi Division is:

Language	Rank	2023 census	Speakers	2017 census	Speakers	1998 census	Speakers	1981 census	Speakers
Urdu	1	50.60%	10,315,905	42.30%	6,779,142	48.52%	4,497,747	54.34%	2,830,098
Pashto	2	13.52%	2,752,148	15.01%	2,406,011	11.42%	1,058,650	8.71%	453,628
Sindhi	3	11.12%	2,264,189	10.67%	1,709,877	7.22%	669,340	6.29%	327,591
Punjabi	4	8.08%	1,645,282	10.73%	1,719,636	13.94%	1,292,335	13.64%	710,389
Saraiki	5	3.70%	753,903	4.98%	798,031	2.11%	195,681	0.35%	18,228
Balochi	6	3.97%	808,352	4.04%	648,964	4.34%	402,386	4.39%	228,636
Others	7	8.93%	1,817,695	12.25%	1,963,233	12.44%	1,153,126	12.27%	639,560
All		100%	20,357,474	100%	16,024,894	100%	9,269,265	100%	5,208,132

The category of "others" includes Hindko, Kashmiri, Kohistani, Burushaski, Gujarati, Memoni, Marwari, Dari, Brahui, Makrani, Khowar, Gilgiti, Balti, Arabic, Farsi, and Bengali.

The ethnic groups in Karachi include members from all ethnic groups in Pakistan, making the city's population a diverse melting pot. At the end of the 19th century, the population of the city was about 105,000, with a gradual increase over the next few decades, reaching more than 400,000 on the eve of independence. Estimates of the population are approximately 23,000,000, of which an estimated 90% are migrants from different backgrounds. The city's population is estimated to be growing at about 5% per year (mainly as a result of internal rural-urban migration), including an estimated 45,000 migrant workers coming to the city every month from different parts of Pakistan. According to the community leaders and social scientists there are over 1.6 million Bengalis and up to 400,000 Rohingyas living in Karachi.

== Religion ==
According to a 2023 census of Pakistan, the religious breakdown of the city is as follows:Muslim (96.52%), Christian (2.14%), Hindu (1.17%), and other (0.17%). Other religious groups include Sikhs, Buddhists, Parsis, Baháʼís, Ahmedis and Jews. Of the Muslims, approximately 73% are Sunnis and 27% are Shi'ites.

Religious groups in Karachi City
	% (1941)	% (1951)	% (1998)
Muslim	42.3%	96.1%	96.5%
Hindu	51.1%	1.7%	0.9%
Christian	2.3%	1.6%	2.4%
Sikh	1.3%	0.9%	1.5%
Jain	0.9%	0.7%	0.5%
Parsi	0.9%	0.5%	0.8%
Other	1.9%	0.1%	0.3%
Total	100%	100%	100%

Religious groups in Karachi City (1872−2023) (Note: 1872-1941: Data for the entirety of the town of Karachi, which included Karachi Municipality and Karachi Cantonment. 2017: Data for the entirety of the town of Karachi, which included the urban populations of Karachi Central District, Karachi East District, Karachi South District, Karachi West District, Malir District, and Korangi District. 2023: Data for the entirety of the town of Karachi, which included the urban populations of Karachi Central District, Karachi East District, Karachi South District, Karachi West District, Malir District, Korangi District, and Keamari District.)
Religious group	1872		1881		1891		1901		1911		1921		1931		1941		2017		2023	
Religious group	Pop.	%	Pop.	%	Pop.	%	Pop.	%	Pop.	%	Pop.	%	Pop.	%	Pop.	%	Pop.	%	Pop.	%
Islam	33,018	55.81%	38,946	52.94%	52,957	50.34%	60,003	51.43%	74,075	48.76%	100,436	46.31%	122,847	46.61%	162,447	42.01%	14,382,744	96.63%	18,189,474	96.53%
Hinduism	23,157	39.14%	24,617	33.47%	44,503	42.3%	48,169	41.29%	66,038	43.47%	100,683	46.42%	120,595	45.76%	192,831	49.87%	156,452	1.05%	211,138	1.12%
Christianity	2,223	3.76%	4,161	5.66%	5,986	5.69%	6,098	5.23%	7,936	5.22%	9,649	4.45%	12,765	4.84%	17,466	4.52%	329,702	2.22%	416,309	2.21%
Zoroastrianism	748	1.26%	937	1.27%	1,375	1.31%	1,823	1.56%	2,165	1.43%	2,702	1.25%	3,334	1.26%	3,700	0.96%	—N/a	—N/a	1,435	0.01%
Judaism	7	0.01%	—N/a	—N/a	128	0.12%	349	0.3%	535	0.35%	645	0.3%	943	0.36%	1,051	0.27%	—N/a	—N/a	—N/a	—N/a
Jainism	4	0.01%	9	0.01%	99	0.09%	125	0.11%	647	0.43%	1,118	0.52%	629	0.24%	3,214	0.83%	—N/a	—N/a	—N/a	—N/a
Tribal	0	0%	—N/a	—N/a	32	0.03%	0	0%	0	0%	4	0%	135	0.05%	—N/a	—N/a	—N/a	—N/a	—N/a	—N/a
Sikhism	0	0%	—N/a	—N/a	0	0%	0	0%	—N/a	—N/a	1,425	0.66%	2,254	0.86%	5,835	1.51%	—N/a	—N/a	2,299	0.01%
Buddhism	0	0%	—N/a	—N/a	0	0%	0	0%	—N/a	—N/a	41	0.02%	53	0.02%	75	0.02%	—N/a	—N/a	—N/a	—N/a
Ahmadiyya	—N/a	—N/a	—N/a	—N/a	—N/a	—N/a	—N/a	—N/a	—N/a	—N/a	—N/a	—N/a	—N/a	—N/a	—N/a	—N/a	8,751	0.06%	7,948	0.04%
Others	0	0%	4,890	6.65%	119	0.11%	96	0.08%	507	0.33%	180	0.08%	10	0%	36	0.01%	6,753	0.05%	15,241	0.08%
Total population	59,157	100%	73,560	100%	105,199	100%	116,663	100%	151,903	100%	216,883	100%	263,565	100%	386,655	100%	14,884,402	100%	18,843,844	100%

== Trivia ==
Stunned by Karachi's diverse demographics, the American political scientist and South Asia expert Stephen P. Cohen once stated that if Karachi's ethnic groups "got along well, it would be an amazingly complex city, a lot like New York."

== See also ==
- Demographic history of Karachi
- Ethnic groups in Karachi
- Religion in Karachi
- Demographics of Pakistan
  - Demographics of Sindh
  - Demographics of Punjab, Pakistan
  - Demographics of Khyber Pakhtunkhwa
  - Demographics of Balochistan
- List of metropolitan areas by population

== Sources ==
- Blank, Jonah; Clary, Christopher; Nichiporuk, Brian (30 October 2014), Drivers of Long-Term insecurity and Instability in Pakistan: Urbanization, Rand Corporation, ISBN 978-0-8330-8751-5
- Cohen, Stephen P. (2004), The Idea of Pakistan, Brookings Institution Press, ISBN 978-0-8157-9761-6
- Thomas, Amos Owen (3 October 2005), Imagi-Nations and Borderless Television: Media, Culture and Politics Across Asia, SAGE, ISBN 978-0-7619-3396-0
