= Demographic history of Karachi =

The demographic history of Karachi of Sindh, Pakistan. The city of Karachi grew from a small fishing village to a megacity in the last 175 years.

The Late Palaeolithic and Mesolithic sites found by Karachi University team on the Mulri Hills, in front of Karachi University Campus, constitute one of the most important archaeological discoveries made in Sindh during the last fifty years. The last hunter-gatherers, who left abundant traces of their passage, repeatedly inhabited the Hills. Some twenty different spots of flint tools were discovered during the surface surveys.

Karachi was known to the ancient Greeks by many names: Krokola, the place where Alexander the Great camped to prepare a fleet for Babylonia after his campaign in the Indus Valley; Morontobara (probably Manora island near Karachi harbour) whence Alexander's admiral Nearchus set sail; and Barbarikon, a port of the Bactrian kingdom. It was later known to the Arabs as Debal from where Muhammad bin Qasim led his conquering force into South Asia in AD 712.

Karachi was reputedly founded as "Kolachi" by Med tribes from Makran, who established a small fishing community in the area. Descendants of the original community still live in the area on the small island of Abdullah Goth, which is located near the Karachi Port. The original name "Kolachi" survives in the name of a well-known Karachi locality named Mai Kolachi in Sindhi. Mirza Ghazi Beg, the Mughal administrator of Sindh, is among the first historical figures credited for the development of coastal Sindh (consisting of regions such as the Makran coast and the Indus delta), including the cities of Thatta, Bhambore and Karachi. The ancient names of Karachi included: Krokola, Barbarikon, Nawa Nar, Rambagh, Kurruck, Karak Bander, Auranga Bandar, Minnagara, Kolachi, Morontobara, Kolachi-jo-Goth, Banbhore, Debal, Barbarice and Kurrachee.

In the seventeenth century, Karak Bander was a small port on the Arabian Sea on the estuary of the Hub River, 40 km west of present-day Karachi. It was a transit point for the South Asian-Central Asian trade. The estuary silted up due to heavy rains in 1728 and the harbour could no longer be used. As a result, the merchants of Karak Bander decided to relocate their activities to what is today known as Karachi. Trade increased between 1729 and 1839 because of the silting up of Shahbandar and Keti Bandar (important ports on the Indus River) and the shifting of their activities to Karachi.

The village that later grew out of this settlement was known as Kolachi-jo-Goth (Village of Kolachi in Sindhi). By the late 1720s, the village was trading across the Arabian Sea with Muscat and the Persian Gulf region. The local Balochistan populace built a small fort, that was constructed for the protection of the city, armed with cannons imported by those sailors from Muscat, Oman. The fort had two main gateways: one facing the sea, known as Kharra Darwaaza (Brackish Gate) (Kharadar) and the other facing the Lyari River known as the Meet'ha Darwaaza (Sweet Gate) (Mithadar), which correspond to the modern areas of Kharadar and Mithadar.

The name Karachi was used for the first time in a Dutch document of 1742, when a merchant ship de Ridderkerk shipwrecked nearby its coast.

The earliest inhabitants of the area that became Karachi were the Sindhi Muslim fisherman, Sindhi Hindu businessmen, Sindhi Landlords (Both Muslim & Hindus), Gujarati merchant communities from the province of Gujarat Gujarat such as the Bohri, Khoja, Parsis and Marwari people from Rajasthan in the east and Baloch in the west from Balochistan. The Gujarati merchant communities made their business settlements in Karachi after the then British Government carried out first regular town planning of Karachi to build a modern port. Before the end of British colonial rule and the subsequent independence of Pakistan in 1947, the population of the city was majority Gujarati people, Marwari people, Hindus, a small number of Sikhs, local Jewish community and a large number of Christian community as well, but the community is still present numbering around 250,000 residents. The city was, and still is home to a large community of Gujarati Muslims who were one of the earliest settlers in the city, and still form the majority in Saddar Town. Important Gujarati Muslim communities in the city include the Memon, Chhipa, Ghanchi, Khoja, Bohra and Tai. Other early settlers included the Marwari Muslims, Parsis having their origins to the province of Gujarat, Marathi Muslims and Konkani Muslims from Maharashtra (settled in Kokan Town), Goan Catholics and Anglo-Indians. Most non-Muslims left the city to India in the 1950s, after independence, but there are still small communities of Parsis, Goan Catholics and Anglo-Indians in the city.

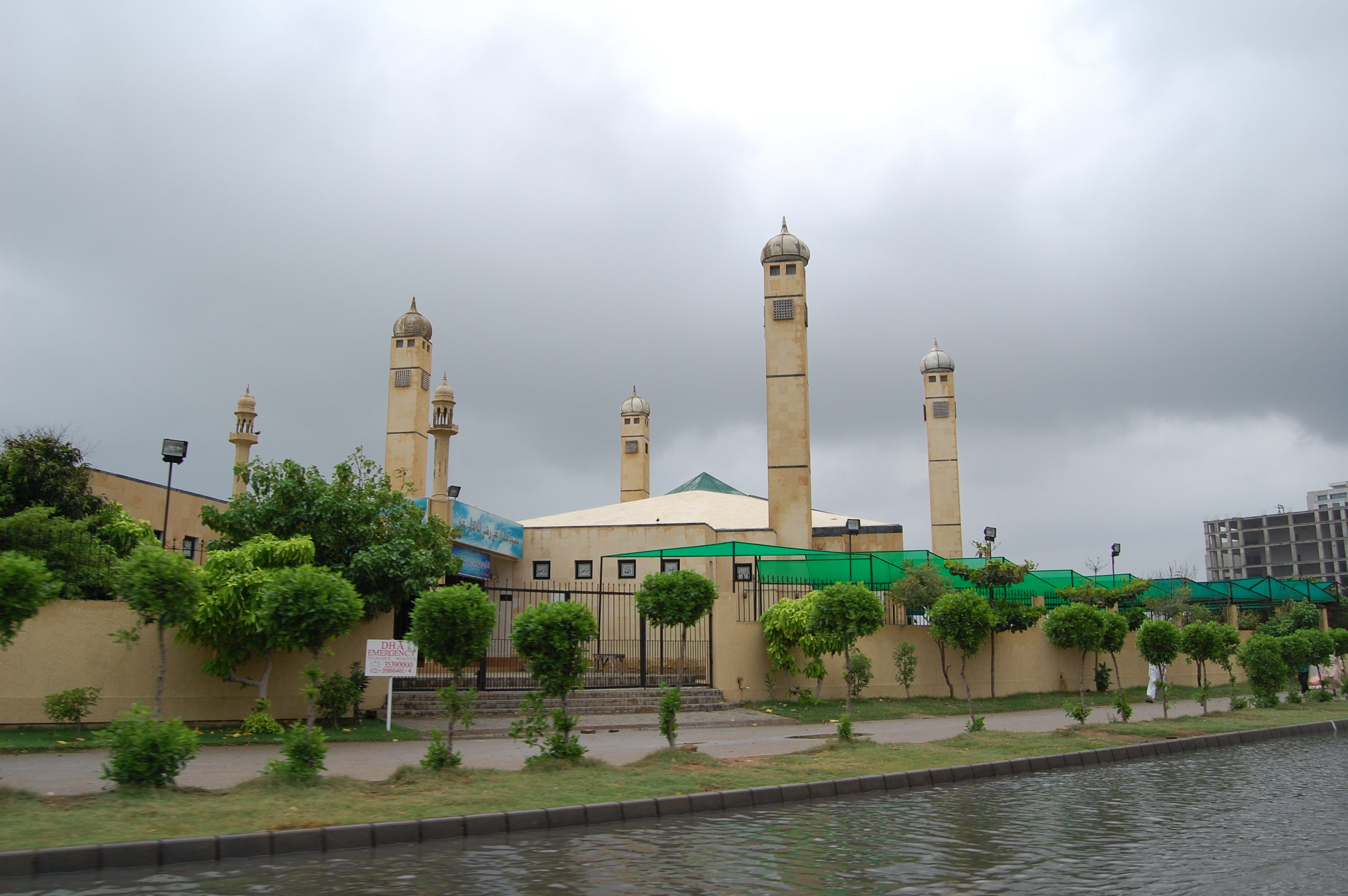
A mosque of Defence Housing Authority

The independence of Pakistan in 1947 saw the influx of Muslim Muhajirs from India, fleeing partly because of the Hindu-Muslim riots and partly because of their political affiliations to the Muslim League, which founded Pakistan. The majority of the Urdu speaking and a small number of Punjabi Muslim refugees had fled from various states of East Punjab to settle in Karachi, which is why the culture of the city is a blend of South Asia. Most properties vacated by non-Muslims, who left Karachi due to the new settlements made by these refugees, were granted to Muslim refugees through claims on behalf of the properties they claimed of leaving behind in India. Today, the descendants of these Muslim refugees are known as Muhajirs form a powerful large population of Karachi. These small ethno-linguist groups are being assimilated in the Urdu speaking community. Significant internal migration of ethnic Sindhis from rural areas of Sindh to Karachi began in subsequent decades, driven by the city's role as Pakistan's economic hub, federal capital (until 1959), and provincial capital, offering opportunities in industry, bureaucracy, and employment. This migration accelerated particularly from the 1960s onward during periods of rapid economic growth, with Sindhis joining other groups such as Pashtuns in moving to the city for work. The trend has continued in recent decades, with Sindhi speakers increasing from 7.62% of Karachi's population in 1998 to 10.67% in 2017 and 11.12% in 2023, reflecting ongoing rural-urban migration within Sindh. Pashtun migration to Karachi began in the 1960s, driven by economic opportunities. It intensified in the 1980s with Afghan refugees fleeing the Soviet–Afghan War. Pashtuns are now the second-largest ethnic group, with Pashto speakers at 13.52% per the 2023 census., These factors overall makes Karachi a melting pot of all ethnicities of Pakistan throughout the history.

== Picture gallery ==
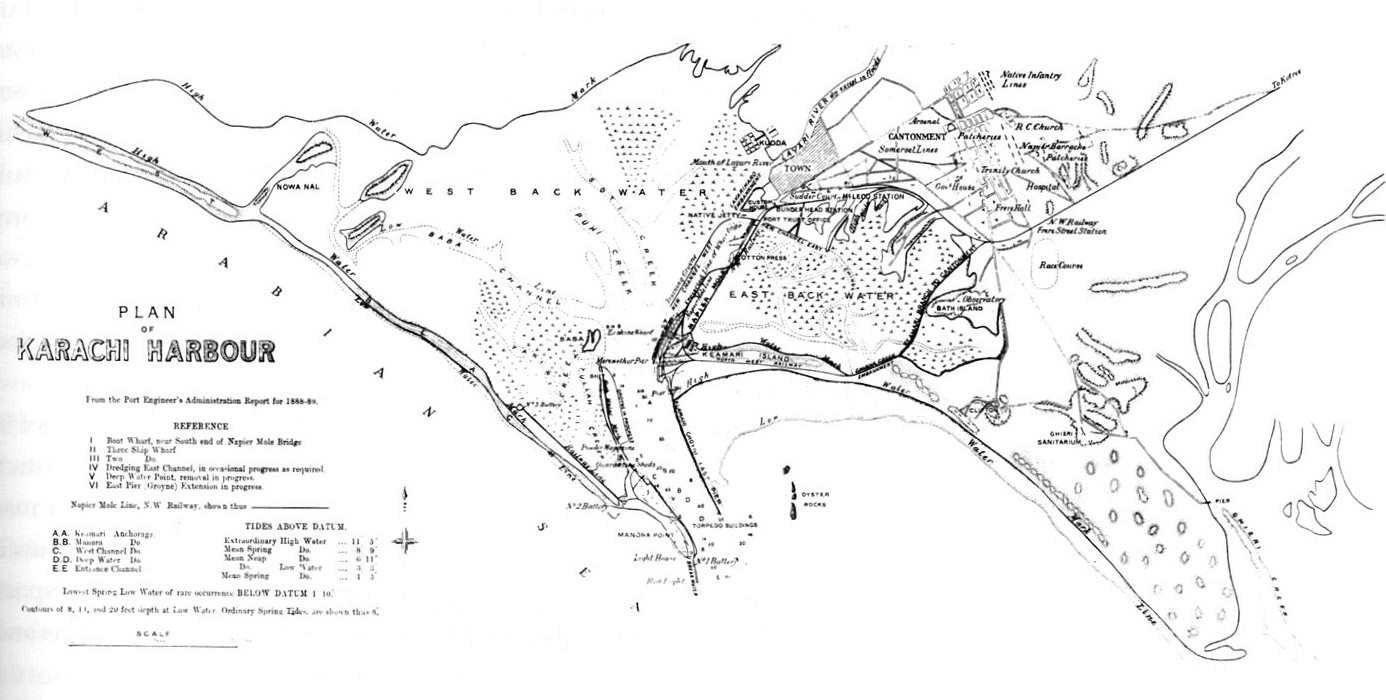
A map of Karachi from 1889

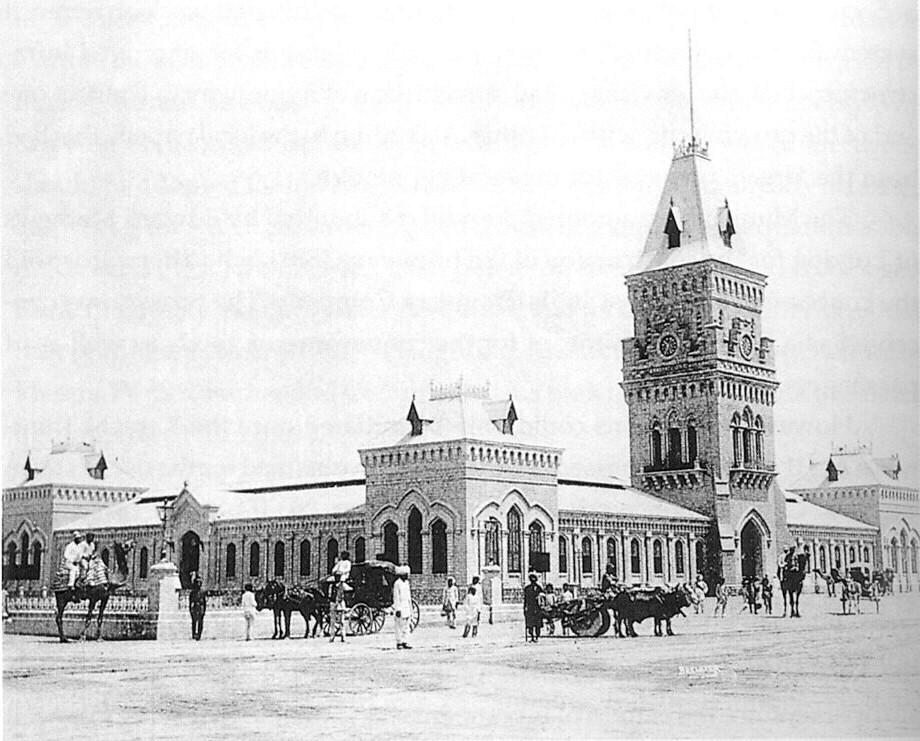
The Empress Market, 1890

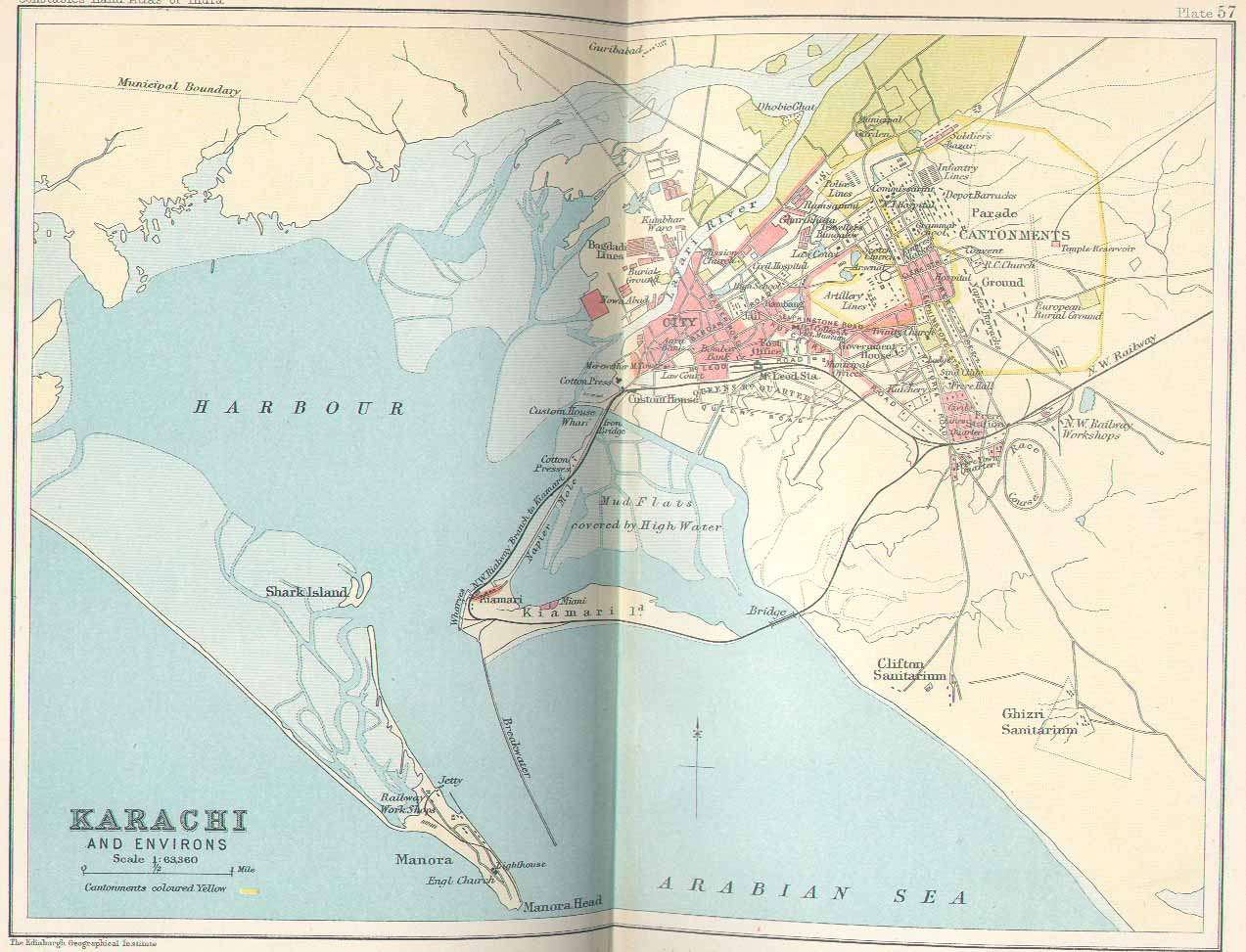
A map of Karachi from 1893

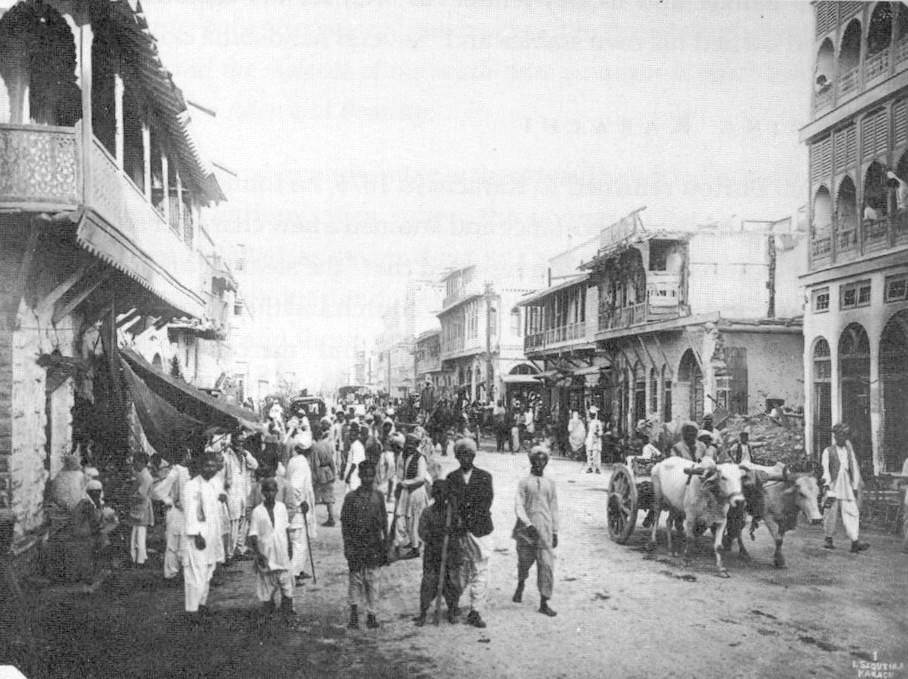
View of the dense old native town by the end of the 19th century

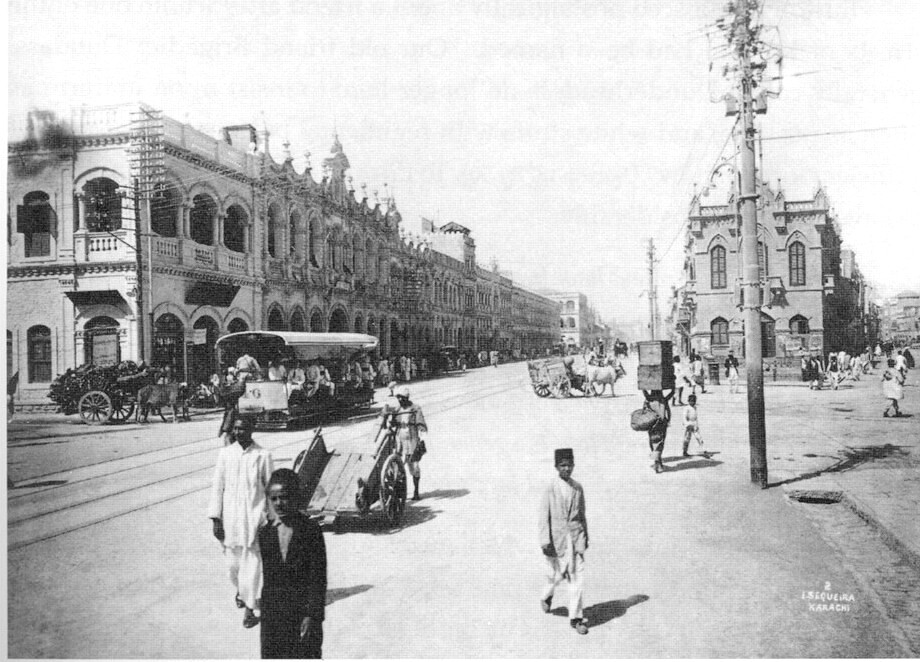
View of the Bunder Road (now M. A. Jinnah Rd.), 1900

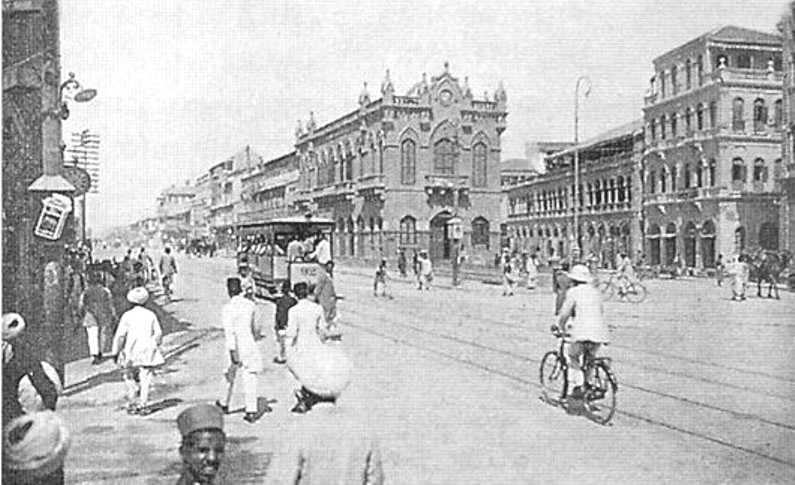
Bunder Road

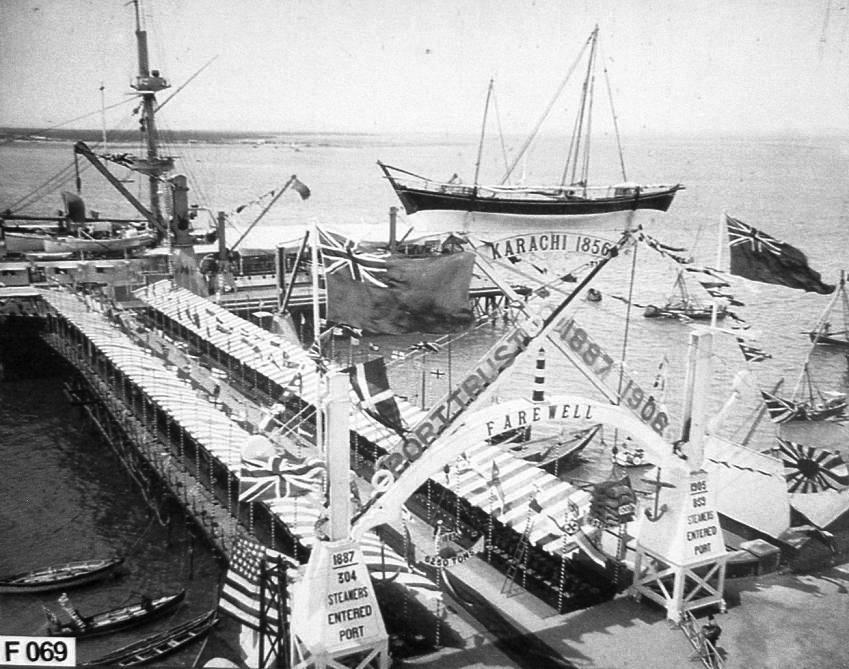
Farewell arch erected by the Karachi Port for the Royal visit of Prince of Wales, later King George V, 1906

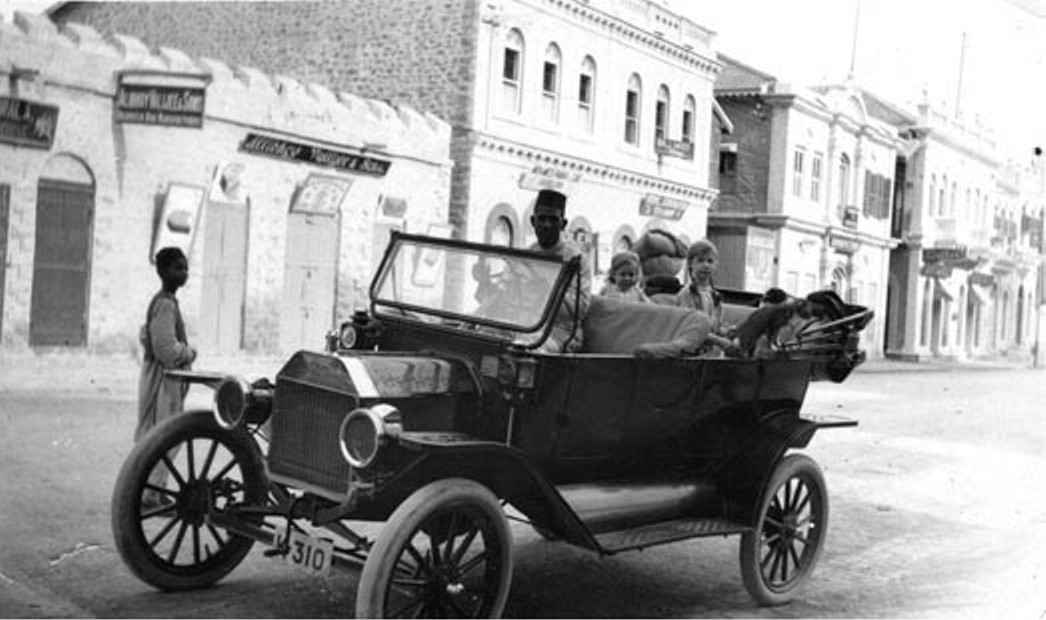
British family at Elphinstone St., 1914

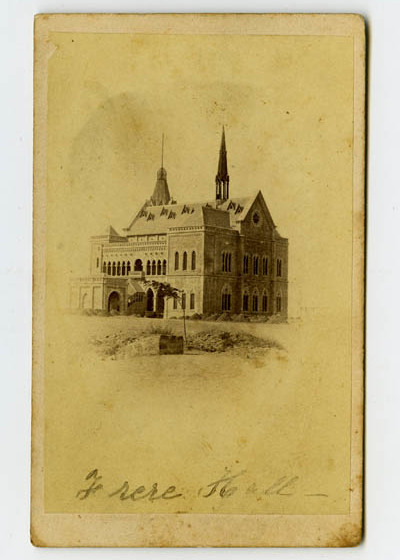
Frere Hall, Karachi, c1860.

== See also ==
- Ethnic groups in Karachi
- Demographics of Karachi
- Religion in Karachi
- History of Karachi
- Demographics of Sindh
- Demographics of Pakistan
- List of metropolitan areas by population
