= Ethnic groups in Karachi =

Ethnicities of Karachi, Pakistan

Ethnic groups in Karachi include nearly all the major ethnic communities found in Pakistan, making Karachi one of the most ethnically diverse urban centers in the country. According to the 2023 Pakistani census, Urdu is the largest language, spoken by 50.60% of the city's population. It is followed by Pashto at 13.5% followed by Sindhi at 11.12%. Karachi's inhabitants, locally known as Karachiites, are composed of ethnolinguistic groups from all parts of Pakistan, as well as long-distance migrants from Asia, making the city's population a cultural and demographic melting pot. Karachi has the largest populations of Urdu-speaking, Sindhi-speaking, and Pashto-speaking people of any city in Pakistan in absolute numbers.

At the end of the 19th century, the population of the city was approximately 105,000, with a gradual increase over the next few decades, reaching more than 400,000 on the eve of Pakistan's independence in 1947. The 2023 Pakistani census estimates Karachi's population at 20.3 million, of which an estimated 30% are migrants from different backgrounds. The city's population is estimated to be growing at about 5% per year (mainly as a result of internal rural-urban migration), including an estimated 45,000 migrant workers coming to the city every month from different parts of Pakistan.

== Overview ==
Karachi is host to many Western expatriates. During World War II, about 3,000 Polish refugees from the Soviet Union were evacuated to Karachi by the British. Some of these Polish families settled permanently in the city. There are also communities of American and British expatriates.

=== Muhajirs ===
Following the independence of Pakistan in 1947, large numbers of Muslim refugees (Muhajirs) migrated from India. In Karachi, these Muhajirs, now form the plurality of the population. Many of these refugees lost their land and property in India, though some were partially compensated by properties left by Sindhi Hindus who migrated to India. Various ethnic groups, including Muslims mostly from United Province, Central Provinces and Berar, But a sizeable amount of the Kutchi people, Gujaratis, Konkanis, Hyderabadis, Marathis, Rajasthanis, also fled India and settled in Karachi. There is also a sizable community of Malayali Muslims in Karachi (the Mappila), originally from Kerala in South India.

After the Indo-Pakistani War of 1971, thousands of Biharis and Bengalis from Bangladesh arrived in the city. Today, Karachi is home to an estimated 1 to 2 million ethnic Bengalis, many of whom migrated during the 1980s and 1990s. They were followed by Rohingya Muslim refugees from western Myanmar (for more information, see Burmese people in Pakistan).

=== Sindhis ===
Historically, Karachi had a substantial Sindhi population before 1947, but large-scale arrivals of Muhajirs and other groups and migration of Sindhi Hindus out of Karachi, shifted demographics; However, many Sindhis, primarily from other parts of Sindh province (including areas such as Hyderabad, Larkana, Sukkur, Nawabshah, Dadu, Thatta, Badin and other regions), have migrated to Karachi in increasing numbers since the post-Partition period, significant acceleration from the 1960s onward and continuing steadily in recent decades. This rural-to-urban migration has been driven by Karachi's position as Pakistan's main economic and industrial hub as well as Capital of Sindh province providing better job opportunities in manufacturing, trade, services, government employment, and urban infrastructure compared to the limited prospects in some parts of rural Sindh

According to the 2023 census (as reported in Dawn newspaper analysis), Sindhi speakers (predominantly Muslim Sindhis) make up about 11.2% of Karachi's population, up from 10.67% in 2017 and 7.62% in 1998, indicating sustained migration trends.

They are most concentrated in Malir district (where Sindhi speakers reach around 35% of the population, the highest among Karachi districts), as well as large and historic proportions in parts of Karachi East and Karachi South inside which many designated areas are Sindhi majority or Plurality, alongside other peripheral and semi-rural/suburban areas attracting rural-urban migrants.

=== Pashtuns ===
The Pashtuns, originally from Khyber Pakhtunkhwa, Afghanistan, the Federally Administered Tribal Areas, and northern Balochistan, have settled in Karachi for decades and are now the city's second largest ethnic group after Muhajirs. With an estimated population as high as 2 million, Karachi is believed to have the largest urban Pakhtun population in the world, including approximately 50,000 registered Afghan refugees. Pashtuns are estimated to constitute about 14% of Karachi's population. As such, Karachi is home to the world's largest urban community of Pashtuns, larger than those of Kabul and Peshawar.

=== Punjabis ===
Large numbers of Punjabis from northern Punjab and Saraikis from southern Punjab have also settled in Karachi.

=== Others ===
Among Karachi's underprivileged minority communities are the Siddis (Sheedis), who are descended from African slaves and have largely adopted Balochi and Sindhi as their native languages. Many other refugees from Central Asian countries constituting the former Soviet Union have also settled in the city as economic migrants. There are also communities of Arabs, Filipinos, and an economic elite of Sinhalese from Sri Lanka. Expatriates from China have a history going back to the 1940s; today, many of the Chinese are second-generation children of immigrants who came to the city and worked as dentists, chefs and shoemakers.

=== Language ===
1. Urdu (50.6%)
2. Pashto (13.5%)
3. Sindhi (11.1%)
4. Punjabi (8.08%)
5. Saraiki (3.70%)
6. Balochi (3.97%)
7. Hindko (3.20%)
8. Others (5.73%)

Karachi has the largest number of Muhajirs. As per the 2023 census, the linguistic breakdown of Karachi Division is:

Language	Rank	2023 census	Speakers	2017 census	Speakers	1998 census	Speakers	1981 census	Speakers
Urdu	1	50.60%	10,315,905	42.30%	6,779,142	48.52%	4,497,747	54.34%	2,830,098
Pashto	2	13.52%	2,752,148	15.01%	2,406,011	11.42%	1,058,650	8.71%	453,628
Sindhi	3	11.12%	2,264,189	10.67%	1,709,877	7.22%	669,340	6.29%	327,591
Punjabi	4	8.08%	1,645,282	10.73%	1,719,636	13.94%	1,292,335	13.64%	710,389
Saraiki	5	3.70%	753,903	4.98%	798,031	2.11%	195,681	0.35%	18,228
Balochi	6	3.97%	808,352	4.04%	648,964	4.34%	402,386	4.39%	228,636
Others	7	8.93%	1,817,695	12.25%	1,963,233	12.44%	1,153,126	12.27%	639,560
All		100%	20,357,474	100%	16,024,894	100%	9,269,265	100%	5,208,132

The category of "others" includes Hindko, Kashmiri, Kohistani, Burushaski, Gujarati, Memoni, Marwari, Dari, Brahui, Makrani, Khowar, Gilgiti, Balti, Arabic, Farsi, and Bengali.

The ethnic groups in Karachi include members from all ethnic groups in Pakistan, making the city's population a diverse melting pot. At the end of the 19th century, the population of the city was about 105,000, with a gradual increase over the next few decades, reaching more than 400,000 on the eve of independence. Estimates of the population are approximately 23,000,000, of which an estimated 90% are migrants from different backgrounds. The city's population is estimated to be growing at about 5% per year (mainly as a result of internal rural-urban migration), including an estimated 45,000 migrant workers coming to the city every month from different parts of Pakistan. According to the community leaders and social scientists there are over 1.6 million Bengalis and up to 400,000 Rohingyas living in Karachi.

According to the census of 1998, the religious breakdown of the city was: Muslim (96.45%); Christian (2.42%); Hindu (0.86%); Ahmadiyya (0.17%); others (0.10%) (Parsis, Sikhs, Baháʼís, Jews and Buddhists).

== See also ==
- Ethnic groups in Pakistan
- Ethnic groups in Sindh
- Demographic history of Karachi
- Demographics of Karachi
- Religion in Karachi
- Demographics of Sindh
- Demographics of Pakistan
- List of metropolitan areas by population

== Sources ==
- Blank, Jonah; Clary, Christopher; Nichiporuk, Brian (30 October 2014), Drivers of Long-Term insecurity and Instability in Pakistan: Urbanization, Rand Corporation, ISBN 978-0-8330-8751-5
- Cohen, Stephen P. (2004), The Idea of Pakistan, Brookings Institution Press, ISBN 978-0-8157-9761-6
- Thomas, Amos Owen (3 October 2005), Imagi-Nations and Borderless Television: Media, Culture and Politics Across Asia, SAGE, ISBN 978-0-7619-3396-0
