= Liaquat =

Liaquat may refer to:

- Liaquat Ali Khan, Former Prime Minister of Pakistan
- Liaquat National Memorial Library, located in Karachi, Pakistan
- Ra'ana Liaquat Ali Khan, Pakistani politician
- Liaquat–Nehru Pact, accord between India and Pakistan
- Liaquat University of Medical and Health Sciences, located in Jamshoro, Sindh, Pakistan
- Liaqat National Bagh, at Jamshoro, Sindh, Pakistan
- Liaquat Ahamed, Pulitzer Prize-winning author
- Aamir Liaquat, Pakistani politician
- Liaquat National Hospital, located in Karachi, Pakistan.
- Maulvi Liaquat Ali, Indian religious leader
- Liaquat University Hospital, Hyderabad, located in Pakistan
- Liaquat Soldier, Pakistani actor
- Liaquat Ali (athlete), Pakistani athlete

== See also ==
- Liaqat
- Liaqat Ali (disambiguation)
