= Liaqat Ali (disambiguation) =

Liaquat Ali or Liaquat Ali Khan, or variants may also refer to:

- Liaquat Ali Khan (1895–1951), Pakistani politician, statesman and first Prime Minister of Pakistan
- Liaquat Ali Khan (officer) (born 1948), Bangladeshi Air Force officer and freedom fighter
- Liaqat Ali (cricketer) (born 1955), Pakistani Test cricketer
- Liaquat Ali (athlete) (born 1983), Pakistani athlete
- Liaquat Ali, better known as Liaquat Soldier (1952–2011), Pakistani actor
- Liaquat Ali (Brahmanbaria politician)
- Liaquat Ali (Chittagong politician)
- Liaquat Ali Khan (director)
- Liaquat Ali Khan (Sargodha politician)
- Liaqat Ali Khan (Khyber Pakhtunkhwa politician)
- Liaqat Ali Khan (Mutlan politician)
- Liaqat Ali, Indian Lawyer
- Liaquat Ali (professor)

== See also ==
- Mir Liaquat Ali Lehri, Pakistani businessman and politician
- Maulvi Liaquat Ali (1817–1892), leader of the Indian Rebellion of 1857
- Liaquat Ali Asim, Pakistani poet
- Liaquat Ali Askani, Pakistani politician
- Liaqat Ali Bangulzai, Pakistani politician
- Liaquat Ali Chattha, Pakistani civil servant
- Liquat Ali Chowdhury, Bangladeshi diplomat
- Liaquat Ali Jatoi, Pakistani politician
- Liaquat Ali Lucky, Bangladeshi actor
