= Suhaib Webb =

American imam (born 1972)

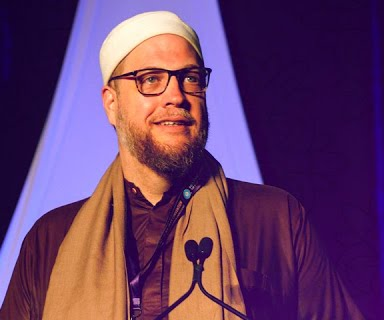
- Webb in 2023
- Born: William Webb; June 29, 1972 (age 54); Oklahoma, United States
- Education: Al-Azhar University
- Occupation: Imam

YouTube information
- Channel: Suhaib Webb
- Years active: 2008–present
- Subscribers: 25.7 thousand
- Views: 416 thousand
- Last updated: 26 October 2022
- Website: suhaibwebb.com

Suhaib Webb is an American imam. He previously served as the imam of the Islamic Society of Boston Cultural Center (ISBCC).

== Biography ==
=== Early life ===
He was born William Webb in 1972 in Oklahoma to a Christian family, including a grandfather who served as a preacher. At age 14, he lost interest in religion, going through a self-described spiritual crisis. He also began engaging in delinquency by joining a local gang and became a local hip hop DJ and producer, making records with various artists.

=== Education ===
After converting to Islam in 1992, Webb left his career as a DJ and studied at the University of Central Oklahoma, where he graduated with a bachelor's degree in education. He also studied privately under a Senegalese sheikh, learning enough Islam and Arabic to become a community leader in Oklahoma City, where he was hired as imam at the Islamic Society of Greater Oklahoma City. He simultaneously started teaching at Mercy School, an Islamic K–12 school in Oklahoma City. He also obtained a degree in Islamic Law from Al Azhar University.

While studying at Al-Azhar, Webb served as the head of translation at Dar Al-Iftaa Al-Misriyya, the world's largest Fatwa office. There, under the supervision of various scholars, such as Emad Effat and Ali Gomaa, Webb issued religious verdicts in English and Arabic.

== Career ==
Webb is an active member of the Muslim American Society and its youth department and has been so for the last ten years. It is through the Muslim American Society's scholarship program that he was sent to Egypt to attain fluency in Arabic and focus on Islamic studies. Webb frequently hosts lectures and posts articles offering Islamic perspectives on modern-day issues such as community involvement and social relevance.

Apart from his studies, he frequently lectures in the United States and Malaysia, and records public lecture series on Islam and contemporary Muslim matters. After graduating from Al-Azhar, he moved to Santa Clara in the San Francisco Bay area, where he worked with the bay area Muslim American Society Office and Muslim Community Association. On December 1, 2011, Webb was inaugurated as the imam of the Islamic Society of Boston's Cultural Center (ISBCC), the largest Islamic center in New England. Following his tenure at the Islamic Society of Boston's Cultural Center, he then served as the Resident Scholar of the Islamic Center of New York University.

He helped raise $20,000 for widows and children of firefighters killed in the 9/11 attacks. He has spoken out against radical clerics that seek to prey on insecure youth and their American identities. He frequently shares advice, lessons and “SnapWas” on his SnapChat. He has also been hailed as one of the World's 500 Most Influential Muslims.

He also founded the Suhaib Webb Institute for Sacred Studies(SWISS) dedicated to teaching the Islamic sciences online.

== Reputation ==
According to a strategy report by the UK government, senior UK government officials, including representatives of nine of the biggest Whitehall departments, consider Webb as a notable moderate leader for mainstream Muslims along with the likes of Hamza Yusuf and Amr Khaled, who should receive more support in providing leadership to Muslims in the West. Webb was named one of the 500 Most Influential Muslims in the World by the Royal Islamic Strategic Studies Centre in 2010. Webb's website, SuhaibWebb.com, was voted the best "Blog of the Year" by the 2009 Brass Crescent Awards, and his tweets won him the vote of "Best Muslim Tweeter" of 2010.

In the April 2016 issue of Dabiq Magazine, The Islamic State of Iraq and the Levant declared him a murtadd (or apostate).

== Views and accomplishments ==
Webb had gone on a trip with a group of imams to Auschwitz in 2010, and then following the trip, publicly condemned Holocaust-denial and anti-Semitism. He helped raise $20,000 for widows and children of firefighters killed in the 9/11 attack. He is a part of efforts to more effectively rebut militants and religious extremists and is an advocate for grassroots Muslim activism to promote social change. He advocates for an American-style Islam, one which he claims to be true to the Quran and Islamic law but that reflects the country's customs and culture. He has spoken out against radical clerics that seek to prey on insecure youth and their American identities, stating that "We do have to shepherd them and look out for people like al-Awlaki who tries to undermine that (U.S.) experience and use it against them." Following the Boston Marathon bombing, Webb condemned the acts as radical and joined with interfaith clergy to pray that "we continue to live in harmony, honoring and celebrating our similarities and differences, working together for the common good."

== Controversies ==
In 2007, Webb wrote an article calling homosexuality an “evil inclination” and told a gay would-be convert to Islam to seek treatment for his “problems”. He says he has since re-thought the issue and says that though homosexuality is sinful, the constitution guarantees everyone the right to be married. Webb has also had LGBT people contribute to his website, noting that a time has come for a change how the community addresses this issue.

On April 19, 2013, Webb was replaced as the representative of Boston's Muslim community to the interfaith service honoring the victims of the Boston Marathon bombing at the Cathedral of the Holy Cross by Governor Deval Patrick's office for undisclosed reasons. Webb still attended in the pews along with several other prominent imams. Webb was replaced by Nasser Wedaddy, director of civil rights outreach for the American Islamic Congress and chair of the New England Interfaith Council.
