= Iffat Miraj Awan =

Pakistani politician

Member of the Provincial Assembly of the Punjab
- In office 29 May 2013 – 31 May 2018

Personal details
- Born: 15 October 1971 (age 55) Jaranwala
- Party: Pakistan Muslim League (N)

Iffat Miraj Awan (Urdu: عفت معراج اعوان; born 15 October 1971) is a Pakistani politician who had been a Member of the Provincial Assembly of the Punjab, from May 2013 to May 2018.

== Early life and education ==
Iffat was born on 15 October 1971 in Jaranwala.

She graduated from University of the Punjab in 1995 and has the degree of Bachelor of Arts.

== Political career ==
She was elected to the Provincial Assembly of the Punjab as a candidate of Pakistan Muslim League (N) (PML-N) from Constituency PP-53 (Faisalabad-III) in the 2013 Pakistani general election. She received 44,754 votes and defeated Malik Zafar Iqbal Khokhar, a candidate of Pakistan Tehreek-e-Insaf (PTI).
