= Marwari Muslims =

Muslim ethnic group

Marwari Muslim
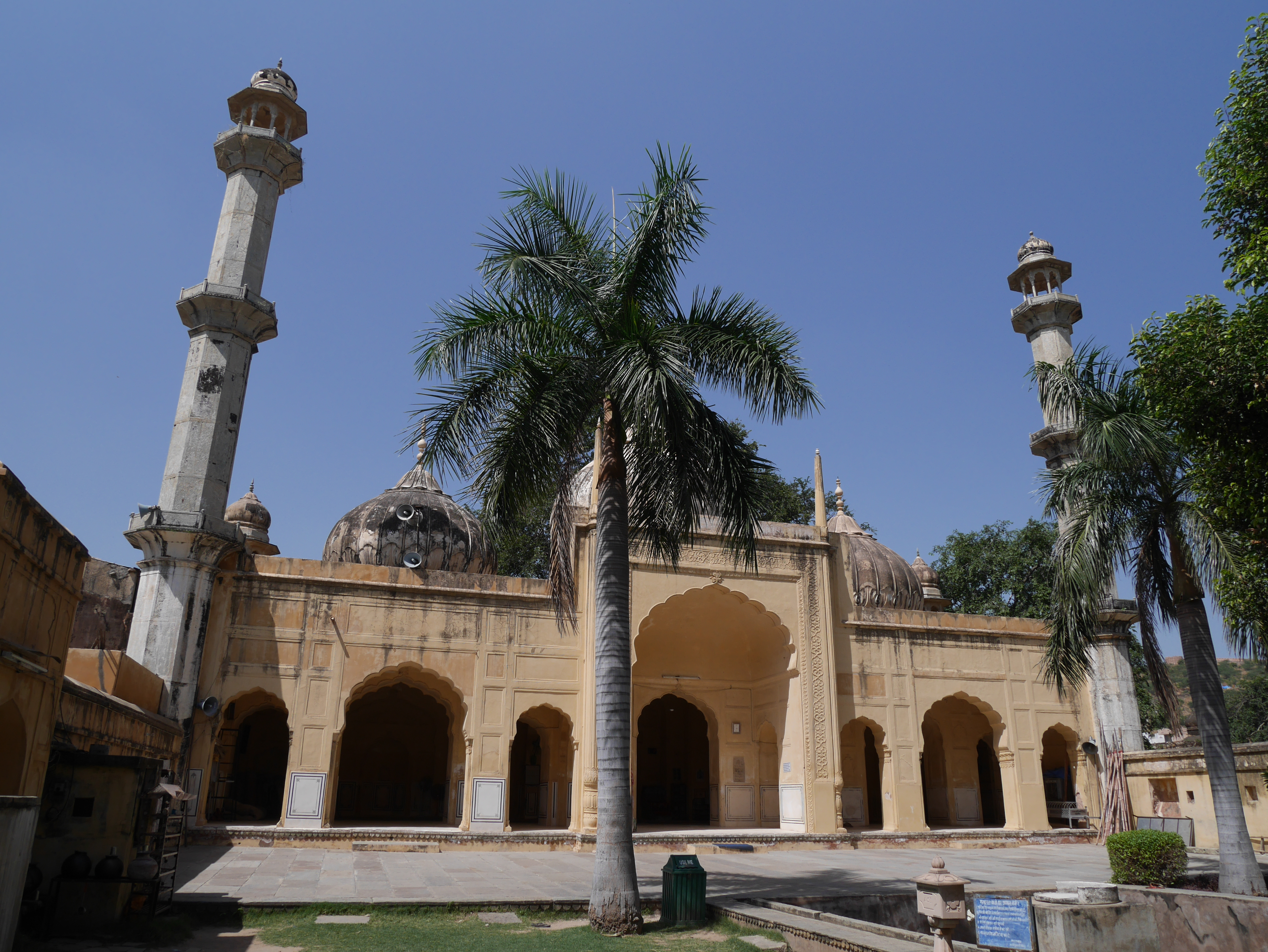

Regions with significant populations
- India • Pakistan

Religions
- Islam

Languages
- Marwari • Rajasthani

The Marwari Muslims or Marwadi Muslims (Marwari: मारवाड़ी मुसलमान, ماروارؕی مسلمان) are an Indian and Pakistani ethnic group that originate from the Rajasthan region of India. Their language, also called Marwari, is a dialect of Rajasthani and is a part of the western group of Indo-Aryan languages. They can also found in the state of Meghalaya.

== Notable people ==
- Muhammad Hashim Gazdar (1893–1968), representative from Sindh to the Constituent Assembly of Pakistan
- Liaquat Soldier (1952–2011), Pakistani comedy actor, writer and director

== See also ==
- Islam in India
