= Iffat-un-Nissa Begum =

- Consort of the Durrani Empire
- Spouse: Nasrullah Mirza; Ahmad Shah Durrani
- House: Timurid (by birth); Afsharid (by marriage); Durrani (by marriage)
- Father: Dawar Bakhsh
- Religion: Islam

Iffat-un-Nissa Begum (Persian: عفت النسا بیگم; meaning 'Modest among Women') was a Mughal princess, the daughter of Prince Dawar Bakhsh, the great grandson of Emperor Shah Jahan.

== Family and lineage ==
Iffat-un-Nissa was born a Mughal princess, the daughter of Prince Dawar Bakhsh. He was the son of Prince Izad Bakhsh, son of Prince Murad Bakhsh, the son of Emperor Shah Jahan and his wife Mumtaz Mahal. His mother was Mihr-un-Nissa Begum, the daughter of Emperor Aurangzeb and his consort Aurangabadi Mahal.

== Marriages ==
=== Nasrullah Mirza ===
On 26 March 1739 Emperor Nadir Shah of the Afsharid dynasty of Persia, married Iffat-un-Nissa to his younger son Nasrullah Mirza. According to the Mughal custom, Nasrullah was required to give an account of his ancestors up to seventh generation. Nadir Shah told him to say that he was the son of Nadir Shah, grandson of the sword, great grandson of the sword, and so on. For one week before the ceremony, rejoicings on a grand scale continued day and night. The bank of Jamuna opposite the Diwan-i-Khas was illuminated with lamps every night with combats of elephants, oxen, tigers, and deer were held in the day.

=== Ahmad Shah Durrani ===
After Nasrullah's death, the Durrani emperor Ahmed Shah Durrani married her himself. In April 1757, after sacking the imperial capital of Delhi, he married the deceased Emperor Muhammad Shah's 16-year-old daughter, Hazrat Begum. The retreating camp included Iffat-un-Nissa and Gauhar-un-Nissa Begum, the daughter of Alamgir II as well.
