= Emad Effat =

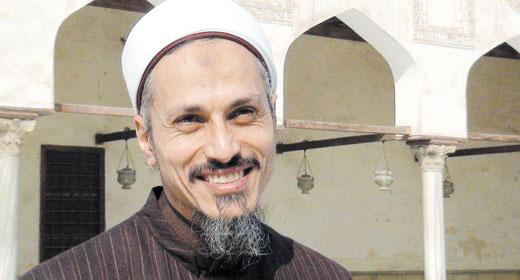
Sheikh Emad at al-Azhar Mosque

Sheikh Emad Effat (15 August 1959 – 16 December 2011) was a senior Egyptian Sunni Islamic cleric at al-Azhar Mosque who was shot and killed during protest demonstrations on 16 December 2011. Effat had participated in the Arab Spring demonstrations in Egypt since the January uprising.

== Background ==
Effat was born in Giza Governorate in Egypt to Ahmed Effat, a calligrapher. He was one of four children. Effat graduated from Arabic Language from the Faculty of Arts at Ain Shams University in 1991 with a BA with honors. In the late 1990s, he also obtained a Bachelor of Sharia (Islamic Law) and a Diploma in Islamic Jurisprudence from the Faculty of Sharia and Law at Al-Azhar University. He is survived by his wife, Nashwa Abdel Tawwab, a journalist at Al-Ahram Weekly newspaper.

The Al-Azhar Sheikh was the director of fatwas, religious edicts, at Dar Al-Iftaa since 2003. He also worked as a Sharia researcher at the House of Authentication of Religious Studies and a researcher at MSX International Programming Company.

According to his widow, he had been participating in popular demonstrations since Egypt’s January uprising.

“During sit-ins at Tahrir Square, he would go to work in the morning and spend the night in the square. He wasn’t able to join the Cabinet sit-in, but when he saw [the violence], he couldn’t just stand and watch people dying, so he went down to the protest.”

== Death ==
According to Yasmine El Rashidi of the New York Review of Books, quoting "a close associate of Ali Gomaa, the Mufti of Al-Azhar, “He was definitely targeted. Although the bullets weren’t fired by a soldier, the army is clearly complicit, letting it happen.” According to this theory, the government was trying to use the death of a popular Sheikh to stir anger towards the protest movement. However at a funeral march 17 December thousands of mourners chanted “Down with military rule.” In an obituary, Al-masry Al-youm stated that he had been killed "by military police with a gunshot to his heart."
