= Religion in Karachi =

Religions in Karachi City (2023)
| Religions | Percent |
| Islam | 96.52% |
| Christianity | 2.14% |
| Hinduism | 1.17% |
| Others | 0.17% |

Religions in Karachi include Islam, Christianity, Hinduism, Sikhism, Buddhism, Zoroastrianism and others. According to a 2023 census of Pakistan, the religious breakdown of the city is as follows: Muslim (96.52%), Christian (2.14%), Hindu (1.17%), other (0.17%). Other religious groups include Parsis, Sikhs, Baháʼí, Jews and Buddhists.

Of the Muslims, approximately 66% are Sunnis and 34% are Shia. The Sunnis follow Hanafi fiqh while Shi'ites are predominantly Ithnā‘Ashariyyah fiqh, with significant minority groups who follow Ismaili Fiqh, which is composed of Nizari (Aga Khanis), Mustaali, Dawoodi Bohra and Sulaymani fiqhs.

== History ==
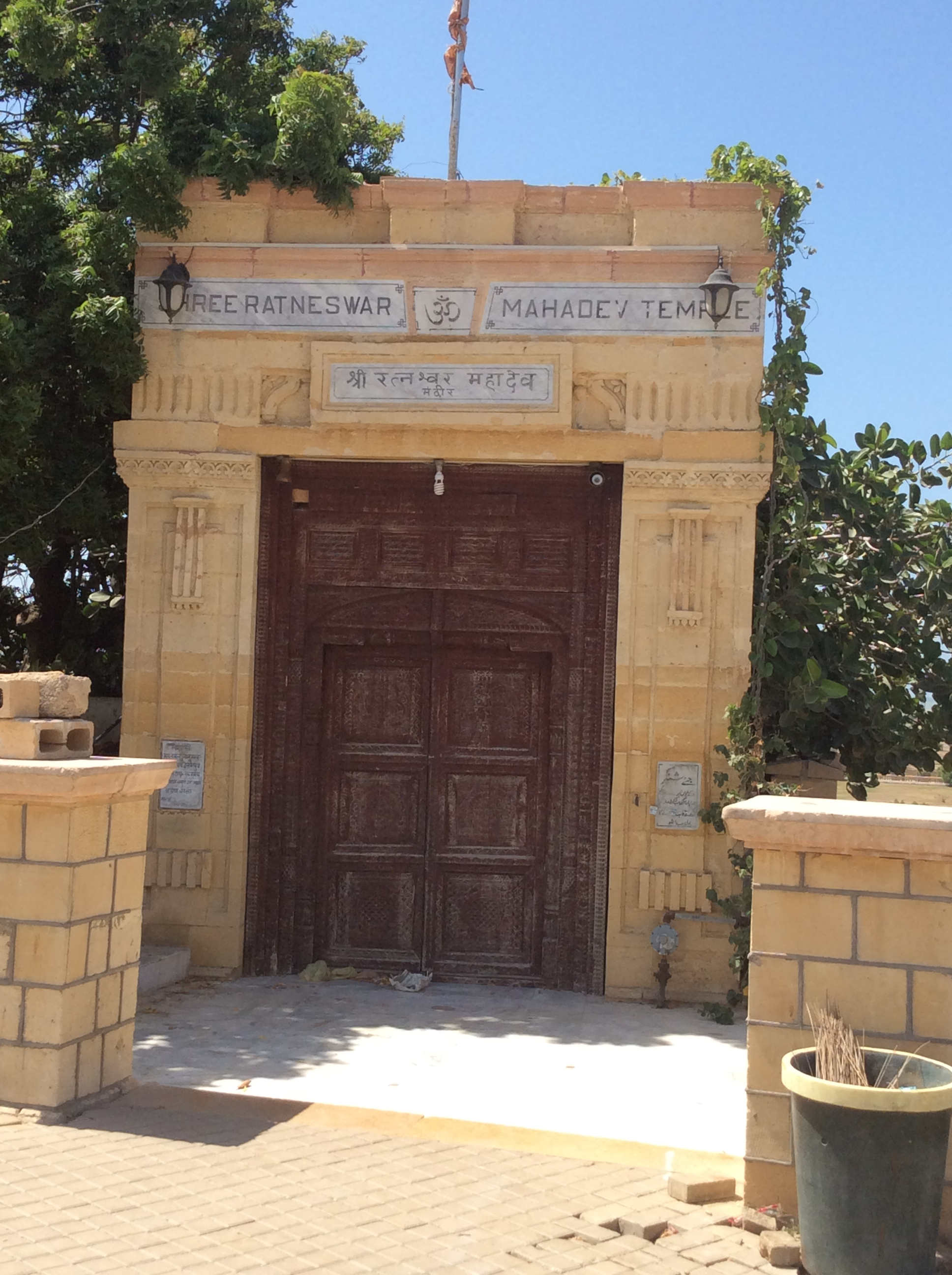
Shri Ratneshwar Mahadev Temple

=== Early ===
Till by the end of 16the century Karachi was a small fishing village of Sindhi and Balochi people when Hindu merchants from Thatta established a trading port there in the early 18th century. When the British seized control of the offshore, strategically located island of Manora in 1839, Karachi had about 10,000 inhabitants. Thereafter, authorities of the British Raj embarked on a large-scale modernisation of the city in the 19th century with the intention of establishing a major and modern port which could serve as a gateway to Punjab, the western parts of British India, and Afghanistan.

Britain's competition with imperial Russia during the Great Game also heightened the need for a modern port near Central Asia, and so Karachi prospered as a major centre of commerce and industry during the Raj, attracting communities of: Africans, Arabs, Armenians, Catholics from Goa, Jewish, Lebanese, Malays, Konkani people from Maharashtra, Kuchhi from Kuchh, Gujarat in India, and Zoroastrians (also known as Parsees) - in addition to the large number of British businessmen and colonial administrators who established the city's poshest locales, such as Clifton.

As a result, this mass migration changed the religious and cultural mosaic of Karachi; 104 years of British rule changed the demographic profile of Karachi from a collection of small predominantly Muslim fishing villages to a multicultural city.

=== 1947 Partition ===
At the time of independence, the population of the city of Karachi was 51.1% Hindu, 42.3% Muslim, with the remaining 7% primarily Christians (both British and native), Sikhs, Jains, with a small number of Jews.

The Independence of Pakistan in 1947 saw an influx of Muslim refugees from India fleeing to settle. While the original Hindu inhabitants who had stayed in Karachi since prehistoric times were persecuted or killed. Ultimately most of the Hindu population migrated to India to save their faith. Many of the Urdu-speaking and other non-Punjabi Muslim refugees that fled from various states of India settled in Karachi, wiping out the original Sindhi Hindu culture of Karachi.

Religious groups in Karachi City (1941 & 1951)
| | % (1941) | % (1951) |
|---|---|---|
| Hindu | 51.1% | 1.7% |
| Muslim | 42.3% | 96.1% |
| Christian | 2.3% | 1.6% |
| Sikh | 1.3% | N/A |
| Jain | 0.9% | N/A |
| Parsi | N/A | 0.5% |
| Other | 1.9% | 0.1% |
| Total | 100% | 100% |

== Statistics ==
Religious groups in Karachi City (1872−2023) (Note: 1872-1941: Data for the entirety of the town of Karachi, which included Karachi Municipality and Karachi Cantonment. 2017: Data for the entirety of the town of Karachi, which included the urban populations of Karachi Central District, Karachi East District, Karachi South District, Karachi West District, Malir District, and Korangi District. 2023: Data for the entirety of the town of Karachi, which included the urban populations of Karachi Central District, Karachi East District, Karachi South District, Karachi West District, Malir District, Korangi District, and Keamari District.)
| Religious group | 1872 | | 1881 | | 1891 | | 1901 | | 1911 | | 1921 | | 1931 | | 1941 | | 2017 | | 2023 | |
| Religious group | Pop. | % | Pop. | % | Pop. | % | Pop. | % | Pop. | % | Pop. | % | Pop. | % | Pop. | % | Pop. | % | Pop. | % |
|---|---|---|---|---|---|---|---|---|---|---|---|---|---|---|---|---|---|---|---|---|
| Islam | 33,018 | 55.81% | 38,946 | 52.94% | 52,957 | 50.34% | 60,003 | 51.43% | 74,075 | 48.76% | 100,436 | 46.31% | 122,847 | 46.61% | 162,447 | 42.01% | 14,382,744 | 96.63% | 18,189,474 | 96.53% |
| Hinduism | 23,157 | 39.14% | 24,617 | 33.47% | 44,503 | 42.3% | 48,169 | 41.29% | 66,038 | 43.47% | 100,683 | 46.42% | 120,595 | 45.76% | 192,831 | 49.87% | 156,452 | 1.05% | 211,138 | 1.12% |
| Christianity | 2,223 | 3.76% | 4,161 | 5.66% | 5,986 | 5.69% | 6,098 | 5.23% | 7,936 | 5.22% | 9,649 | 4.45% | 12,765 | 4.84% | 17,466 | 4.52% | 329,702 | 2.22% | 416,309 | 2.21% |
| Zoroastrianism | 748 | 1.26% | 937 | 1.27% | 1,375 | 1.31% | 1,823 | 1.56% | 2,165 | 1.43% | 2,702 | 1.25% | 3,334 | 1.26% | 3,700 | 0.96% | —N/a | —N/a | 1,435 | 0.01% |
| Judaism | 7 | 0.01% | —N/a | —N/a | 128 | 0.12% | 349 | 0.3% | 535 | 0.35% | 645 | 0.3% | 943 | 0.36% | 1,051 | 0.27% | —N/a | —N/a | —N/a | —N/a |
| Jainism | 4 | 0.01% | 9 | 0.01% | 99 | 0.09% | 125 | 0.11% | 647 | 0.43% | 1,118 | 0.52% | 629 | 0.24% | 3,214 | 0.83% | —N/a | —N/a | —N/a | —N/a |
| Tribal | 0 | 0% | —N/a | —N/a | 32 | 0.03% | 0 | 0% | 0 | 0% | 4 | 0% | 135 | 0.05% | —N/a | —N/a | —N/a | —N/a | —N/a | —N/a |
| Sikhism | 0 | 0% | —N/a | —N/a | 0 | 0% | 0 | 0% | —N/a | —N/a | 1,425 | 0.66% | 2,254 | 0.86% | 5,835 | 1.51% | —N/a | —N/a | 2,299 | 0.01% |
| Buddhism | 0 | 0% | —N/a | —N/a | 0 | 0% | 0 | 0% | —N/a | —N/a | 41 | 0.02% | 53 | 0.02% | 75 | 0.02% | —N/a | —N/a | —N/a | —N/a |
| Ahmadiyya | —N/a | —N/a | —N/a | —N/a | —N/a | —N/a | —N/a | —N/a | —N/a | —N/a | —N/a | —N/a | —N/a | —N/a | —N/a | —N/a | 8,751 | 0.06% | 7,948 | 0.04% |
| Others | 0 | 0% | 4,890 | 6.65% | 119 | 0.11% | 96 | 0.08% | 507 | 0.33% | 180 | 0.08% | 10 | 0% | 36 | 0.01% | 6,753 | 0.05% | 15,241 | 0.08% |
| Total population | 59,157 | 100% | 73,560 | 100% | 105,199 | 100% | 116,663 | 100% | 151,903 | 100% | 216,883 | 100% | 263,565 | 100% | 386,655 | 100% | 14,884,402 | 100% | 18,843,844 | 100% |

== Islam ==
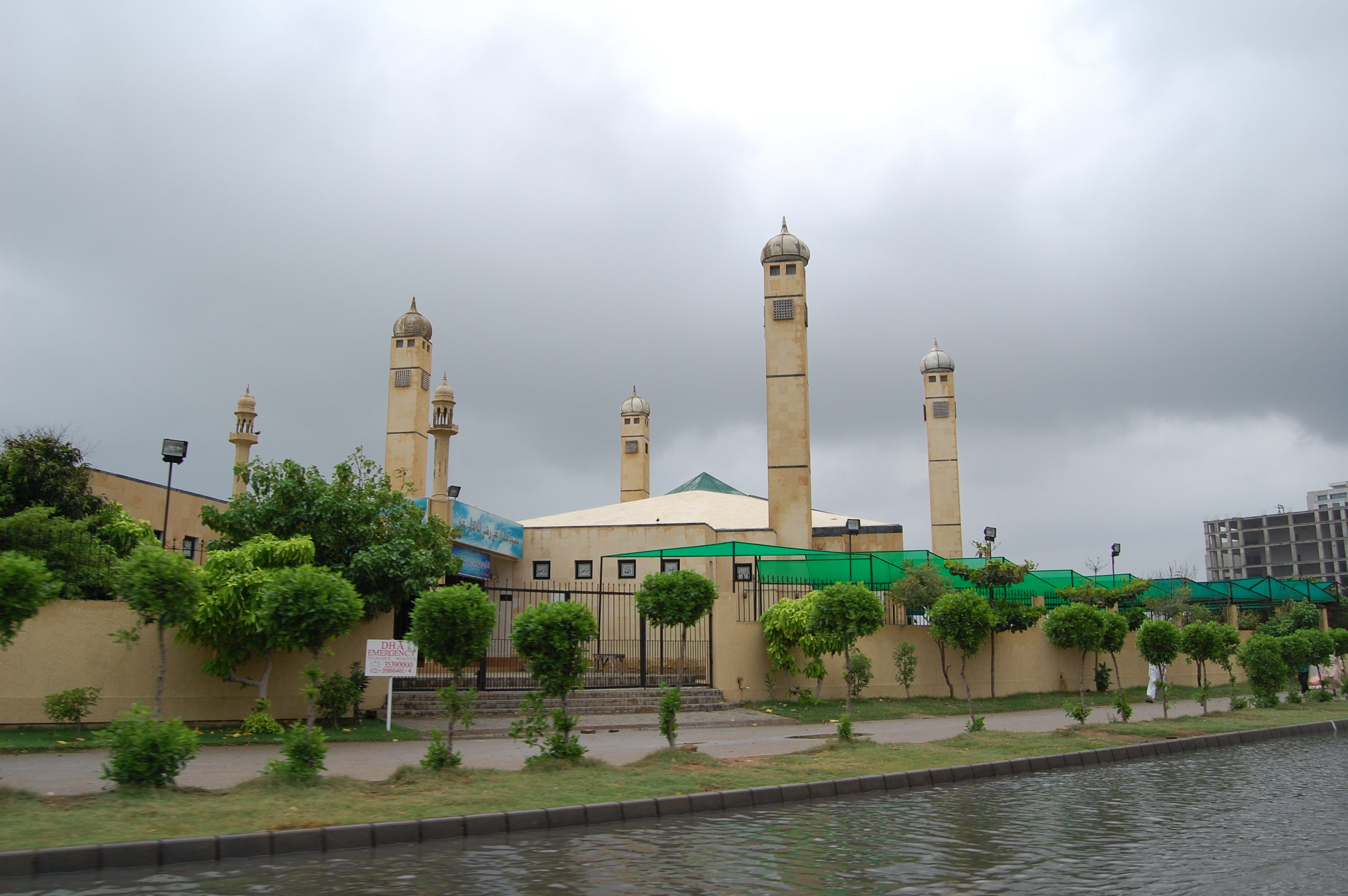
Mosque in Karachi

The state religion in Pakistan is Islam, which is practiced by about 96.52% of the city's population. Muslims are divided into two major sects: the majority of them practice Sunni Islam, while the Shias comprise an estimated 10-20%. Nearly all Pakistani Sunni Muslims belong to the Hanafi Fiqh Islamic law school. The majority of Pakistani Shia Muslims belong to the Ithnā‘Ashariyyah Islamic law school, with significant minority groups who practice Ismailism, which is composed of Nizari (Aga Khanis), Mustaali, Dawoodi Bohra, Sulaymani, and others.

There is also a small Zikri Muslim community in Karachi mostly in Lyari area.

== Hinduism ==
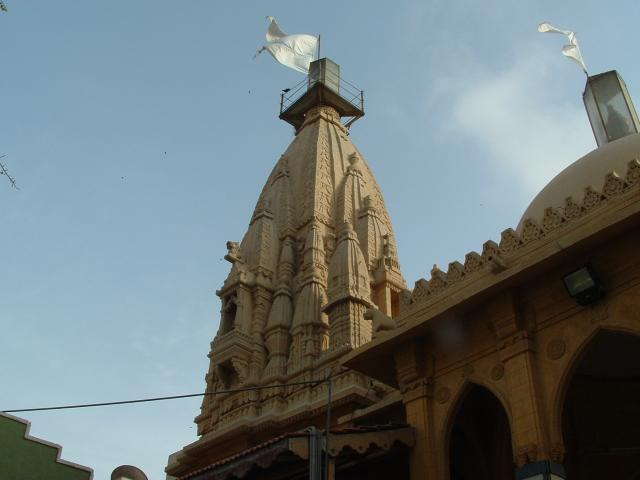
Swaminarayan Temple, the most important Hindu temple in Karachi.

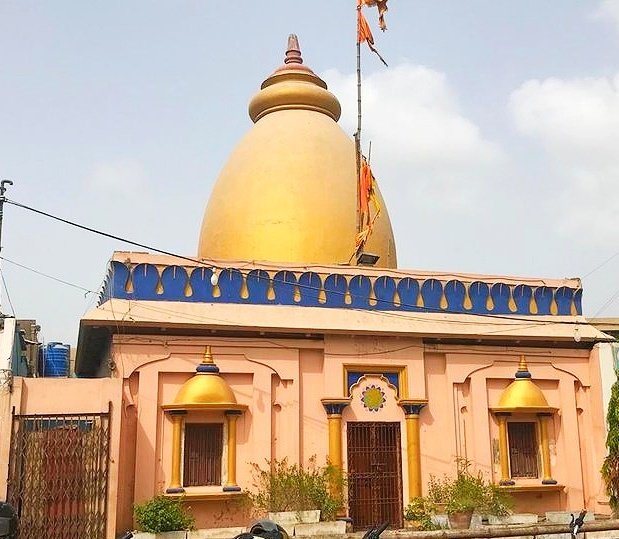
Darya Lal Mandir

Most Hindus of Karachi migrated to India during the 1947 partition and from 1948 onwards - after the establishment of Pakistan. Currently Hindus are concentrated particularly in Naraianpura, Lyari, Clifton and Saddar.

Prominent temples include the Sri Swami Narayan temple on MA Jinnah Road, Daryalal Temple in Kharadar, and numerous temples in Narainpura. Soldier Bazaar is home to a functioning Shri Panchmukhi Hanuman Temple, and Ganesh temple. Two temples function in Clifton: the Samadha Dham and Sri Ratneshwar Mahadev Temple. In Civil Lines, the Sant Satram Dham functions on School Road near Karachi Cantonment Station. Mithadar is home to the Bhagnari Shiv Temple and Devi Mata Temple. Manora is home to the Sri Varun Dev Temple.

As of the 2023 census, some 211,138 Hindus remain in Karachi, forming approximately 1.12% of the total city population. However, despite most Hindus having left Karachi, a large number of streets continue to bear Hindu names, particularly in Aram Bagh, Mithadar, and Ramswamy.

== Christianity ==
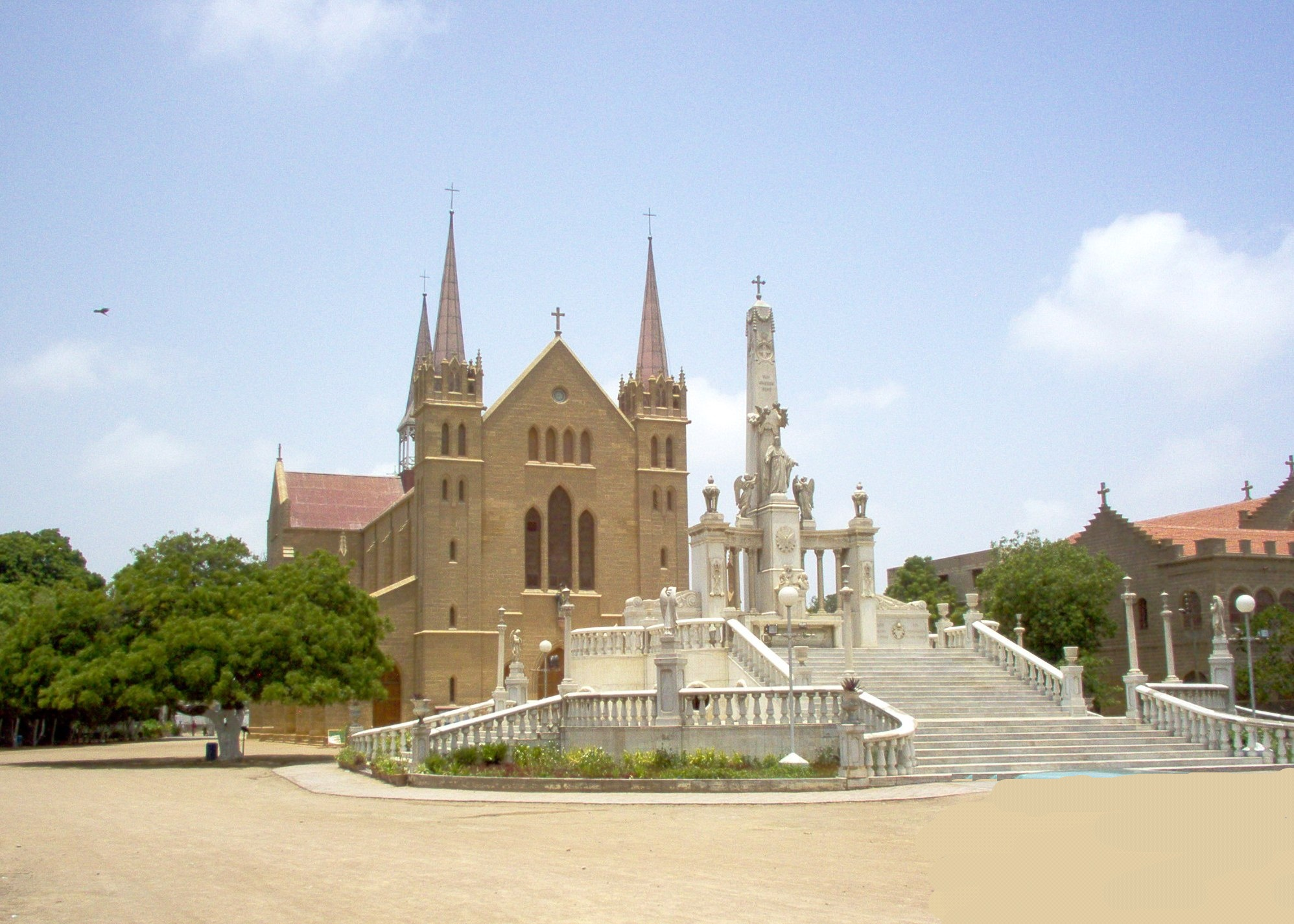
Saint Patrick's Cathedral, Karachi

The largest religious minority in Karachi are the Christians. The two major Christian ethnic groups are Goan Catholics and Punjabi Christians. The Punjabi Christians are converts from the Hindu Churas caste to Christianity during the British Raj.

== See also ==
- Demographics of Karachi
- Culture of Karachi
- Roman Catholic Archdiocese of Karachi
