= Tai (caste) =

Regions with significant populations
- India • Pakistan

Languages
- Gujarati • Sindhi • Urdu

Religion
- Islam

The Tai are a Muslim community found in the state of Gujarat in India. There is also a large diaspora in the city of Karachi in Pakistan.
