= Iffat Liaqat Ali Khan =

Pakistani politician

Iffat Liaqat Ali Khan is a Pakistani politician who was elected to the Provincial Assembly of the Punjab. She served as a member between 2008 and 2013.
