= Marwari language =

Indo-Aryan language

Marwari
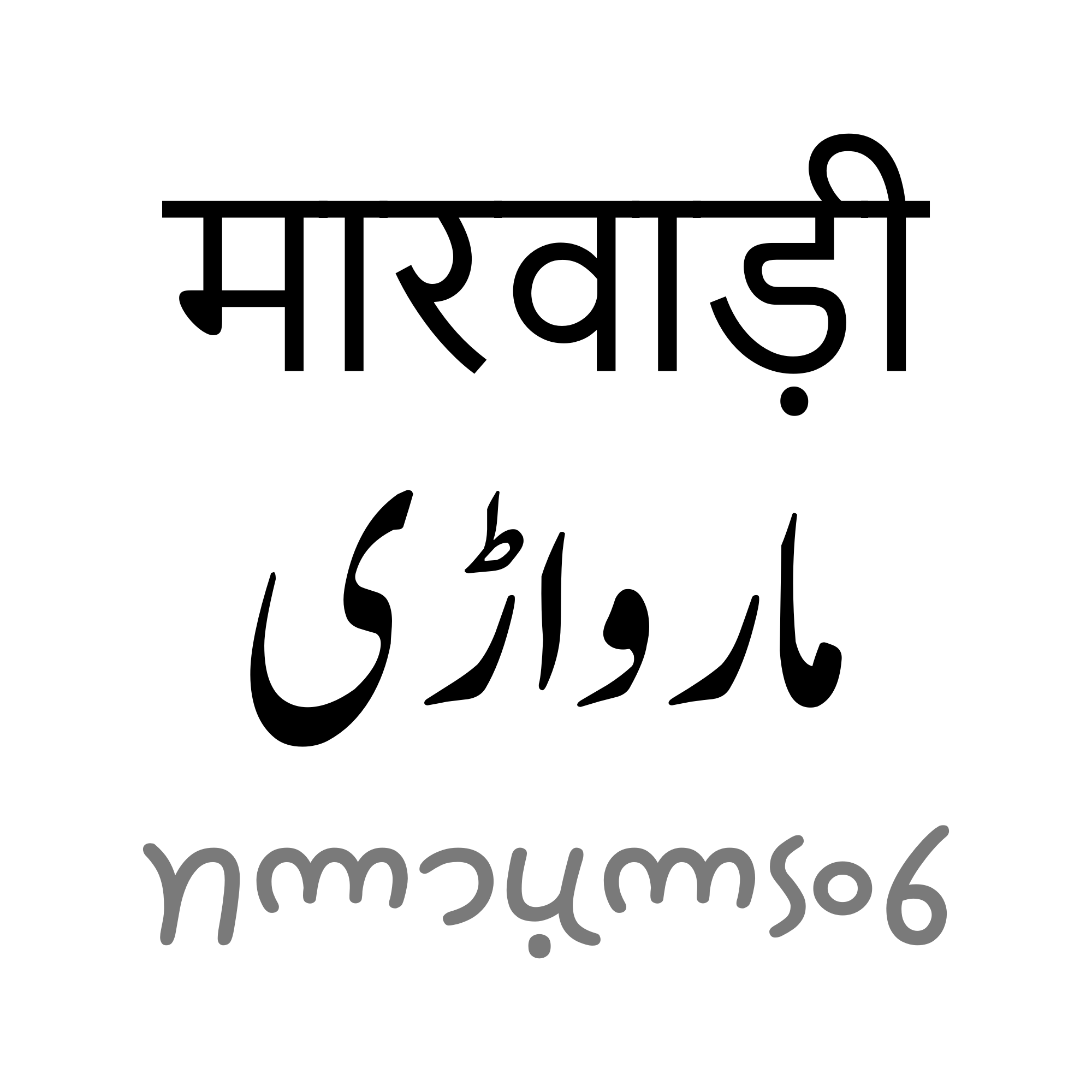
- The word Marwari written in Devanagari, Nastaliq, and Mahajani scripts
- Pronunciation: [mɑɾvɑɽi]
- Native to: India; Pakistan
- Region: Marwar
- Ethnicity: Marwari
- Native speakers: 21 million, total count (2011 census) (additional speakers counted under Hindi)
- Language family: Indo-European: Indo-Iranian; Indo-Aryan; Western; Rajasthani; Marwari
- Writing system: Devanagari (in India); Nastaliq (in Pakistan); Mahajani (historical)

Language codes
- ISO 639-2: mwr
- ISO 639-3: mwr – inclusive code Individual codes: rwr – Marwari (India) mve – Bahawali wry – Merwari
- Glottolog: None raja1256 scattered in Rajasthani
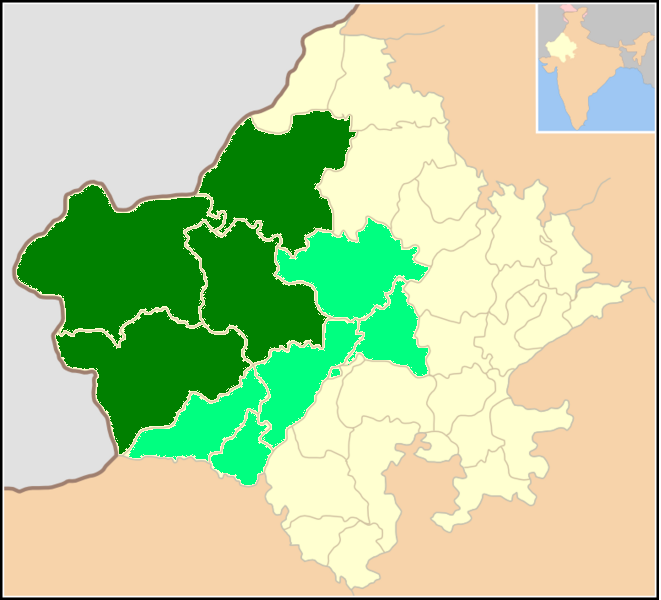
- Dark green indicates Marwari speaking home area in Rajasthan, light green indicates additional dialect areas where speakers identify their language as Marwari.

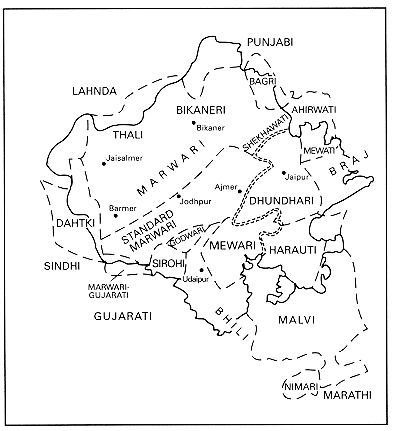
Geographical distribution of Rajasthani languages

A man speaking Marwari.

Marwari (मारवाड़ी, مارواڑی, Mārwāṛī, IPA: [maɾwaɽi]) (Note: also rendered as Marwadi or Marvadi) is a Western Indo-Aryan language belonging to the Indo-Iranian subdivision of the Indo-European languages. Marwari and its closely related varieties like Dhundhari, Shekhawati and Mewari form a part of the broader Rajasthani language family. It is spoken in the Indian state of Rajasthan, as well as the neighbouring states of Gujarat and Haryana, some adjacent areas in eastern parts of Pakistan, and some migrant communities in Nepal. There are two dozen varieties of Marwari.

Marwari is popularly written in Devanagari script, as are many languages of India and Nepal, including Hindi, Marathi, Nepali, and Sanskrit; although it was historically written in Mahajani, it is still written in the Perso-Arabic script by the Marwari minority in Eastern parts of Pakistan (the standard/western Naskh script variant is used in Sindh Province, and the eastern Nastalik variant is used in Punjab Province), where it has educational status but where it is rapidly shifting to Urdu.

Marwari has no official status in India and is not used as a language of education. Marwari is still spoken widely in Jodhpur, Pali, Jaisalmer, Barmer, Nagaur, and Bikaner. It is also one of the most common languages spoken by Indians in Kenya.

== History ==
It is believed that Marwari and Gujarati evolved from Old Western Rajasthani or Dingal. Formal grammar of Gurjar Apabhraṃśa was written by Jain monk and Gujarati scholar Hemachandra Suri.

== Geographical distribution ==
Marwari is primarily spoken in the Indian state of Rajasthan. Marwari speakers have dispersed widely throughout India and other countries but are found most notably in the neighbouring state of Gujarat and in Eastern Pakistan. Speakers are also found in Bhopal. With around 7.9 million speakers in India according to the 2001 census.

Some dialects of Marwari are:

Marwari dialects
Dialect	Spoken in
Thali/Bikaneri	Bikaner, Jaisalmer, Phalodi, Balotra districts
Godwari	Jalore, Sirohi, Sanchore, Pali districts
Goaria	Eastern Sindh
Standard Marwari	Ajmer, Beawer, Jodhpur, Kekri, Nagore

== Lexis ==
Indian Marwari [rwr] in Rajasthan shares a 50%–65% lexical similarity with Hindi (this is based on a Swadesh 210 word list comparison). It has many cognate words with Hindi. Notable phonetic correspondences include /s/ in Hindi with /h/ in Marwari. For example, /sona/ 'gold' (Hindi) and /hono/ 'gold' (Marwari).

Pakistani Marwari [mve] shares 87% lexical similarity between its Southern subdialects in Sindh (Utradi, Jaxorati, and Larecha) and Northern subdialects in Punjab (Uganyo, Bhattipo, and Khadali), 79%–83% with Dhakti [mki], and 78% with Meghwar and Bhat Marwari dialects. Mutual intelligibility of Pakistani Marwari [mve] with Indian Marwari [rwr] is decreasing due to the rapid shift of active speakers in Pakistan to Urdu, their use of the Arabic script and different sources of support medias, and their separation from Indian Marwaris, even if there are some educational efforts to keep it active (but absence of official recognition by Pakistani or provincial government level). Many words have been borrowed from other Pakistani languages.

Merwari [wry] shares 82%–97% intelligibility of Pakistani Marwari [mve], with 60%–73% lexical similarity between Merwari varieties in Ajmer and Nagaur districts, but only 58%–80% with Shekhawati [swv], 49%–74% with Indian Marwari [rwr], 44%–70% with Godwari [gdx], 54%–72% with Mewari [mtr], 62%–70% with Dhundari [dhd], 57%–67% with Haroti [hoj]. Unlike Pakistani Marwari [mve], the use of Merwari remains vigorous, even if its most educated speakers also proficiently speak Hindi [hin].

Marwari Dialects Comparison
Dialect	Lexical Similarity with Hindi	Phonetic Correspondences
Indian Marwari [rwr]	50%–65%	Notable: /s/ in Hindi → /h/ in Marwari (e.g., /sona/ 'gold' → /hono/ 'gold')
Pakistani Marwari [mve]	87% (Southern Sindh) / 79%–83% (Dhakti [mki]) / 78% (Meghwar, Bhat Marwari)	Mutual intelligibility decreasing due to shifts in Pakistan
Merwari [wry]	82%–97% (with Pakistani Marwari [mve]) / 60%–73% (Ajmer, Nagaur)	58%–80% (Shekhawati [swv]) / 49%–74% (Indian Marwari [rwr]) / 44%–70% (Godwari [gdx]) / 54%–72% (Mewari [mtr]) / 62%–70% (Dhundari [dhd]) / 57%–67% (Haroti [hoj])
Merwari [wry] vs. Pakistani Marwari [mve]	Intelligibility: 82%–97%	
Merwari [wry] vs. Indian Marwari [rwr]	Intelligibility: 49%–74%	
Merwari [wry] vs. Shekhawati [swv]	Intelligibility: 58%–80%	
Merwari [wry] vs. Godwari [gdx]	Intelligibility: 44%–70%	
Merwari [wry] vs. Mewari [mtr]	Intelligibility: 54%–72%	
Merwari [wry] vs. Dhundari [dhd]	Intelligibility: 62%–70%	
Merwari [wry] vs. Haroti [hoj]	Intelligibility: 57%–67%	

== Phonology ==
Vowels
	Front	Central	Back
Close	i		u
Close	ɪ		ʊ
Mid	e	ə	o
Mid	ɛ	ə	ɔ
Open		ä	

- Nasalization of vowels is phonemic, all of the vowels can be nasalized.
- Diphthongs are /ai, ia, ae, əi, ei, oi, ui, ua, uo/

Consonants
		Labial	Dental/ Alveolar	Retroflex	Post-alv/ Palatal	Velar	Glottal
Nasal		m	n	ɳ		ŋ	
Plosive/ Affricate	voiceless	p	t	ʈ	t͡ɕ	k	
Plosive/ Affricate	aspirated	pʰ	tʰ	ʈʰ	t͡ɕʰ	kʰ	
Plosive/ Affricate	voiced	b	d	ɖ	d͡ʑ	ɡ	
Plosive/ Affricate	breathy	bʱ	dʱ	ɖʱ	d͡ʑʱ	ɡʱ	
Plosive/ Affricate	implosive	ɓ	ɗ				
Fricative			s				h
Sonorant	rhotic		r	ɽ			
Sonorant	lateral	w	l	ɭ	j		

- Implosives are mostly only found word initially and it formed due to the influence of neighbouring languages.
- /w/ is [ʋ] before front vowels and [w] elsewhere e.g. [ʋɪwwa] 'marriage'.
- Younis Kashali mentions aspirated implosives, fricatives and sonorants.

== Morphology ==
Marwari languages have a structure that is quite similar to Hindustani (Hindi or Urdu). Their primary word order is subject–object–verb. Most of the pronouns and interrogatives used in Marwari are distinct from those used in Hindi; at least Marwari proper and Harauti have a clusivity distinction in their plural pronouns.

== Vocabulary ==
Marwari vocabulary is somewhat similar to other Western Indo-Aryan languages, especially Rajasthani and Gujarati, however, elements of grammar and basic terminology differ enough to significantly impede mutual intelligibility.

Word List

Swadesh 100-word list with Marwari translations and IPA transcriptions, illustrating core vocabulary for linguistic comparison and historical linguistics.

Sr. No.	Marwari Meaning	IPA	English Word
1	हूं	/hũː/	I
2	थूं	/tʰũː/	you (singular)
3	आपां	/aːpãː/	we
4	औ	/oː/	this
5	वौ	/voː/	that
6	कुण	/kʊɳ/	who
7	कांई	/kãːiː/	what
8	कोनी	/koniː/	not
9	सगळौ	/səgᵊɭoː/	all
10	घणौ	/ɡʰəɳoː/	many
11	अेक	/eːk/	one
12	बे	/beː/	two
13	मोटौ	/moʈoː/	big
14	लांबौ	/laːmboː/	long
15	नैनौ	/nɛnoː/	small
16	लुगाई	/lʊɡaːiː/	woman
17	मोट्यार	/moʈjaːr/	man (adult male)
18	मिनख	/minakʰ/	person
19	माछली	/maːtʃʰᵊliː/	fish
20	चीड़ी	/tʃiːɖiː/	bird
21	गिंॸक	/ɡinɖək/	dog
22	जूं	/dʒũː/	louse
23	रूंख	/ɾũːkʰ/	tree
24	बीज	/biːdʒ/	seed
25	पांनडौ	/pãːnəɽoː/	leaf
26	जड़	/dʒəɽ/	root
27	छाल	/tʃʰaːl/	bark (of a tree)
28	चांमडी	/tʃaːmᵊɽiː/	skin
29	मांस	/mãːs/	meat
30	लोही	/lohiː/	blood
31	हाॸ्ॸी	/ɦaːɖːiː/	bone
32	चरबी	/tʃəɾᵊbiː/	grease
33	अंडौ	/əɳɖoː/	egg
34	सींग	/siːŋ/	horn
35	पूंछ	/pũːtʃʰ/	tail
36	पांख	/pãːkʰ/	feather
37	केस	/keːs/	hair
38	माथौ	/maːtʰoː/	head
39	कांन	/kãːn/	ear
40	नैण	/nɛːɳ/	eye
41	नाक	/naːk/	nose
42	मुंॸौ	/mʊɳɖɔː/	mouth
43	दांत	/dãːt/	tooth
44	जीभ	/dʒiːbʰ/	tongue
45	नूं	/nũː/	fingernail
46	पग	/pəɡ/	foot
47	टांग	/ʈaːŋ/	leg
48	गोॸ्ॸौ	/ɡoɖːoː/	knee
49	हाथ	/ɦaːt̪ʰ/	hand
50	पांखडौ	/pãːkʰədoː/	wing
51	पेट	/peːʈ/	belly
52	आंतडी	/ãːtᵊɽiː/	guts
53	नाड	/naːɽ/	neck
54	पीठ	/piːʈʰ/	back
55	छाती	/tʃʰaːt̪iː/	breast
56	हिवडौ	/ɦɪʋᵊɽoː/	heart
57	काळजौ	/kaːɭədʒoː/	liver
58	पीणौ	/piːɳoː/	to drink
59	खाणौ	/kʰaːɳoː/	to eat
60	करडणौ	/kəɾəɽᵊɳoː/	to bite
61	जोवणौ	/dʒoʋᵊɳoː/	to see
62	सांभळणौ	/sãːbʰəɭᵊɳoː/	to hear
63	जांणणौ	/dʒãːɳᵊɳoː/	to know
64	सूवणौ	/suːʋᵊɳoː/	to sleep
65	मरणौ	/məɾᵊɳoː/	to die
66	मारणौ	/maːɾᵊɳoː/	to kill
67	तिरणौ	/tɪɾᵊɳoː/	to swim
68	उॸणौ	/ʊɖᵊɳoː/	to fly (verb)
69	चालणौ	/tʃaːlᵊɳoː/	to walk
70	आवणौ	/aːʋᵊɳoː/	to come
71	पसरणौ	/pəsəɾᵊɳoː/	to lie (down)
72	बैठणौ	/bɛːʈʰᵊɳoː/	to sit
73	ऊभणौ	/uːbʰᵊɳoː/	to stand
74	दैणौ	/dɛːɳoː/	to give
75	कहणौ	/kɛːʰɳɔː/	to say
76	सूरज	/suːɾədʒ/	sun
77	चंदौ	/tʃəndoː/	moon
78	तारौ	/taːɾoː/	star
79	पांणी	/pãːɳiː/	water
80	मेह	/meʰ/	rain
81	नदी	/nədiː/	river
82	तळाव	/təɭaːʋ/	lake
83	दरियौ	/dəɾɪjoː/	sea
84	लूण	/luːɳ/	salt
85	भाटौ	/bʰaːʈoː/	stone
86	रेत	/ɾeːt̪/	sand
87	धूळ	/dʰuːɭ/	dust
88	धरती	/dʰəɾᵊtiː/	earth
89	बादळ	/baːdəɭ/	cloud
90	धूंऔ	/dʰũːoː/	smoke
91	वासदी	/ʋaːsədiː/	fire
92	राख	/ɾaːkʰ/	ash
93	बळणौ	/bəɭᵊɳoː/	burn
94	सडक	/səɽək/	road
95	ॸूंगर	/duːŋɡəɾ/	mountain
96	रातौ	/ɾaːtoː/	red
97	लीलौ	/liːloː/	green
98	पीळौ	/piːɭoː/	yellow
99	धौळौ	/doːɭoː/	white
100	काळौ	/kaːɭoː/	black

== Writing system ==
Marwari is generally written in the Devanagari script, although the Mahajani script is traditionally associated with the language. In Pakistan, it is written in the Perso-Arabic script with modifications. Historical Marwari orthography for Devanagari uses other characters in place of standard Devanagari letters.

=== Mahajani Script ===
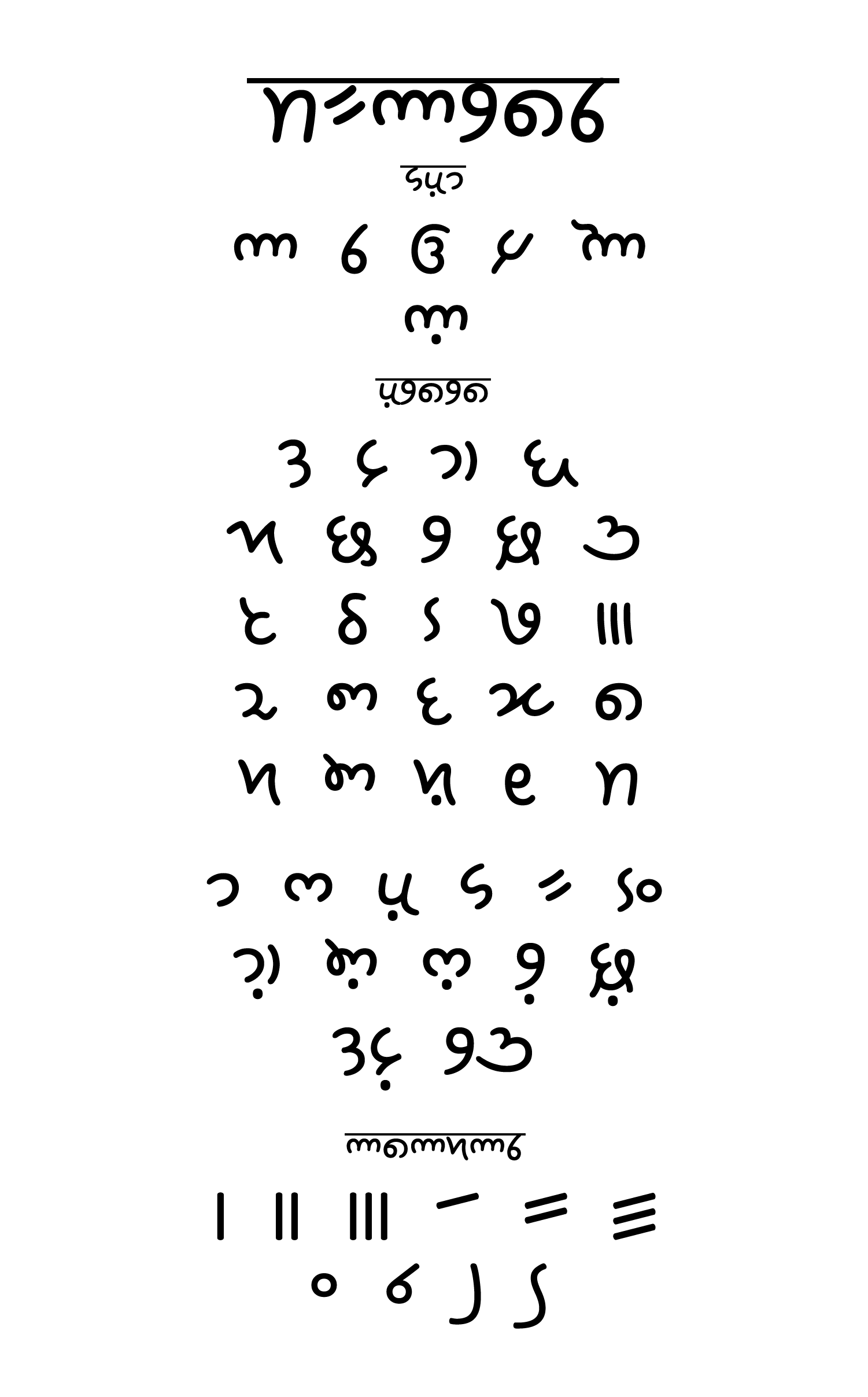
Mahajani Varnamala chart with the last two rows consisting of Indic fraction symbols

The word "Mahajani" written in Mahajani script (Long and short vowels are not distinguished).

The Mahajani script is a Laṇḍā script used primarily for mercantile purposes and contains extensive written material in the form of financial ledgers, records and accounts. It is written left to right and has fewer vowels than most North Indian scripts. Their use is optional, with the reader inferring the sounds from context.

Marwari Mahajani alphabet
Vowels
𑅐 a, ā IPA: [ɐ], [ɑː]	𑅑 i, ī IPA: [i], [iː]	𑅒 u, ū IPA: [u], [uː]	𑅓 e/ē, ai IPA: [eː], [ɑj]	𑅔 o/ō, au IPA: [oː], [ɑw]
Consonants
𑅕 ka IPA: [k]	𑅖 kha IPA: [kʰ]	𑅗 ga IPA: [ɡ]	𑅘 gha IPA: [ɡʱ]	
𑅙 ca IPA: [tʃ]	𑅚 cha IPA: [tʃʰ]	𑅛 ja IPA: [dʒ]	𑅜 jha IPA: [dʒʱ]	𑅝 ña IPA: [ɲ]
𑅞 ṭa IPA: [ʈ]	𑅟 ṭha IPA: [ʈʰ]	𑅠 ḍa IPA: [ɖ]	𑅡 ḍha IPA: [ɖʱ]	𑅢 ṇa IPA: [ɳ]
𑅣 ta IPA: [t̪]	𑅤 tha IPA: [t̪ʰ]	𑅥 da IPA: [d̪]	𑅦 dha IPA: [d̪ʱ]	𑅧 na IPA: [n]
𑅨 pa IPA: [p]	𑅩 pha IPA: [pʰ]	𑅪 ba IPA: [b]	𑅫 bha IPA: [bʱ]	𑅬 ma IPA: [m]
𑅭 ra IPA: [r]	𑅮 la IPA: [l]	𑅯 va IPA: [ʋ]	𑅰 sa IPA: [s]	𑅱 ha IPA: [ɦ]

=== Perso-Arabic Script ===
Marwari Perso-Arabic alphabet
Perso-Arabic (Devanagari) (Latin) [IPA]	ا ‌(आ, ा) (ā) [∅]/[ʔ]/[aː]	ب ‌(ब) (b) [b]	بھ ‌(भ) (bh) [bʱ]	ٻ ‌(ॿ) (b̤) [ɓ]	ٻھ ‌(ॿ़) (b̤h) [ɓʱ]	پ ‌(प) (p) [p]
Perso-Arabic (Devanagari) (Latin) [IPA]	پھ ‌(फ) (ph) [pʰ]	ت ‌(त) (t) [t̪]	تھ ‌(थ) (th) [t̪ʰ]	ٹ ‌(ट) (ṭ) [ʈ]	ٹھ ‌(ठ) (ṭh) [ʈʰ]	ث ‌(स) (s) [s]
Perso-Arabic (Devanagari) (Latin) [IPA]	ج ‌(ज) (j) [d͡ʒ]	جھ ‌(झ) (jh) [d͡ʒʱ]	چ ‌(च) (c) [t͡ʃ]	چھ ‌(छ) (ch) [t͡ʃʰ]	ح ‌(ह) (h) [h]	خ ‌(ख) (kh) [kʰ] ([x])
Perso-Arabic (Devanagari) (Latin) [IPA]	د ‌(द) (d) [d̪]	دھ ‌(ध) (dh) [d̪ʱ]	ڈ ‌(ड) (ḍ) [ɖ]	ڈھ ‌(ढ) (ḍh) [ɖʱ]	ذ ‌(ज़) (z) [z]	ڏ ‌(ॾ) (d̤) [ᶑ]
Perso-Arabic (Devanagari) (Latin) [IPA]	ڏھ ‌(ॾ़) (d̤h) [ᶑʱ]	ر ‌(र) (r) [r]	رؕ ‌(ड़) (ṛ) [ɽ]	رؕھ ‌(ढ़) (ṛh) [ɽʱ]	ز ‌(ज़) (z) [z]	زھ ‌(ॼ़) (zh) [zʱ]
Perso-Arabic (Devanagari) (Latin) [IPA]	ژ ‌(झ़) (zh) [ʒ]	س ‌(स) (s) [s]	سھ ‌(स्ह) (sh) [sʰ]	ش ‌(श) (ś) [ʃ]	شھ ‌(श्ह) (śh) [ʃʰ]	ݾ ‌(ष) (x) [χ]
Perso-Arabic (Devanagari) (Latin) [IPA]	ݾھ ‌(ष्ह) (xh) [χʰ]	ص ‌(स) (s) [s]	ض ‌(ज़) (z) [z]	ط ‌(त) (t) [t̪]	ظ ‌(ज़) (z) [z]	ع ‌(ॽ) ( ’ ) [ʔ]
Perso-Arabic (Devanagari) (Latin) [IPA]	غ ‌(ग़) (ġ) [ɣ] ([gʱ])	ف ‌(फ़) (f) [f] ([pʰ])	ق ‌(क़) (q) [q] ([k])	ک ‌(क) (k) [k]	کھ ‌(ख) (kh) [kʰ]	گ ‌(ग) (g) [k]
Perso-Arabic (Devanagari) (Latin) [IPA]	گھ ‌(घ) (gh) [gʱ]	ل ‌(ल) (l) [l]	لھ ‌(ल़ / ल्ह) (lh) [lʰ]	ݪ ‌(ळ) (ḷ) [ɭ]	ݪھ ‌(ऴ / ळ्ह) (ḷh) [ɭʰ]	م ‌(म) (m) [m]
Perso-Arabic (Devanagari) (Latin) [IPA]	مھ ‌(म़ / म्ह) (mh) [mʰ]	ن ‌(न, ङ) (n, ṅ) [n]/[ŋ]	نھ ‌(ऩ / न्ह) (nh) [nʰ]	ن٘ـ ں ‌(ं) (◌̃) [◌̃]	ݨ ‌(ण) (ṇ) [ɳ]	ݨھ ‌(ण़ / ण्ह) (ṇh) [ɳʰ]
Perso-Arabic (Devanagari) (Latin) [IPA]	و ‌(व) (w) [ʋ]	ہ ‌(ह) (h) [h]	ی ‌(ए, ई, े, ी) (e, ī) [j]/[e]/[iː]	ے ‌(ए, े) (e) [e]		

Marwari Perso-Arabic vowels
Final	Middle	Initial	Devanagari Initial	Devanagari Diacritic	Latin	IPA
ـہ	ـَ	اَ	अ	-	a	[ə]
ـَا / یٰ	ـَا	آ	आ	ा	ā	[aː]
N/A	ـِ	اِ	इ	ि	i	[ɪ]
ـِى	ـِيـ	اِی	ई	ी	ī	[iː]
ـے	ـيـ	اے	ए, ऎ	ॆ, े	e	[eː]
ـَے	ـَيـ	اَے	ऐ	ै	ai	[ɛː]
N/A	ـُ	اُ	उ	ु	u	[ʊ]
ـُو		اُو	ऊ	ू	ū	[uː]
ـو		او	ओ	ो	ō	[oː]
ـَو		اَو	औ	ौ	au	[ɔː]

== Sample Texts ==
Below is a sample text in Marwari, in standard Devanagari Script, and transliterated into Latin as per ISO 15919.

Devanagari Script	Mahajani Script	ISO 15919 Latin	English
सगळा मिणख नै गौरव अन अधिकारों रे रासे मांय जळम सूं स्वतंत्रता अने समानता प्राप्त छे। वणी रे गोड़े बुध्दि अन अंतरआत्मा री प्राप्ती छे अन वणी ने भैईपाळा भावना सू एकबीजे रे सारू वर्तन करणो जोयीजै छे।	𑅰𑅗𑅮𑅳𑅐 𑅬𑅑𑅢𑅖 𑅧𑅑 𑅗𑅒𑅭𑅯 𑅐𑅧 𑅐𑅦𑅑𑅕𑅐𑅭𑅔𑅧 𑅭𑅓 𑅭𑅐𑅰𑅓 𑅬𑅐𑅧𑅛 𑅛𑅮𑅳𑅬 𑅰𑅒𑅧 𑅰𑅯𑅣𑅧𑅣𑅭𑅣𑅐 𑅐𑅧𑅓 𑅰𑅬𑅐𑅧𑅣𑅐 𑅨𑅭𑅐𑅨𑅣 𑅚𑅓। 𑅯𑅢𑅑 𑅭𑅓 𑅗𑅔𑅲𑅓 𑅪𑅒𑅦𑅥𑅑 𑅐𑅧 𑅐𑅧𑅣𑅭𑅐𑅣𑅬𑅐 𑅭𑅑 𑅨𑅭𑅐𑅨𑅣𑅑 𑅚𑅓 𑅐𑅧 𑅯𑅢𑅑 𑅧𑅓 𑅫𑅑𑅑𑅨𑅐𑅮𑅳𑅐 𑅫𑅐𑅯𑅧𑅐 𑅰𑅒 𑅓𑅕𑅪𑅑𑅛𑅓 𑅭𑅓 𑅰𑅐𑅭𑅒 𑅯𑅭𑅣𑅧 𑅕𑅭𑅢𑅔 𑅛𑅔𑅛𑅑𑅛𑅑 𑅚𑅓।	Sagḷā miṇakh nai gaurav an adhikārõ re rāse māy jaḷam sū̃ svatantrā ane samāntā prāpt che. Vaṇī re goṛe buddhi an antarātmā rī prāptī che an vaṇī ne bhaiīpāḷā bhāvnā sū ekbīje re sārū vartan karṇo joyījai che.	All human beings are born free and equal in dignity and rights. They are endowed with reason and conscience and should act towards one another in a spirit of brotherhood.

== See also ==
- Hadauti
- Lambadi
- List of Indian languages by total speakers
- Marwari Muslims
- Marwari people
- Shekhawati
