= Liaqat Ali (cricketer) =

Pakistani cricketer (born 1955)

Personal information
- Full name: Liaqat Ali Khan
- Born: 21 May 1955 (age 71); Karachi, Pakistan
- Batting: Right-handed
- Bowling: Left-arm medium-fast

International information
- National side: Pakistan (1975–1978)
- Test debut (cap 70): 1 March 1975 v West Indies
- Last Test: 15 June 1978 v England
- ODI debut (cap 20): 23 December 1977 v England
- Last ODI: 26 May 1978 v England

Career statistics
Competition	Test	ODI	First-class	List A
Matches	5	3	173	49
Runs scored	28	7	746	16
Batting average	7.00	7.00	7.69	2.28
100s/50s	0/0	0/0	0/1	0/0
Top score	12	7	51	7
Balls bowled	808	188	24754	2259
Wickets	6	2	489	57
Bowling average	59.83	55.50	25.63	25.26
5 wickets in innings	0	0	24	0
10 wickets in match	0	0	2	0
Best bowling	3/80	1/41	8/44	4/42
Catches/stumpings	1/–	0/–	65/–	6/–
- Source: ESPNCricinfo, 5 July 2026

Liaqat Ali Khan (born 21 May 1955) is a Pakistani former cricketer. Ali is a right-handed batsman who bowls left-arm medium-fast. He was born in Karachi, Sindh, and is the brother of cricketer Riasat Ali.

Ali made his first-class debut for Karachi Blues in the 1970/71 Pakistani season. He made his List A debut for Sind in the 1975/76 season. He made his Test debut for Pakistan against the West Indies at Karachi on 1 March 1975, and made his ODI debut against England at Sahiwal on 23 December 1977.

During his domestic career, Ali represented Karachi Blues, Sind, Karachi, Karachi Whites and Habib Bank Limited. He also played for Pakistan International Airlines.

Ali played five Tests and three ODIs for Pakistan between 1975 and 1978. His best figures in Test cricket were 3 wickets for 80 runs, which came in his final Test against England at Lord's in June 1978.

In all first-class cricket, Ali played 173 matches between the 1970/71 and 1990/91 seasons and took 489 wickets at an average of 25.63, including 24 five-wicket hauls and two ten-wicket matches. His best first-class bowling figures were 8 wickets for 44 runs, while his best List A figures were 4 wickets for 42 runs.
