= Liaqat Ali Bangulzai =

Pakistani politician

Liaquat Ali Bangulzai
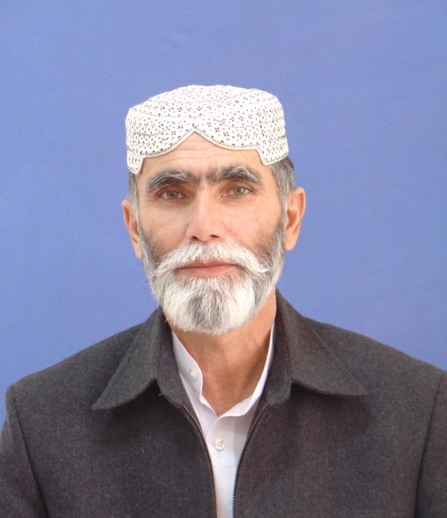

Member of the Senate of Pakistan
- In office February 2003 – September 2014

Personal details
- Born: Mastung District, Baluchistan, Pakistan
- Party: Jamiat Ulema-e-Islam (F)
- Children: 8
- Education: University of Balochistan
- Occupation: Politician, writer
- Profession: Columnist

Liaquat Ali Bangulzai (Brahvi, Balochi, Urdu, Persian: لیاقت علی بنگلزئ) was a Pakistani Senator. He was born in District Mastung in Baluchistan. He started his early education from Govt. Pilot Secondary School Mastung. He then graduated from Govt. Degree College Mastung in 1977. and further in 1989 he did his master's degree in philosophy from University of Baluchistan, Quetta. He also received an Arabic Language Diploma from Imam Ali School, Bahrain.

== Political career ==
He started his political career in 1974 by joining JUI(F). He had remained a very active member and leader of JUI(F). He has always struggled for the strengthen of democracy and he believes that the solution of every problem in the Islamic republic of Pakistan is the implementation of Islamic laws. He believes in the constitution of 1973 which was signed by his great leader late Maulana Mufti Mehmood. He has remained Provincial Information Secretary of JUI(F) and remained general secretary and president of JUI(F) Mastung, Baluchistan. Mr. Liaquat Ali was elected as Councilor of Mastung Municipal committee with responsibility for Finance, Economic Affairs, Planning & Development in October, 1996. He was selected as the District Chairman, (Zakat), Mastung District. Then the Secretary of Provincial Zakat declared him as the Chairman Zakat of the year 1997 from Baluchistan.

In February 2003 he contested in the Senate election and was elected as a senator. He remained senator since March 2009. He was also the chairman of Senate Standing Committee on Information & Broadcasting. The chairman of the Senate acknowledged him as the "soft spoken senator of the tenure (2003-2009)"

== Columnist ==
Liaquat Ali Bangulzai was a writer and columnist in different leading newspapers of Pakistan. He had been a member of the board of governors i.e. "Taleem Foundation" Anjuman-e-Dabistan Bolan (Literacy Club) in October, 1992.

== Death ==
Liaqat Ali Bangulzai died on 1 September 2014, and left behind a wife, five sons and three daughters.
