= Liaqat Ali Khan (Mutlan politician) =

Pakistani politician

Member of the National Assembly of Pakistan
- In office 2008–2013
- Constituency: NA-152 (Multan-V)

Nawab Liaquat Ali Khan is a Pakistani politician who had been a member of the National Assembly of Pakistan from 2008 to 2013.

== Political career ==
He ran for the seat of the National Assembly of Pakistan from Constituency NA-152 (Multan-V) as a candidate of Pakistan Muslim League (Q) (PML-Q) but was unsuccessful. He received 36,335 votes and lost the seat to Assad Murtaza Gilani.

He was elected to the National Assembly from Constituency NA-152 (Multan-V) as a candidate of Pakistan Peoples Party (PPP) in the 2008 Pakistani general election. He received 47,880 votes and defeated Syed Mujahid Ali Shah, a candidate of PML-Q.
