= Marathi Muslims =

Ethnic group

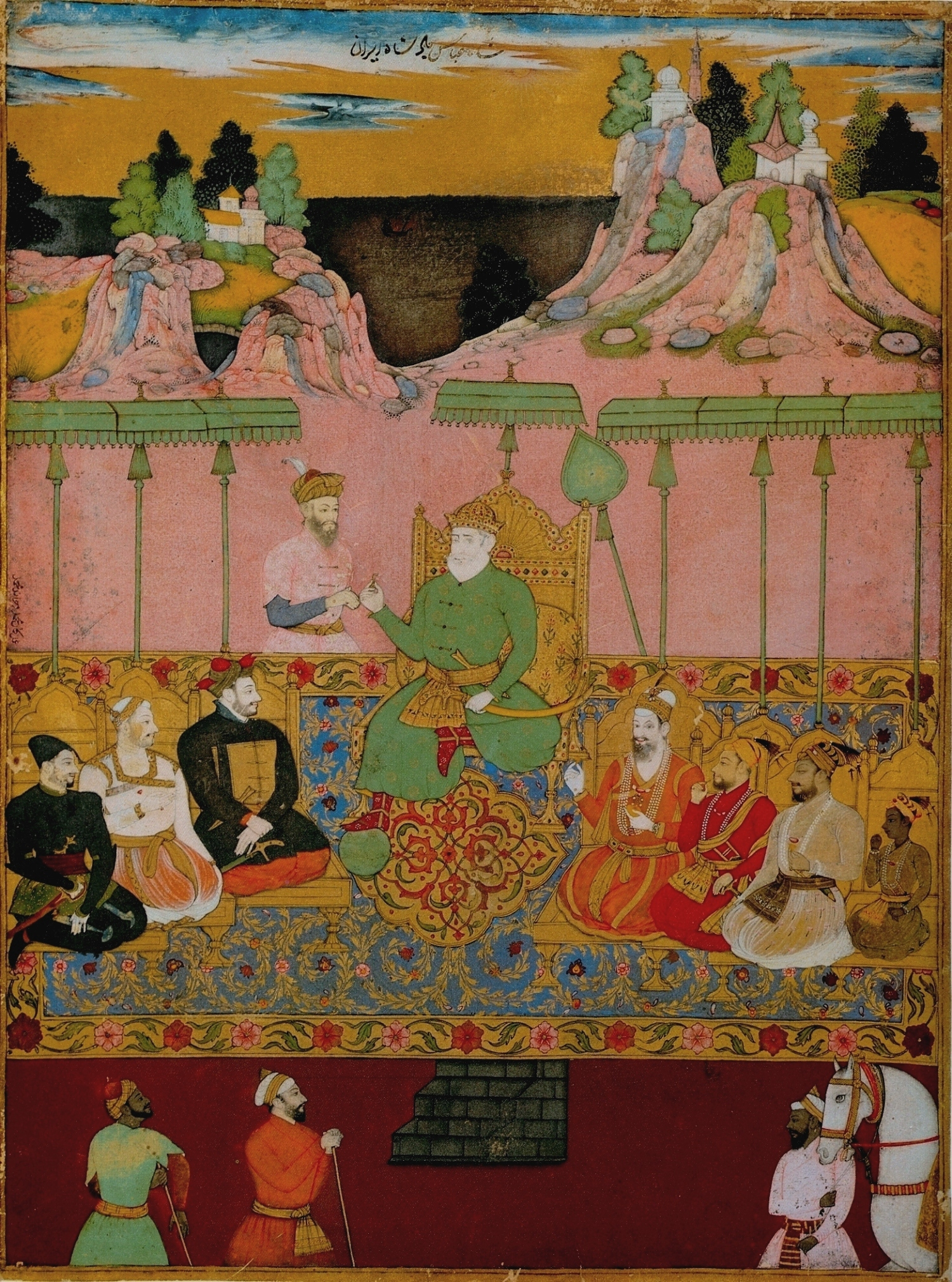

Regions with significant populations
- india: 12,971,152
- Pakistan: Unknown
- UAE: Unknown

Religions
- Sunni, Shia, Shia Ismaili

Languages
- Marathi • Konkani • Hindustani

The term Muslim Marathas is usually used to signify Marathi Muslims from the state of Maharashtra in north-western coast of India, who speak Marathi as a mother-tongue (first language) and Urdu and follow certain customs slightly differing from the rest of Indian Muslims. According to 2001 Indian census, there were 10,270,485 Muslims in Maharashtra and constituted 10.60% of the state population.

== See also ==
- Islam in India
