= Liaquat Soldier =

Pakistani actor

- Born: Liaquat Ali; 1952; Karachi, Sindh, Pakistan
- Died: 30 March 2011 (aged 58); Karachi, Sindh, Pakistan
- Occupations: Actor, comedian
- Years active: 1973–2011

Liaquat Ali (Urdu: لیاقت سولجر; 1952 – 30 March 2011), better known as Liaquat Soldier, was a Pakistani stage and television comedy actor, writer, and director.

== Early life ==
He was born in 1952 in a modest, low-income family of Marwari background in Karachi, while Soldier's unusual last name was given to him by his friend Nazar Hussain, a stage artist.

== Career ==
He started his acting career in 1973 and featured in over 250 plays and co-starred with many famous theatre personalities, including the likes of Moin Akhtar, Furqan Haider, Umer Sharif, Hanif Raja and Shahzad Raza.

The TV channels which Soldier worked for included Geo TV, SAMAA TV, Dhoom TV, Metro, Hum TV and ARY Digital. Overseas, he worked in the United States, Dubai and South Africa.

== Death ==
On 30 March 2011, Soldier died of a heart attack; before his immediate death, he was reportedly participating in a live TV show during a special transmission of the semi-final between India and Pakistan of the 2011 Cricket World Cup and had died by the time he was taken to the hospital. His death was called "a big loss to the world of comedy dramas", while, a friend described him as not only a good actor but a “humble, good person." The news of his death was also announced on Cricinfo, in the commentary scorecard at the start of Pakistan's innings in the match.

Soldier is survived by his wife, daughter and three sons. His body is buried in the old Mewa Shah Graveyard located in SITE Town.
