= Samanabad (Karachi) =

Samanabad (Urdu: سمن آباد), or Block 18 of Federal B Area, is one of the neighborhoods of Gulberg Town in Karachi, Sindh, Pakistan.

Several ethnic groups reside in Samanabad, including Muhajirs as majority, Sindhis, Punjabis, Kashmiris, Seraikis, Pakhtuns, Balochis, etc. Over 99% of the population is Muslim. The population of Gulberg Town is estimated to be nearly one million

== See also ==
- Gulberg
- Aisha Manzil
- Ancholi
- Azizabad
- Karimabad
- Shafiq Mill Colony
- Water Pump
- Yaseenabad
- Musa Colony
- Dastagir Colony
