= Naseerabad, Karachi =

Naseerabad نصیر آباد
- Neighbourhood
- Country: Pakistan
- City: Karachi
- District: Karachi Central

Government
  - PTI: MNA MUHAMMAD ASLAM
- Time zone: UTC+5 (PST)
- Postal code: 75300

Naseerabad (Urdu: نصیر آباد) is a neighbourhood in the Karachi Central district of Karachi, Pakistan. The term is often used to refer to Block 14 of Federal B. Area, Karachi.

== Places ==
There are many famous places like haji mehfooz sheermal house, Asif rabri house, Ambala kabab house, Iqbal Pan shop, Salimabad Jamat khana, Kundan broast, Allama iqbal University And there are also many apartments like "Al-Siraj Square", Fareed square, mehboob square, Ruqaiya square and many more.

== See also ==
- Gulberg
- Aisha Manzil
- Ancholi
- Azizabad
- Karimabad
- Shafiq Mill Colony
- Water Pump
- Yaseenabad
- Musa Colony
- Dastagir Colony
- Dastagir Colony
