= Federal B. Area =

Residential area in Karachi

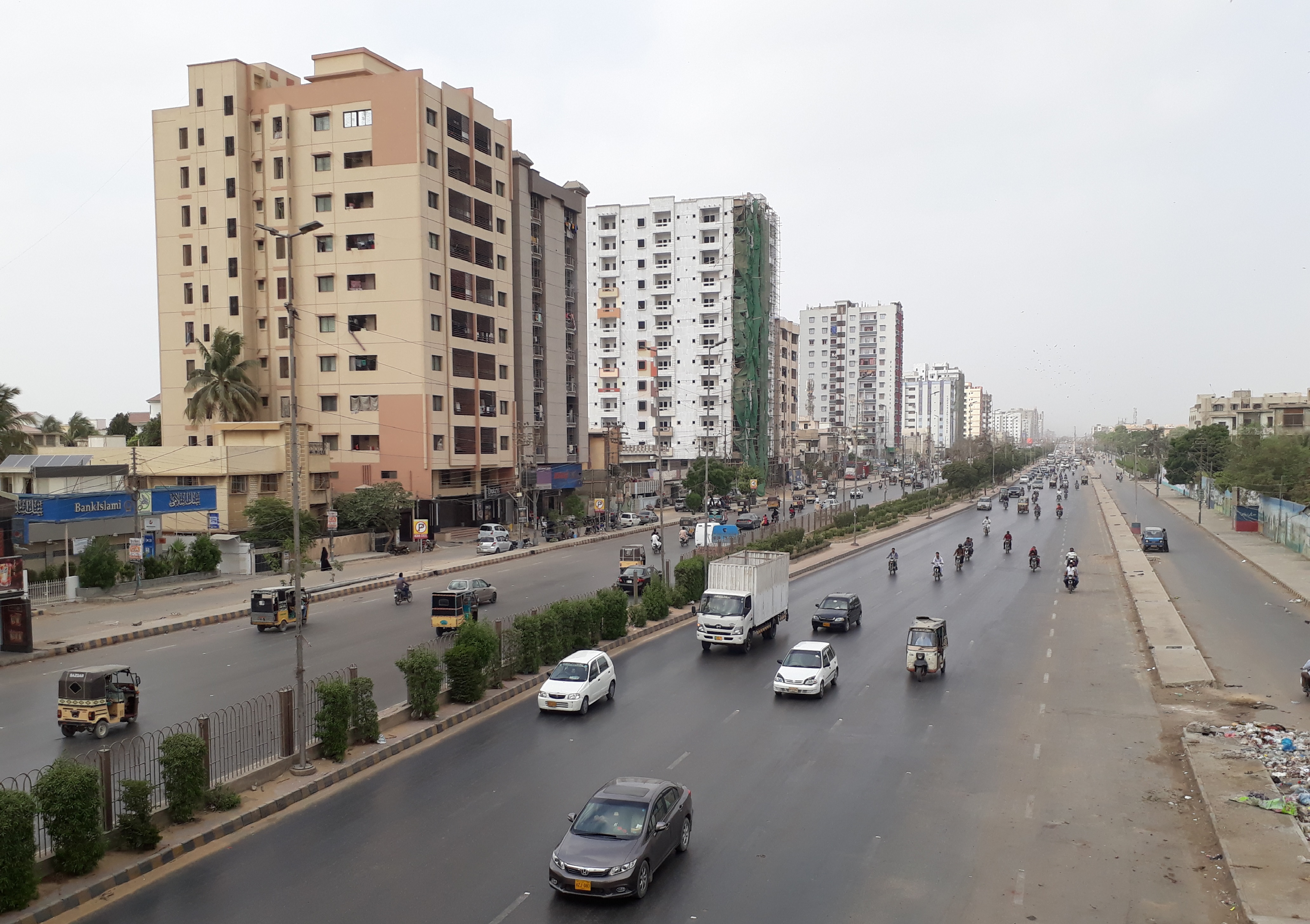
Federal B Area in Karachi

Federal B. Area (Urdu: فیڈرل بی ایریا), or F. B. Area, is a residential area in Karachi, Sindh, Pakistan.

== History ==
After the independence of Pakistan in 1947, thousands of federal government employees migrated to Pakistan and faced a housing crisis. In 1953 Muhammad Ali Bogra, then Prime Minister, initiated a housing scheme for government employees in area now known as Federal B. Area in Karachi, which was Pakistan's capital at the time.

When Pakistan came into being the port city of Karachi was chosen as the capital of the federation. An area within Karachi was selected to serve as the home of federal government offices and employees and house other important buildings. This area was named Federal Capital Area or F. C. Area. The residential area around F. C. Area came to be known as Federal B Area or F. B. Area.

The area surrounding the F. C. and F. B. Areas were designated as buffer zones; all residential construction was barred in the buffer zone to keep the city's main population of Karachi away from the F. C. Area. However, when the capital was moved from Karachi to Islamabad, the F. C. Area's name was changed to Federal B Area.

There are 22 distinct blocks in Federal B Area. The blocks are also known by other names, including blocks 1 and 2 as Sharifabad, block 3 as Hussainabad, blocks 4, 5, and 6 as Tayyababad, blocks 7 and 8 as Azizabad, blocks 9 and 10 as Dastagir, blocks 11 and 12 as Sharifabad, blocks 14 and 15 as Naseerabad, block 16 as Water Pump, blocks 17 and 18 as Samanabad, block 19 as Al-Noor Society, block 20 as Ancholi, and blocks 21 and 22 as the Industrial Area.

== Shahrah-e-Pakistan ==
Another aspect of the area's geography is that Shahrah-e-Pakistan runs through it. This main artery of the city roughly bisects the area into two zones. The importance of the road cannot be overlooked. It is the same road which runs from the Port of Karachi to all the way to Landi Kotal in Khyber Pakhtunkhwa.

== Neighbourhoods ==
- Samanabad
- Ayesha Manzil
- Ancholi
- Al-Noor
- Roshan Bagh
- Azizabad
- Karimabad
- Hussainabad
- Shafiq Mill Colony
- Naseerabad
- Water Pump
- Yaseenabad
- Dastagir
- Nomanabad Mansoora Block-16

== See also ==
- Federal Capital Territory
- Gulberg Town
- Dastagir Colony
- Talimi Bagh
