= Yaseenabad =

Yaseenabad ياسين آباد
- Neighbourhood
- Country: Pakistan
- City: Karachi
- District: Karachi Central
- Time zone: UTC+5 (PST)
- Postal code: 75300

Yaseenabad or Yasinabad (Urdu: ياسين آباد) is a neighbourhood in the Karachi Central district of Karachi, Pakistan.

== See also ==
- Aisha Manzil
- Ancholi
- Azizabad
- Karimabad
- Shafiq Mill Colony
- Naseerabad
- Water Pump
- Gulberg Town
- Musa Colony
- Dastagir Colony
