= NA-248 Karachi Central-II =

Constituency of the National Assembly of Pakistan

- Constituency for the National Assembly of Pakistan
- Region: Gulberg Town, New Karachi Town (partly) and Liaquatabad Town (partly) of Karachi Central District in Karachi
- Electorate: 590,713

Current constituency
- Party: MQM-P
- Member: Khalid Maqbool Siddiqui
- Created from: NA-246 Karachi-VIII

NA-248 Karachi Central-II ( این اے-248، کراچی وسطی-2) is a constituency for the National Assembly of Pakistan. It primarily covers the Liaquatabad and parts of the Nazimabad areas of Karachi Central District in Sindh.

== Area ==
The constituency includes the areas of Bandhani Colony, Godhra Camp, Al Azam Square, Gabol Colony, Sharifabad, Timber Market, Hussainabad, Sohrab Goth, Azizabad, Al Noor Society, Aga Khan University Hospital, Samanabad, Gulberg, Ancholi, Water Pump, Gulshan-e-Ameen, and Yousuf Plaza.

== Assembly Segments ==
Constituency number	Constituency	District	Current MPA	Party
124	PS-124 Karachi Central-III	Karachi Central	Abdul Basit	MQM-P
125	PS-125 Karachi Central-IV	Karachi Central	Syed Adil Askari	MQM-P
126	PS-126 Karachi Central-V	Karachi Central	Iftikhar Alam	MQM-P

== Members of Parliament ==
=== 2002–2018: NA-246 Karachi-VIII ===
Election	Member	Party
2002	Haji Aziz Ullah	MQM
2008	Sufiyan Yousuf	MQM
2013	Nabil Gabol	MQM
2015	Kunwar Naveed Jamil	MQM

=== 2018–2023: NA-254 Karachi Central-II ===
Election	Member	Party
2018	Muhammad Aslam Khan	PTI

=== 2024–present: NA-248 Karachi Central-II ===
Election	Member	Party
2024	Khalid Maqbool Siddiqui	MQM–P

== Election 2002 ==
General elections were held on 10 October 2002. Haji Aziz Ullah of Muttahida Qaumi Movement won by 53,134 votes.

General election 2002: NA-246 Karachi Central-VIII
Party	Candidate	Votes	%	±%
MQM	Aziz Ullah	53,134	54.71	
MMA	Rashid Naseem	32,879	33.85	
PST	Altaf Hussain Qadri Babi	3,840	3.95	
PPP	Khalid Ali Shanshah	3,075	3.17	
PML(Q)	Naisra Athar	2,322	2.39	
Others	Others (five candidates)	1,878	1.93	
Turnout		97,965	37.43	
Total valid votes		97,128	99.15	
Rejected ballots		837	0.85	
Majority		20,255	20.86	
Registered electors		261,736		
MQM hold				

== Election 2008 ==
General elections were held on 18 February 2008. Sufiyan Yousuf of the Muttahida Qaumi Movement won by 186,993 votes.

General election 2008: NA-246 Karachi Central-VIII
Party	Candidate	Votes	%	±%
MQM	Sufiyan Yousuf	186,933	96.22	
PPP	Sohail Ansari	6,741	3.47	
Independent	Saifullah	604	0.31	
Turnout		195,559	63.07	
Total valid votes		194,278	99.35	
Rejected ballots		1,281	0.65	
Majority		180,192	92.75	
Registered electors		310,045		
MQM hold				

== Election 2013 ==
General elections were held on 11 May 2013. Nabeel Gabol of Muttahida Qaumi Movement won by 137,874 votes and became the member of National Assembly.

General election 2013: NA-246 Karachi Central-VIII
Party	Candidate	Votes	%	±%
MQM	Nabil Gabol	137,874	73.99	
PTI	Amir Sharjeel	31,875	17.10	
JI	Rashid Naseem	10,321	5.54	
Others	Others (six candidates)	6,285	3.37	
Turnout		202,301	56.54	
Total valid votes		186,355	92.12	
Rejected ballots		15,946	7.88	
Majority		105,999	56.89	
Registered electors		357,781		
MQM hold				

== By-election 2015 ==
A by-election was held on 23 April 2015 due to the resignation of Nabeel Gabol, the previous MNA from this seat. Kanwar Naveed Jamil of Muttahida Qaumi Movement won by 95,644 votes while Imran Ismail of the Pakistan Tehreek-e-Insaf was in second place with 35,546 votes.

By-election 2015: NA-246 Karachi Central-VIII
Party	Candidate	Votes	%	±%
MQM	Kunwar Naveed Jamil	95,644	73.41	
PTI	Imran Ismail	24,821	19.05	
JI	Rashid Naseem	9,056	6.95	
Others	Others (twelve candidates)	774	0.59	
Turnout		131,424	36.73	
Total valid votes		130,295	99.14	
Rejected ballots		1,129	0.86	
Majority		70,823	54.36	
Registered electors		357,801		
MQM hold				

== Election 2018 ==
General elections were held on 25 July 2018.

General election 2018: NA-254 Karachi Central-II
Party	Candidate	Votes	%	±%
PTI	Muhammad Aslam Khan	75,702	38.61	
MQM-P	Sheikh Salahuddin	48,813	24.90	
TLP	Mufti Ateeq Ahmed Ismail Zai	28,546	14.56	
MMA	Rashid Naseem	26,373	13.45	
Others	Others (twelve candidates)	16,629	8.48	
Turnout		198,897	39.20	
Total valid votes		196,063	98.58	
Rejected ballots		2,834	1.42	
Majority		26,889	13.71	
Registered electors		507,438		
PTI gain from MQM-P				

== Election 2024 ==
General elections were held on 8 February 2024. Khalid Maqbool Siddiqui won the election with 103,082 votes.

General election 2024: NA-248 Karachi Central-II
Party	Candidate	Votes	%	±%
MQM-P	Khalid Maqbool Siddiqui	103,082	38.87	▲13.97
PTI	Arslan Khalid (Note: Filed nomination papers as PTI candidate but ECP allowed him to run as an Independent)	86,342	32.56	▼6.05
JI	Muhammad Babar Khan	38,881	14.66	N/A
TLP	Muhammad Amjad Ali	13,134	4.95	▼9.61
PPP	Muhammad Hassan Khan	5,448	2.05	▲0.31
Others	Others (twenty nine candidates)	18,306	6.90	
Turnout		266,077	44.36	▲5.16
Total valid votes		265,193	99.67	
Rejected ballots		884	0.33	
Majority		17,460	6.58	
Registered electors		599,811		
MQM-P gain from PTI				

== See also ==
- NA-247 Karachi Central-I
- NA-249 Karachi Central-III
