= Bengalis in Pakistan =

Ethnic Bengali citizens and nationals of Pakistan

পাকিস্তানি বাঙালি (Bengali) پاکستانی بنگالی (Urdu)
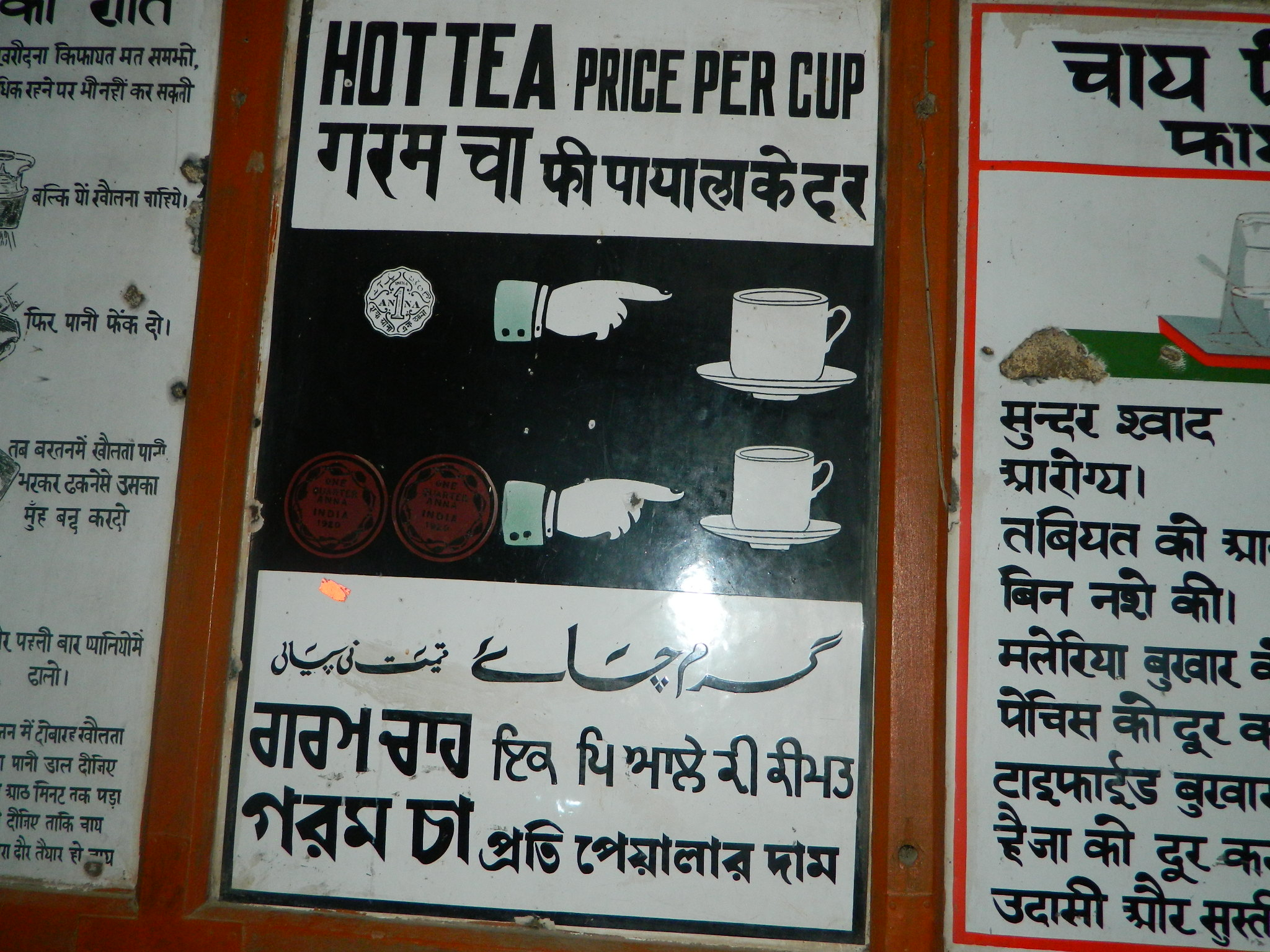
- The use of the Bengali language at Golra Sharif Railway Museum, Islamabad

Total population
- 3,000,000 (2023)

Regions with significant populations
- Karachi and other parts of Sindh

Languages
- Bengali (native) · Urdu (predominant) · Sindhi · English (Pakistani English)

Religion
- Predominantly; Sunni Islam; Small minority; Hinduism

Related ethnic groups
- Other Bengalis (specifically Bangladeshis)

Bengalis in Pakistan, in the present day, refers to two communities: Bengali Pakistanis who are Pakistani citizens of ethnic Bengali background, and Bengali immigrants in Pakistan who immigrated to Pakistan from Bangladesh. The Bengali Pakistanis are predominantly the descendants of East Pakistani migrants in West Pakistan who stayed in Pakistan following Bangladeshi independence. They are predominantly bilingual speaking both Urdu and Bengali and are mainly settled in Karachi.

Prior to its independence, Bangladesh was part of Pakistan as East Pakistan and the term 'Pakistani Bengali' was applied to Bengalis in the country. Following independence, the term became disassociated with East Pakistan and became restyled to be used for the ethnic Bengali population in West Pakistan (present-day Pakistan). The absence of strong bilateral communication between Pakistan and Bangladesh prior to the July Uprising in 2024, prevented Pakistani Bengalis from visiting relatives in Bangladesh or sending financial support.

The lack of citizenship documentation for the Bengali immigrants in Pakistan makes them vulnerable to exploitation by employers. Additionally, the absence of a birth registration certificate (referred to as a B-form) has obstructed the education of many and, without a Computerised National ID Card (CNIC), barred them from pursuing high-paying job opportunities.

== History ==
=== Pre-1947 ===
The founding members of the Pakistani Bengali community were early migrants from East Bengal who arrived in Sindh during the early 20th century. This community of early Bengali settlers assimilated into Pakistani culture and adopted Urdu or became bilingual Bengali speakers.

=== 1947-1971 ===
After Pakistan's independence in 1947, a large influx of Bengalis arrived in Karachi from East Pakistan to West Pakistan. In 1971, some Bengalis opted to return to the newly independent Bangladesh while others opted to remain in Pakistan.

=== Post-1971, illegal migration and crime ===
Thousands of East Pakistan Bengalis were living in West Pakistan before the 1971 war and Bangladeshi immigrants arrived in Pakistan right after their war against the same country. These Bengalis were Pakistan supporters, however, due to the political climate of the war they were not socially accepted or granted citizenship of Pakistan. By 1995, continuous migration of Bangladeshis, mostly illegal, crossed the 1,500,000 mark. During the administration of Prime Minister Benazir Bhutto, members of the political party became concerned with the large Bangladeshi migrant population, afraid they could become the second largest group in Karachi after the Muhajir people and disturb sensitive demographics. Crime was also becoming a rising concern. Accordingly, Bhutto ordered a crackdown and deportation of Bangladeshi immigrants. Benazir Bhutto's action strained and created tensions in Bangladesh–Pakistan relations, with Khaleda Zia, who was in power in Dhaka during the time, refusing to accept the deportees and reportedly sending two planeloads back towards Pakistan and Muslim political parties in Pakistan criticising Bhutto and dubbing the crackdown as anti-Islamic. She was ultimately forced to abandon the order.

In 2021, it was reported that over two million Bengalis illegally resided in Pakistan. The Bangladeshi government has refused to accept refugees because it is government policy to not accept citizens who left the country illegally.

In 2024, the Pakistan Rangers caught at least one Bangladeshi crossing into the country illegally from the eastern border.

== Demographics ==
According to Shaikh Muhammad Feroze, chairman of the Pakistani Bengali Action Committee, over 200 settlements of Bengali-speaking people exist in Pakistan (mainly in Sindh) of which 132 are in Karachi while other smaller communities exist in Thatta, Badin, Hyderabad, Tando Adam and Lahore. There are numerous Bengali colonies in Karachi, often called "Little Bangladesh" (or East Pakistan Colony in memorandum), such as Machar Colony, Musa Colony and Chittagong Colony. Colorful Bengali signboards, Bhashani caps, lungis and kurtas are often seen in these areas of Karachi and remain unique. The Chittagong Colony has a bazaar, which is famous throughout Pakistan as the center for Dhaka cloth. In more recent times, the Bengali population has seen a decline as the journey from Bangladesh is dangerous and crosses the tense India-Pakistan border. Furthermore, given the tense ethnic rivalries and lack of social acceptance in Pakistan, Bengalis have now been migrating elsewhere. Instances of Bengali Pakistanis being denied access to essential public services, such as hospitals and clinics, are frequently reported. Several cases have emerged where Bengalis, despite possessing official Pakistani National Identity Cards (NIC), were rejected by hospitals and denied medical assistance solely due to their Bengali heritage.

== Notable people ==
- Khwaja Hassan Askari, the last Nawab of Dhaka
- Muhammad Mahmood Alam, flying ace of Pakistan Air Force most famous for his service and numerous kills in Indo-Pak Wars
- Sarfaraz Ahmed Rafiqui, Pakistani fighter pilot
- Khwaja Khairuddin, a Pakistani politician
- Khwaja Shahabuddin, a Pakistani politician and diplomat
- Khwaja Zakiuddin, Pakistani aristocrat and statesman
- Khwaja Habibullah, the penultimate Nawab of Dhaka
- Muhammad Ali Bogra, Pakistani politician who served as Pakistan's third prime minister (1953–55) and also as foreign minister (1954–55 and 1962–63)
- Alamgir, a popular Pakistani pop singer in the 1970s and 80s, known as founder of pop in Pakistan
- Hassan Jahangir, famous Pakistani popstar and singer of Hawa Hawa. Born in Karachi to Bengali parents
- Robin Ghosh, Pakistani music composer and playback singer
- Shabnam, one of Pakistan's most popular actresses
- Rahman, one of Pakistan's most popular actors, famously paired with Shabnam
- Runa Laila, singer who later moved back to Bangladesh
- Shahnaz Rahmatullah, singer who sang Pakistan's two most popular patriotic songs Jeevay Jeevay Pakistan and Sohni Dharti. Later moved back to Bangladesh
- Munni Begum, a Pakistani ghazal singer
- Nurul Amin, a jurist who served as prime minister of Pakistan
- A. K. Fazlul Huq, Pakistani lawyer and politician who was Chief Minister of East Bengal 1954, Interior Minister 1955–56, Governor of East Pakistan 1956–58
- Habibullah Bahar Chowdhury, a politician, journalist and sportsman
- Hamidul Huq Choudhury, Pakistani politician, lawyer, and newspaper proprietor who served as Foreign Minister 1955–56
- Golam Wahed Choudhury, Pakistani political scientist and diplomat
- Maulvi Tamizuddin Khan, Pakistani politician who served as second and fourth Speaker of the Pakistani National Assembly
- Abdul Wahab Khan, Pakistani politician who served as third Speaker of the National Assembly
- Fazlul Qadir Chaudhry, Pakistani politician who served as 5th Speaker of the National Assembly
- Abdul Jabbar Khan, Pakistani politician who served as 6th Speaker of the National Assembly and as Acting President of Pakistan in 1965 and 1969
- Abdullah al Mahmood, Pakistani politician and lawyer
- Roopa Farooki – British writer (half Pakistani, half Bangladeshi)
- Tariq Fatemi, a Pakistani diplomat who serves as the Special Assistant to the prime minister of Pakistan on Foreign Affairs, and previously served as Pakistan Ambassador to the United States and to the European Union
- Zaib-un-Nissa Hamidullah, feminist writer
- Altaf Husain, a Pakistan Movement activist and founding editor and the first editor-in-chief of Dawn
- Shaista Suhrawardy Ikramullah, a prominent Pakistani female politician, diplomat and author
- Naz Ikramullah, British-Canadian artist and film producer of Pakistani-Bengali origin
- Sarvath Ikramullah, Jordanian royal and wife of Prince Hassan bin Talal who is of Pakistani-Bengali origin
- Shahida Jamil, is a Pakistani lawyer and politician
- Begum Akhtar Riazuddin, feminist activist
- Perween Rahman, Pakistani social activist
- Iskander Mirza, a politician who served as the first President of Pakistan
- Indu Mitha, is a Pakistani exponent of Bharatnatyam and faculty member at the National College of Arts
- Deebo Bhattacharya, musician, painter, and singer
- Satya Prakash Singha, Pakistani politician
- Jogendra Nath Mandal, Pakistani politician, later returned to India
- Bhupendra Kumar Dutta, revolutionary and politician
- Ashraf Tai, pioneer of Bando karate in Pakistan
- Fazlul Karim, politician, lawyer, businessman, and soldier who served as Cox's Bazars Mayor in the 1950s
- Mohammad Akram Khan, Islamic scholar, politician, and journalist
- Sir Khawaja Nazimuddin, a conservative Pakistani politician and statesman who served as the 2nd prime minister of Pakistan
- Sir Abdur Rahim, jurist and Islamic author who participated in the Pakistan Movement
- Jalaludin Abdur Rahim, Nietzschean philosopher and one of the founders of the influential Pakistan People's Party
- Hamoodur Rahman, a jurist who served as the Chief Justice of Pakistan
- Hameedur Rahman, a senior judge of the Supreme Court of Pakistan
- Syed Sajjad Hussain, academic, writer, and Pakistan Movement activist
- Muhammad Qudrat-i-Khuda, Pakistani-Bangladeshi chemist
- Abdus Salam Chatgami, Islamic scholar and former Grand Mufti of Jamia Uloom-ul-Islamia
- Abdul Monem Khan, governor of East Pakistan 1962–69
- Abdul Motaleb Malik, politician who was the last civilian governor of East Pakistan
- Mawlana Abdur Rahim, Islamic scholar, politician, Ameer of Jamaat-e-Islami East Pakistan, and Naib Ameer of Jamaat-e-Islami Pakistan
- Ghulam Azam, politician and Ameer of Jamaat-e-Islami East Pakistan and Jamaat-e-Islami Bangladesh, later returned to Bangladesh.
- Motiur Rahman Nizami, Islamic scholar and politician who led the Islami Chhatro Shongho (student wing of JIEP) and was Ameer of Jamaat-e-Islami Bangladesh, later returned to Bangladesh
- Chowdhury Mueen-Uddin, former Pakistani journalist and British Muslim leader
- Ashrafuz Zaman Khan, former employee of Radio Pakistan and American Muslim leader
- Yusuf Ali Chowdhury, Pakistani politician
- Najma Sadeque, journalist, author, and women's rights activist
- Ikram Sehgal, defence analyst
- Abul Hassan Isphani, Pakistani politician and diplomat
- Farahnaz Ispahani, Pakistani-American writer and politician
- Huseyn Shaheed Suhrawardy, a politician who served as prime minister of Pakistan
- Hasan Shaheed Suhrawardy, polyglot scholar and diplomat, brother of the former
- Begum Akhtar Sulaiman, Pakistani social worker, political activist and the daughter of Huseyn Shaheed Suhrawardy
- Mahmud Ali, Pakistani politician
- Abdul Matin Chaudhary, Pakistani politician and journalist
- Ajmal Ali Choudhury, Pakistani politician
- Mahbub Jamal Zahedi, Pakistani journalist and philatelist
- Nighat Seema, Pakistani singer
- Ahsan Ali Taj, Pakistani musician, songwriter, and singer
- Muslehuddin, Pakistani composer

== See also ==
- Bangladesh–Pakistan relations
- Stranded Pakistanis in Bangladesh
- List of Pakistani Bengali films
- Musa Colony
- Daily Qaumi Bandhan
- Machar Colony
- Chittagong Colony
- Rohingya refugees in Pakistan
