= Gulberg Town, Karachi =

Coordinates: 24.9369°N 67.0759°E

Gulberg Town گلبرگ ٹاؤن
- Constituent Town of Karachi
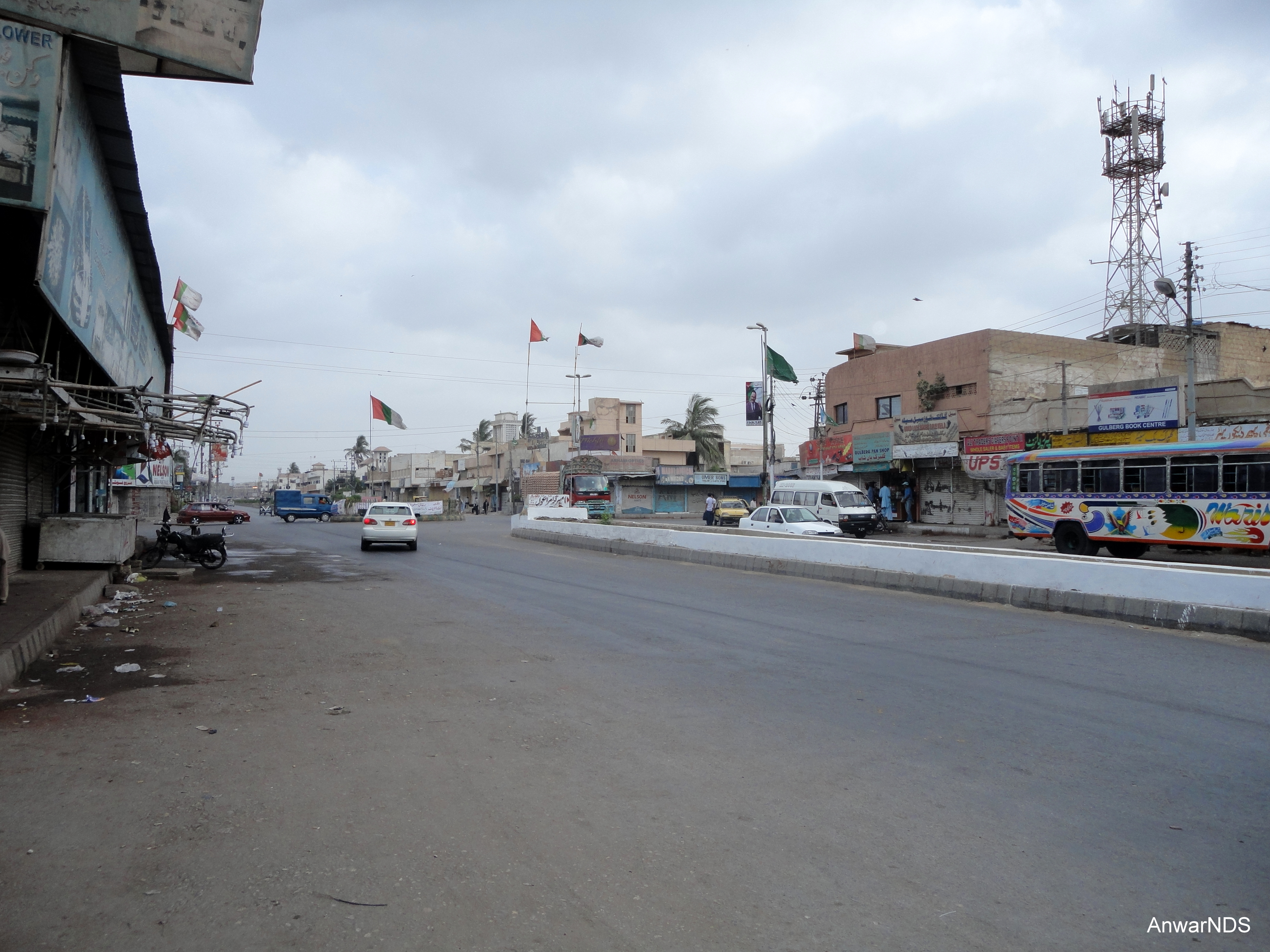

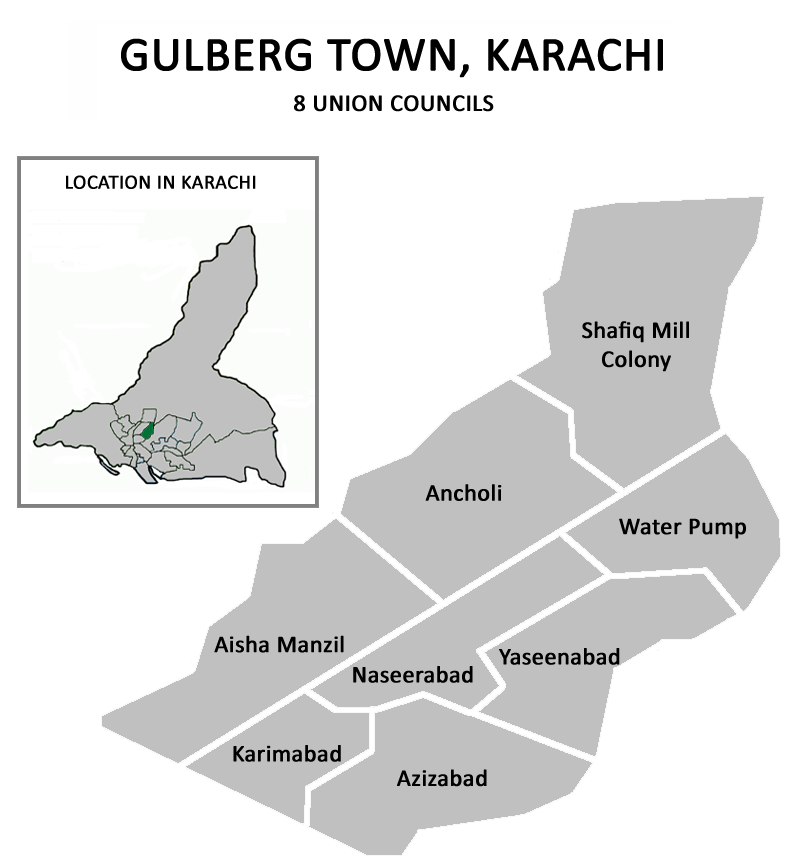
- Gulberg Town was divided into 8 Union Councils
- Country: Pakistan
- Province: Sindh
- City District: Karachi
- Established: 14 August 2001
- Union Councils: 8: Shafiq Colony Samanabad Water Pump Naseerabad Yaseenabad Azizabad Karimabad Gulberg

Government
  - Type: Government of Karachi
  - Town Chaiman: Nusrat Ullah

Area
  - Total: 14 km^{2} (5.4 sq mi)
- Elevation: 36 m (118 ft)

Population (2023 Pakistani census)
  - Total: 613,724
  - Density: 43,837.43/km^{2} (113,538.4/sq mi)
- Time zone: UTC+05:00 (PKT)
  - Summer (DST): DST is not observed
- ZIP Code: 75950
- NWD (area) code: 021
- ISO 3166 code: PK-SD

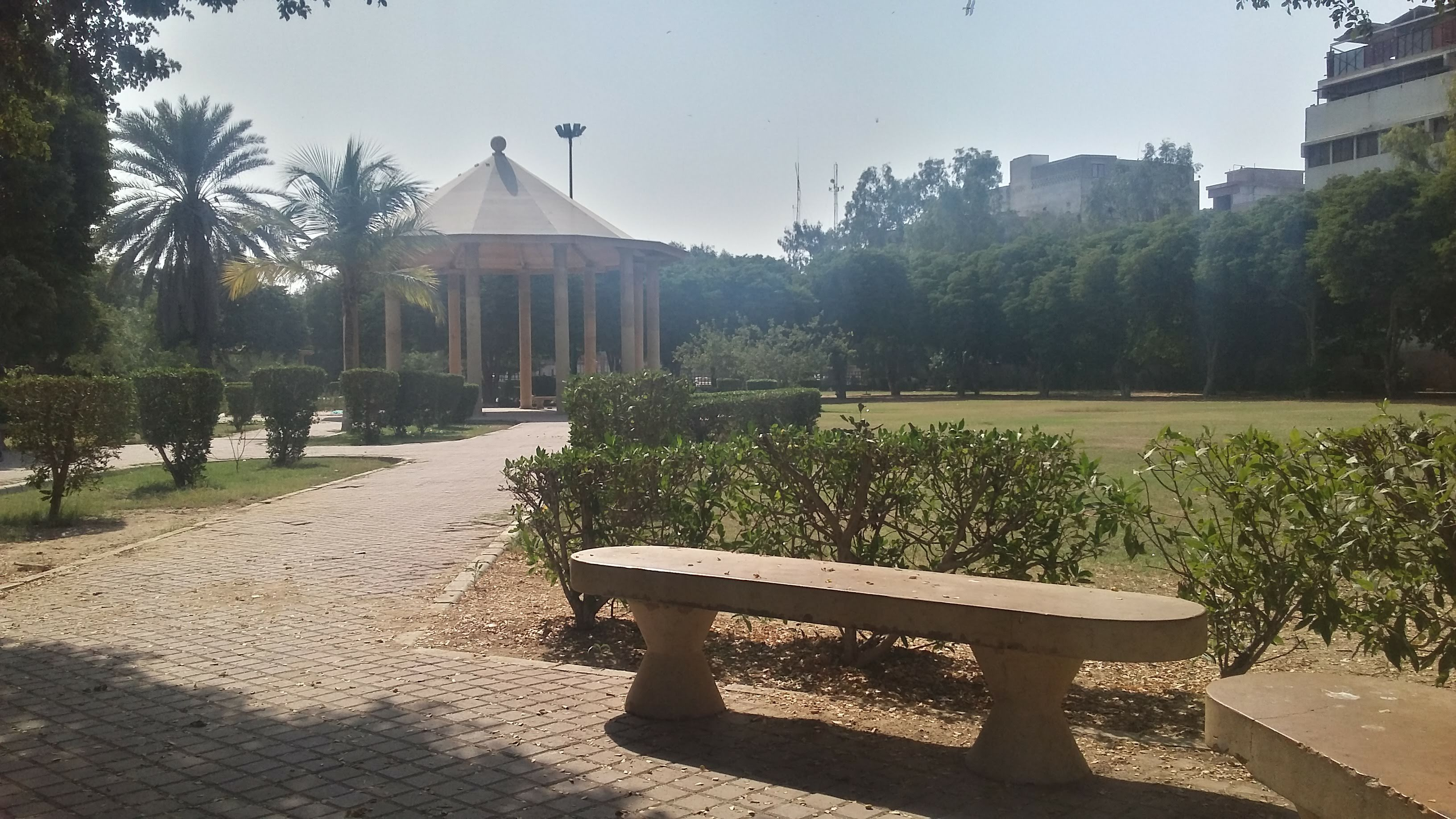
Sir Syed Park, Gulberg Town

Gulberg Town (Sindhi and Urdu: گلبرگ) lies in the northern part of Karachi, Pakistan. Gulberg Town was formed in 2001 as part of the Local Government Ordinance 2001, and was subdivided into 11 union councils. The town system was disbanded in 2011, and Gulberg Town was re-organized as part of Karachi Central District in 2015 and the Karachi Towns were restored in early 2022.

== Town Municipal Committee ==
As per the Sindh Local Government Act, 2021, Sindh government replaced the previous seven District Municipal Corporations (DMCs) with 26 towns, each with its own municipal committee. Karachi Central District has five towns.

- New Karachi Town
- North Nazimabad Town
- Gulberg Town
- Liaquatabad Town
- Nazimabad Town

== Demographics ==
Languages of Gulberg Subdivision Karachi (2023 Pakistani census)
1. Urdu (81.8%)
2. Pashto (4.33%)
3. Punjabi (3.46%)
4. Saraiki (2.53%)
5. Sindhi (2.20%)
6. Balochi (0.60%)
7. Hindko (0.50%)
8. Others (4.50%)

There are 613,724 people in Gulberg Subdivision of which 502,002 spoke Urdu, 26,576 Pashto, 21,243 Punjabi, 15,542 Saraiki, 13,310 Sindhi, 3,765 Balochi, 3,054 Hindko and 28,232 others.

== Location ==
Gulberg Town was bordered by the Lyari River and Gulshan Town to the east and the Gujjar Nala stream and North Nazimabad Town to the west. Also neighbouring Gulberg were New Karachi and Gadap to the north and Liaquatabad to the south.

== History ==
The federal government introduced local government reforms in the year 2000, which eliminated the previous "third tier of government" (administrative divisions) and replaced it with the fourth tier (districts). The effect in Karachi was the dissolution of the former Karachi Division in 2001, and the merging of its five districts to form a new Karachi City-District with eighteen autonomous constituent towns including Gulberg Town. In 2011, the system was disbanded but remained in place for bureaucratic administration until 2015, when the Karachi Metropolitan Corporation system was reintroduced. In 2015, Gulberg Town was re-organized as part of Karachi Central district.

== Education and academia ==
Apart from the socio-economic diversification, this town had the distinction of being one of the most literate middle/upper middle class parts of the city along with North Nazimabad Town. There were numerous coaching centres in Gulberg Town.

"Markaz-e-Umeed" (The Hope Center) is one of the oldest schools for intellectually disabled children in Pakistan, established in 1971.

== Hospitals ==
- Tabba Heart Institute
- Habib Medical Center
- Aga Khan Hospital for Women Karimabad (Ayesha Manzil)
- Usman Memorial Hospital
- Mamji Hospital
- Aziza Husseni Hospital
- Karachi Institute of Heart Diseases
- Federal Hospital
- Alnoor Hospital
- Muhammadi Hospital
- Rafah-e-aam Medical
- Nazeer hussain Hospital
- Mother care Hospital

== Neighbourhoods ==
- Samanabad
- Aisha Manzil
- Ancholi
- Alnoor Society
- Azizabad
- Karimabad
- Shafiq Mill Colony
- Naseerabad
- Water Pump
- Yaseenabad
- Musa Colony
- Dastagir Colony
- Hussainabad
