= Chittagong (disambiguation) =

Chittagong is a city in south-eastern Bangladesh.

Chittagong may also refer to:

- Chittagong Division, an administrative division of Bangladesh
- Chittagong District, a district in the south-eastern region of Bangladesh
- Chittagong Hill Tracts, an area in south-eastern Bangladesh
- Chittagong Court Building, district court of Chittagong
- Chittagong (film), a 2012 Indian film based upon actual events about British India's (now in Bangladesh) Chittagong Uprising
- Port of Chittagong, the largest seaport in Bangladesh
- Chittagong Colony, a Bengali neighborhood in Karachi, Pakistan
- Chittagong Court Building, historical court house in Chittagong city.

== See also ==
- Chittagonian (disambiguation)
