= Dastagir =

Coordinates: 24°53′N 67°02′E

Dastagir (Urdu: دستگیر) is a neighbourhood in Gulberg Town, in Karachi, Sindh, Pakistan. It is mainly used to refer to Block 14 and 15 of Federal B. Area, Karachi.

There are several ethnic groups in Dastagir including Muhajirs, Punjabis, Sindhis, Kashmiris, Seraikis, Pakhtuns, Balochis, Memons, Bohras and Ismailis. There are many schools like "H.B MALI PUBLIC SCHOOL", Study Collegiate and Speak and Spell.

== See also ==
- Dastagir Colony
