= List of slums in Pakistan =

This is a list of notable slums in Pakistan.

- Orangi Town in Karachi was Asia's largest slum as of 2016, with an estimated population of 2.4 million.
- Machar Colony is considered one of the poorest, most densely populated, and most dilapidated informal settlements in Karachi.
- Parts of Lyari Town
- Parts of New Karachi

== See also ==
- List of slums
