= Chittagong Colony =

Neighbourhood in Karachi, Pakistan

Coordinates: 24.8982°N 67.0174°E

Chittagong Colony (Urdu: چٹگاؤں کالونی, Bengali: চিটাগাং কলোনি) is a neighbourhood in Karachi, Sindh, Pakistan. The name comes probably because people of Chittagong origin might have settled there first. Mostly Bangladeshi things dominate this, which is part of S.I.T.E. Town in the west of the city.

Bengali colonies, often referred to as 'mini Bangladesh,' are concentrated in specific areas where they coexist with Myanmar (Burma) communities, facilitated by cultural and linguistic similarities. Notably, the Chittagong Colony is one of the most prominent Bengali settlements in Karachi, reflecting the strong cultural ties between the two groups. The vast majority of Pakistani Bengalis lives in Karachi's Shanty towns, improvised human settlements, such as Machar Colony, Musa Colony or Chittagong Colony. They live lives of despair and misery, finding it hard to get jobs legally or even open bank accounts, since they don’t have national identity cards.

Chittagong Colony was also the headquarters of the Daily Qaumi Bandhan, a local Bengali language newspaper that played a significant role in promoting Bengali culture and language.

== See also ==
- Bengalis in Pakistan
