= Foreign born =

People born outside their country of residence

Foreign-born (also non-native) people are those born outside of their country of residence. Foreign born are often non-citizens, but many are naturalized citizens of the country in which they live, and others are citizens by descent, typically through a parent.

The term foreign born encompasses both immigrants and expatriates but is not synonymous with either. Foreign born may, like immigrants, have committed to living in a country permanently or, like expatriates, live abroad for a significant period with the plan to return to their birth-country eventually.

The status of foreign born — particularly their access to citizenship — differs globally. The large groups of foreign-born guest workers in the Gulf Cooperation Council states, for example, have no right to citizenship no matter the length of their residence. In Australia, Canada, the United Kingdom, and the United States, by contrast, foreign born are often citizens or in the process of becoming citizens. Certain countries have intermediary rules: in Germany and Japan it is often difficult but not impossible for the foreign born to become citizens.

== Definition ==
The adjective foreign-born has two potential meanings:

- "born in a country other than that in which one resides."
- "foreign by birth."

The United Nations uses the first definition to estimate the international migrant stock, whenever this information is available. In countries lacking data on place of birth, the UN uses the country of citizenship instead.

On the other hand, the United States Census Bureau defines foreign-born as "anyone who is not a U.S. citizen at birth", which includes persons who have become U.S. citizens through naturalization but excludes persons born abroad to a U.S. citizen parent or parents.

According to the UN: "Equating international migrants with foreign citizens when estimating the migrant stock has important shortcomings. In countries where citizenship is conferred on the basis of jus sanguinis, people who were born in the country of residence may be included in the number of international migrants even though they may have never lived abroad. Conversely, persons who were born abroad and who naturalized in their country of residence are excluded from the stock of international migrants when using citizenship as the criterion to define international migrants."

== Trends by country ==
The percentage of foreign born in a country is the product mostly of immigration rates, but is also affected by emigration rates and birth and death rates in the destination country. For example, the United Kingdom and Ireland are destination countries for migrants from Eastern Europe, Africa, and Asia, but are themselves source countries for immigration to other English-speaking countries.

The Holy See is unique in having 100% of its population foreign-born. The region with the highest rate of foreign-born residents is Oceania, with 21%, while Asia has less than 1%.

Countries with immigration rates above 25% tend to be wealthy countries with relatively open migration or labour laws, including Singapore, Australia, New Zealand, Switzerland and the Persian Gulf states.

The largest foreign-born population in the world is in the United States, which was home to 39 million foreign-born residents in 2012, or 12.6% of the population.

== Countries with the largest foreign-born populations ==
Rank	Country	Region	Percentage of foreign-born population	Largest foreign-born group
1	United Arab Emirates	Greater Middle East	88.52%	Indian
2	Qatar	Greater Middle East	81.3%	Indian
3	Kuwait	Greater Middle East	69.1%	Indian
4	Bahrain	Greater Middle East	54.6%	Indian
5	Saudi Arabia	Greater Middle East	37.37%	Indian
6	Lebanon	Greater Middle East	23%	Syrian
7	Canada	North America	23%	Indian
8	Sweden	Northern Europe	19.6%	Syrian
9	Germany	Western Europe	18%	Turkish
10	France	Western Europe	17.2%	Algerian
11	Spain	Western Europe	17.1%	Moroccan
12	United Kingdom	Northern Europe	17%	Indian
13	United States	North America	13.9%	Mexican
14	Pakistan	Greater Middle East	13.2%	Indian
15	Turkey	Greater Middle East	7.18%	Syrian
16	Colombia	South America	5.6%	Venezuelan
17	Brazil	South America	1.00%	Venezuelan
18	India	South Asia	0.4%	Bangladeshi

Direct figures on Pakistan's total foreign-born population are unavailable. However, estimates for specific immigrant communities can be found, which are as follows: 8.4% - 10% Indians (i.e., Muhajirs from India and their descendants), 1.6% - 2% Afghans, 1% Bengalis, 0.1 - 0.2% Burmese

== Countries with largest refugee populations ==
Rank	Country	Region	Refugees hosted
1	Iran	Greater Middle East	3.8 million
2	United States	North America	3.6 million
3	Turkey	Greater Middle East	3.1 million
4	Pakistan	Greater Middle East	3.1 million
5	Colombia	South America	2.8 million
6	Germany	Western Europe	2.7 million
7	Uganda	East Africa	1.7 million
8	Lebanon	Greater Middle East	1.5 million

== Metropolitan and urban regions with the largest foreign-born populations ==
1. Data for the cities listed below is from numerous sources.

Rank	Metropolitan region / urban area	Country	Foreign-born population	Sources of immigrants
1	New York metropolitan area	United States	5,892,000	China, India, Bangladesh, Dominican Republic, Jamaica, Ecuador, Guyana, Philippines, South Korea, Mexico, Peru, Trinidad and Tobago, Haiti, Italy, Colombia, Poland, Russia, Pakistan, Brazil, Cuba, Nigeria, Ghana, Greece
2	London and the home counties	United Kingdom	5,623,701	India, Poland, Bangladesh, Romania, Pakistan, Italy, Turkey, Nigeria, Ireland, Sri Lanka, Jamaica, China, France, Ghana, Philippines, Portugal, South Africa, Trinidad and Tobago, Guyana, United States, Greece, Kenya, Canada
3	Los Angeles Metropolitan Area	United States	5,541,000	Mexico, Philippines, El Salvador, China, Vietnam, South Korea, Guatemala, Ethiopia, Iran, Armenia, India, Taiwan, Nigeria, Colombia, Japan, United Kingdom, Canada
4	Greater Toronto Area (Note: Combined population of Toronto, Peel Region, York Region, Durham Region and Halton Region.)	Canada	3,231,295 (Note: Statistic includes all persons classified as 'Immigrants' and 'Non-permanent residents' on census. Statistics Canada defines 'Immigrants' as "persons who are, or who have ever been, landed immigrants or permanent residents. Such persons have been granted the right to live in Canada permanently by immigration authorities. Immigrants who have obtained Canadian citizenship by naturalization are included in this category." Statistics Canada defines 'Non-permanent residents' as "persons from another country with a usual place of residence in Canada and who have a work or study permit or who have claimed refugee status (asylum claimants). Family members living with work or study permit holders are also included, unless these family members are already Canadian citizens, landed immigrants or permanent residents.")	India, China, Philippines, Pakistan, Hong Kong, Sri Lanka, Jamaica, Italy, Iran, United Kingdom, Guyana, Portugal, Vietnam, Poland, South Korea, United States, Trinidad and Tobago, Iraq, Russia, Ukraine, Afghanistan, Egypt, Nigeria, Greece, Romania
5	Paris metropolitan area	France	3,041,148	Algeria, Portugal, Morocco, Tunisia, Spain, Romania, Turkey, China, Italy, Mali, Sri Lanka, Vietnam, Democratic Republic of Congo, Senegal, Cameroon, Martinique, Ivory Coast
6	Hong Kong (SAR)	Hong Kong	2,793,450	China, Indonesia, Philippines, Macau, Thailand, United Kingdom, France, India, Pakistan, Japan, United States, Canada
7	San Francisco Bay Area	United States	2,634,270	Mexico, China, Philippines, Vietnam, India, El Salvador, Guatemala, South Korea, Taiwan, Iran, Russia, Japan, Nicaragua
8	Sydney Greater Capital City Statistical Area	Australia	2,071,872	China, United Kingdom, India, New Zealand, Vietnam, Philippines, South Korea, Lebanon, Sri Lanka
9	Miami metropolitan area	United States	1,949,629	Cuba, Haiti, Colombia, Canada, Jamaica, Nicaragua, Venezuela, Dominican Republic, Honduras, Brazil, Panama, Peru, Argentina
10	Melbourne Greater Capital City Statistical Area	Australia	1,801,139	India, China, Vietnam, New Zealand, United Kingdom, Italy, Sri Lanka, Malaysia, Greece, Philippines, South Africa, Hong Kong, Afghanistan
11	Chicago metropolitan area	United States	1,625,649	Mexico, India, Poland, Philippines, China, Palestine, Ukraine, Italy, Guatemala, Lithuania, Ghana, Nigeria, Jamaica, Cuba, Colombia, Trinidad and Tobago
12	Brussels Urban Area	Belgium	1,441,600	France, Romania, Morocco, Italy, Spain, Poland, Portugal, Bulgaria, Germany, DR Congo, Guinea
13	Singapore (city only)	Singapore	1,305,011	Malaysia, China, India, Indonesia, Philippines, Bangladesh, Taiwan, Myanmar, South Korea
14	Berlin Urban Area	Germany	1,231,500	Turkey, Russia, Poland, Syria, Italy, Bulgaria, Romania, Serbia, France, Vietnam, United Kingdom
15	Metro Vancouver	Canada	1,222,460	Hong Kong, China, India, South Korea, Taiwan, Philippines, Vietnam, Japan, Iran, Pakistan, Poland, United Kingdom, Italy, United States
16	Greater Montreal	Canada	1,184,620	Algeria, Morocco, Romania, France, Haiti, Lebanon, Philippines, Vietnam, Italy, China, India
17	Moscow (city only)	Russia	1,128,035	Ukraine, Uzbekistan, Tajikistan, Azerbaijan, Moldova, Kazakhstan, Kyrgyzstan, Armenia, Belarus
18	Houston metropolitan area	United States	1,113,875	Mexico, El Salvador, Vietnam, India, Nigeria, China, Honduras, Philippines, Myanmar, Guatemala, Colombia
19	Metropolitan Dubai	United Arab Emirates	1,056,000	India, Pakistan, Bangladesh, Philippines, Iran, Sri Lanka, United Kingdom
20	Riyadh (city only)	Saudi Arabia	1,054,000	Arab League, Pakistan, India, African Union, Bangladesh, Iran
21	Washington metropolitan area	United States	1,017,432	El Salvador, China, Ethiopia, Mexico, South Korea, Nigeria, Philippines, Vietnam, Ghana, Bolivia
22	Dallas–Fort Worth metroplex	United States	1,016,221	Mexico, India, Vietnam, El Salvador, China, South Korea, Honduras, Philippines
23	Frankfurt Urban Area	Germany	998,400	Turkey, Italy, Croatia, Poland, Romania, Bulgaria, Serbia, Greece, Russia, North Macedonia
24	Tokyo Urban Area	Japan	978,172	China, South Korea, Philippines, Vietnam, United States, Brazil, Nepal, Taiwan, Peru, Thailand
25	Santiago Metropolitan Region	Chile	938,904	Venezuela, Peru, Colombia, Haiti, Argentina
26	Birmingham Urban Area	United Kingdom	902,438	India, Pakistan, Jamaica, Trinidad and Tobago, Poland, Bangladesh, Romania, China, Italy, Albania, Nigeria, Somalia
27	Barcelona Urban Area	Spain	862,200	Italy, Pakistan, China, Ecuador, Bolivia, Morocco, France, Honduras, Argentina
28	Atlanta metropolitan area	United States	861,208	Mexico, India, Jamaica, South Korea, China, Vietnam, Nigeria, Guatemala, El Salvador, Colombia
29	Brisbane Greater Capital City Statistical Area	Australia	731,198	New Zealand, England, China, India, South Africa, Philippines, Vietnam, South Korea, Taiwan, Scotland, Malaysia
30	Stockholm County	Sweden	681,538	Iraq, Finland, Poland, Iran, Syria, Turkey, India, Ukraine, China, Eritrea, Afghanistan, Eritrea, Chile, Somalia, Pakistan, Germany, United Kingdom, Russia, Thailand, Ethiopia, Greece, United States, Romania
31	Auckland Urban Area	New Zealand	662,298	United Kingdom, China, India, Fiji, Samoa, Philippines, South Korea, Sri Lanka
32	Muscat	Oman	571,000	Philippines, Pakistan, Indonesia, Sri Lanka, Bangladesh
33	Amsterdam metropolitan area	Netherlands	554,530	Morocco, Turkey, Suriname, Poland, Ghana, Ukraine, Syria, Afghanistan, Germany, India, Curacao
34	Madrid	Spain	512,218	Ecuador, Venezuela, Paraguay, Morocco, Dominican Republic, Colombia, Peru
35	Calgary Metropolitan Region	Canada	488,740	India, Pakistan, Philippines, United States, Nigeria, China, Lebanon, Vietnam, United Kingdom, South Korea, Iran, Hong Kong, Ethiopia, Germany, European Union
36	Milan Urban Area	Italy	475,000	Egypt, Philippines, China, Romania, Sri Lanka
37	Edmonton Metropolitan Region	Canada	389,490	China, Pakistan, India, Somalia, Hong Kong, Philippines, Lebanon
38	National Capital Region (Canada)	Canada	349,005	Italy, Pakistan, India
39	Phoenix	United States	346,430	Mexico, Guatemala, Philippines, Germany, Romania, Vietnam, Bosnia and Herz., Ethiopia
40	Hamburg Metropolitan Region	Germany	332,473	Turkey, Poland, Portugal, Romania, Russia, Italy, Spain, Ghana
41	San Diego	United States	325,819	Philippines, China, Mexico
42	Greater Manchester	United Kingdom	302,000	Pakistan, China, Ireland, Bangladesh, Poland, Nigeria, India, Somalia, Jamaica, Iraq
43	Winnipeg Metropolitan Region	Canada	238,170	China, United Kingdom, Lebanon, United States, India, Philippines, Vietnam, Pakistan, Syria, Haiti, Iran, Somalia, Egypt, Italy, Iraq, DR Congo, Germany, Jamaica, Russia, Hong Kong
44	Helsinki	Finland	213,290	Russia, Estonia, Somalia, Iraq, Sweden, China, Yugoslavia, Vietnam, India, Turkey
45	Philadelphia	United States	179,444	Ukraine, China, Dominican Republic, Liberia, Vietnam, Jamaica, Mexico
46	Boston	United States	161,740	China, Haiti, Dominican Republic, Brazil, Cape Verde, Russia, India
47	Hannover–Braunschweig–Göttingen–Wolfsburg Metropolitan Region	Germany	132,684	Turkey, Serbia, Ukraine, Greece, Russia, Italy, Spain
48	Seattle	United States	105,154	China, Mexico, Somalia, South Korea, Philippines, Russia, Colombia, Ukraine
49	Charlotte	United States	96,734	China, Venezuela, El Salvador, Mexico, India, Honduras
50	Denver	United States	95,985	Mexico, India, Vietnam, Russia, Germany, Ethiopia, Guatemala
51	Geneva	Switzerland	77,602	France, Spain, Germany

== Cities with largest foreign born populations ==
Rank	City	Country	Region	Estimate date and source (where available)	Foreign-born population	Percentage	Country of origin of the largest foreign-born group
1	London	United Kingdom	Northern Europe	ONS 2021	3,576,000	40.6%	India
2	Dubai	United Arab Emirates	Greater Middle East	Government of Dubai 2021	3,200,000	91.4%	India
3	New York	United States	North America	2022 ACS	3,133,149	36.3%	Dominican Republic
4	Sydney	Australia	Oceania	2021 Australian Census	2,260,410	43.2%	China
5	Abu Dhabi	United Arab Emirates	Greater Middle East	2014	2,173,000	80%	India
6	Kuwait City	Kuwait	Greater Middle East	2018	2,088,000	69.6%	India
7	Melbourne	Australia	Oceania	2021 Australian Census	1,970,614	40.1%	India
8	Doha	Qatar	Greater Middle East	2021	1,768,000	88.4%	India
9	Lima	Peru	South America	2023 United Nations Office of Peru	1,586,880	17.5%	Venezuela
10	Toronto	Canada	North America	2021 Canadian census	1,431,380	51.9%	India
11	Los Angeles	United States	North America	2022 ACS	1,395,920	36.0%	Mexico
12	Perth	Australia	Oceania	2021 Australian Census	858,141	40.5%	England
13	Brisbane	Australia	Oceania	2021 Australian Census	799,645	31.7%	New Zealand
14	Montréal	Canada	North America	2021 Canadian census	790,960	40.9%	France
15	Berlin	Germany	Western Europe	Berlin-Brandenburg office of statistics, 2021	789,076	21%	Turkey
16	Vienna	Austria	Western Europe	City of Vienna 2023	778,454	31.3%	Serbia
17	Madrid	Spain	Southern Europe	2019 Spain Census	726,669	22.2%	Morocco
18	Auckland	New Zealand	Oceania	Statistics New Zealand 2018	714,480	41.6%	India
19	Houston	United States	North America	2022 ACS	664,495	28.9%	Mexico
20	Peshawar	Pakistan	Greater Middle East	2005	611,501	19.7	Afghanistan
21	Bogotá	Colombia	South America	2026	600,000	7.5%	Venezuela
22	Chicago	United States	North America	2022 ACS	550,888	20.2%	Mexico
23	Calgary	Canada	North America	2021 Canadian census	457,665	35.4%	Philippines
24	Adelaide	Australia	Oceania	2021 Australian Census	434,090	31.3%	England
25	San Jose	United States	North America	2022 ACS	410,543	41.0%	Mexico
26	Mississauga	Canada	North America	2021 Canadian census	406,455	57%	India
27	Brampton	Canada	North America	2021 Canadian census	383,695	59.1%	India
28	São Paulo	Brazil	South America	2019	362,340	3%	Venezuela
29	San Diego	United States	North America	2022 ACS	344,419	24.9%	Mexico
30	Edmonton	Canada	North America	2021 Canadian census	348,295	34.9%	India
31	Hamburg	Germany	Western Europe	2021 ACS	341,759	24.7%	Turkey
32	Milan	Italy	Southern Europe	Istat 2011	324,378	10.7%	Egypt
33	Vancouver	Canada	North America	2021 Canadian census	317,190	48.8%	China
34	Birmingham	United Kingdom	Northern Europe	ONS 2021	305,963	25.6%	Pakistan
35	Ottawa	Canada	North America	2021 Canadian census	288,835	28.9%	China
36	San Francisco	United States	North America	2022 ACS	288,169	33.9%	China
37	Surrey	Canada	North America	2021 Canadian census	285,620	50.8%	India
38	Amsterdam	Netherlands	Western Europe	Statistics Netherlands 2019	277,431	32.1%	Turkey
39	Miami	United States	North America	2022 ACS	256,805	57.9%	Cuba
40	Stockholm	Sweden	Northern Europe	Statistics Sweden 2019	248,708	25.5%	Syria
41	Medellín	Colombia	South America	2024	240,000	10%	Venezuela
42	Lyon	France	Western Europe	France Unité urbaine de Lyon, INSEE 2020	235,969	14%	Algeria
43	Winnipeg	Canada	North America	2021 Canadian census	231,135	31.4%	India
44	Cúcuta	Colombia	South America	2024	220,000	28%	Venezuela
45	Santiago	Chile	South America	2017 Census	212,037	10.2%	Venezuela
46	Marseille	France	Western Europe	Unité urbaine de Marseille-Aix, INSEE 2020	193,740	12%	Algeria
47	Rotterdam	Netherlands	Western Europe	Statistics Netherlands 2019	184,218	28.6%	Turkey
48	Barranquilla	Colombia	South America	2025	182,000	14%	Venezuela
49	Cali	Colombia	South America	2023	180,000	7.83	Venezuela
50	The Hague	Netherlands	Western Europe	Statistics Netherlands 2019	176,183	32.8%	Indonesia
51	Manchester	United Kingdom	Northern Europe	ONS 2021	173,208	31.4%	Pakistan
52	Oslo	Norway	Northern Europe	Statistics Norway 2019	171,868	25.2%	Pakistan
53	Gothenburg	Sweden	Northern Europe	Statistics Sweden 2019	159,342	27.5%	Iraq
54	Hamilton	Canada	North America	2021 Canadian census	158,190	28.2%	Italy
55	Canberra	Australia	Oceania	2021 Australian Census	156,895	32%	India
56	Copenhagen	Denmark	Northern Europe	Statistics Denmark 2022	134,409	26.3%	Turkey
57	Malmö	Sweden	Northern Europe	Statistics Sweden 2019	118,323	34.4%	Iraq
58	Helsinki	Finland	Northern Europe	Statistics Finland 2021	102,016	15.5%	Russia

== See also ==
- Alien (law)
- Expatriate
- Immigration
- Naturalization
- Finishing school
- Foreign-born Japanese
- Immigrant generations
