= Karachi language =

Karachi language may refer to:

- the language spoken by the Muhajir people
- a language spoken in the city of Karachi: Urdu language
