= Daily Qaumi Bandhan =

Pakistani Newspaper

- Founded: 1940; 86 years ago
- Ceased publication: 1979
- Language: Bengali
- Headquarters: Chittagong Colony
- City: Karachi
- Country: Pakistan

Daily Qaumi Bandhan (Bengali: দৈনিক কওমি বন্ধন; lit. "national unity") was a Bengali language newspaper published in Karachi, Sindh, Pakistan. It has the reputation of being the only main Bengali newspaper in the country that catered specifically to the large Bengali community in Pakistan. Founded in the 1940s, the newspaper was discontinued decades later due to financial reasons. It was based in the Chittagong Colony, a Bengali neighbourhood in Karachi.

== See also ==
- List of newspapers in Pakistan
