= Sufiyan Yousuf =

Pakistani politician

Member of the National Assembly of Pakistan
- In office 2008 – 31 May 2018
- Constituency: NA-247 (Karachi-IX)

Personal details
- Born: 28 June 1978 (age 47) Karachi, Sindh, Pakistan

Sufiyan Yousuf (Urdu: سفیان یوسف; born 28 June 1978) is a Pakistani politician who had been a member of the National Assembly of Pakistan, from 2008 to May 2018.

== Early life ==
He was born on 28 June 1978 in Karachi. Early education was from Habib Public School Karachi. HSC from DJ Science College BE Civil Engineering From Sir Syed University Karachi. MBA in Human Resources from United Kingdom Masters in Roads & Highway From United Kingdom.

== Political career ==
He was elected to the National Assembly of Pakistan as a candidate of Muttahida Qaumi Movement (MQM) from Constituency NA-246 (Karachi-VIII) in the 2008 Pakistani general election. He received 186,933 votes and defeated Sohail Ansar, a candidate of Pakistan Peoples Party (PPP).

He was re-elected to the National Assembly as a candidate of MQM from Constituency NA-247 (Karachi-IX) in the 2013 Pakistani general election. He received 126,263 votes and defeated Rashid Siddiqui, a candidate of Pakistan Tehreek-e-Insaf (PTI).

In 2016, he announced to resign from his National Assembly seat. However, as of February 2018, he remained a member of the legislature. MQM asked Election Commission of Pakistan to de-seat him.
