= Rohingya refugees in Pakistan =

Ethnic Rohingyas from Myanmar in Pakistan

Rohingya people in Pakistan
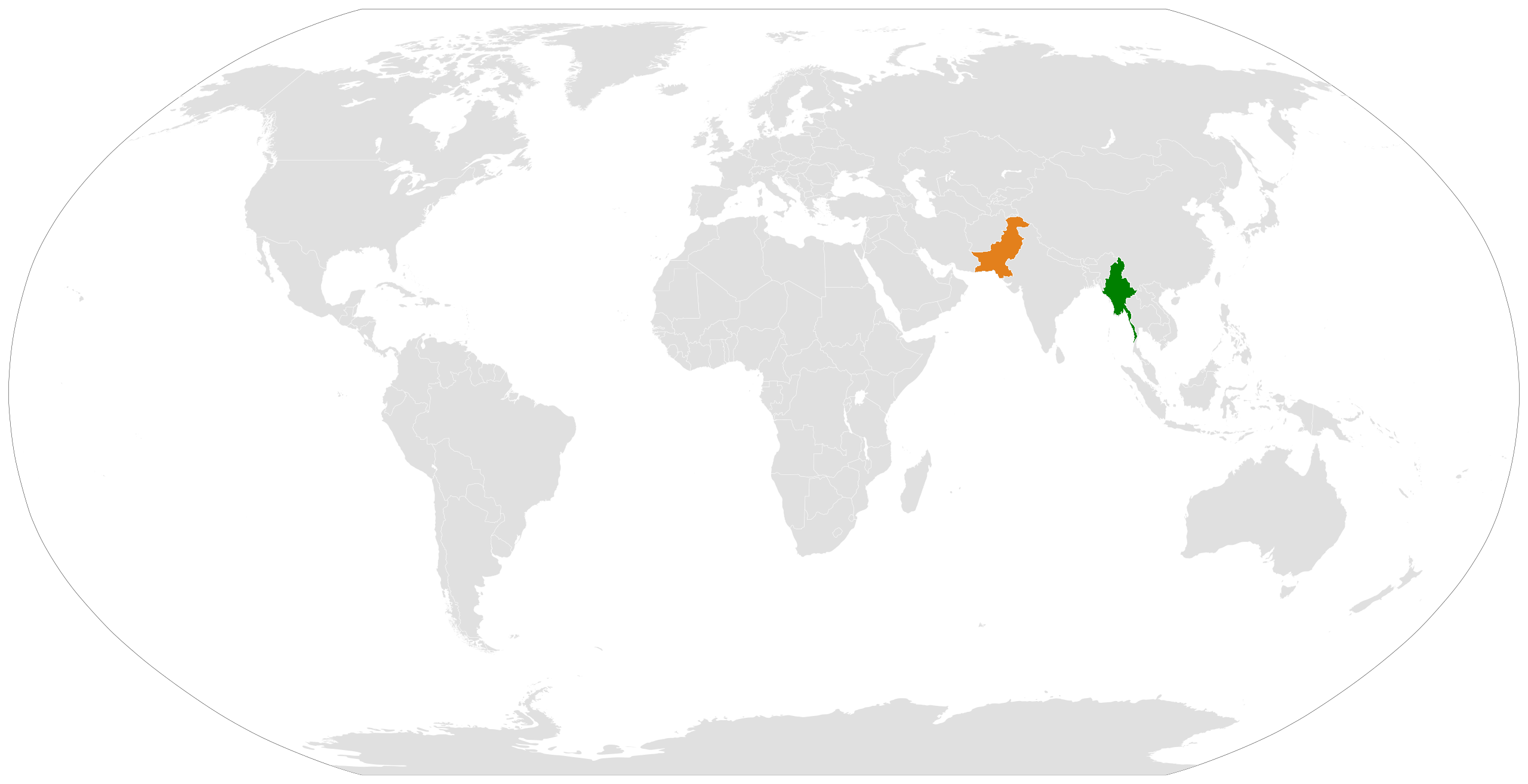
- Pakistan (orange) and Myanmar (green) on a map

Total population
- 200,000–400,000

Regions with significant populations
- Karachi and Hyderabad.

Languages
- Rohingya · Burmese · Chittagonian · Urdu · English and other Myanmar languages

Religion
- Islam

Related ethnic groups
- Burmese diaspora

Rohingya people in Pakistan (Urdu: پاکستانی برمی) are a community based in Karachi, Sindh, Pakistan. They are Rohingya Muslims (Urdu: روہنگیا مسلمان), an ethnic group native to Rakhine State, Myanmar (also known as Arakan, Burma), who have fled their homeland because of the persecution of Muslims by the Burmese government and Buddhist majority. According to varied Pakistani government sources and the Arakan Historical Society, there are some 200,000 Rohingya refugees residing in Pakistan. All of them have made a perilous journey across Bangladesh and India and have settled in Karachi. A report on human trafficking stated that Burmese people make up fourteen per cent of Karachi's undocumented immigrants. Large scale Rohingya migration to Karachi made Karachi one of the largest population centres of Rohingyas in the world after Myanmar. In the recent years, scores of Burmese women seeking employment have entered the country. Different resources cite the number of these women to be in the thousands.

== Rohingyas and Bengalis in Karachi ==
According to community leaders and social scientists, there are over 1.6 million Bengalis and up to 400,000 Rohingyas living in Karachi. There are numerous Burmese housing colonies that can be found throughout Karachi. Traditionally, cultural similarities of the Rohingya people to those of Bengalis has enabled easier communication and interaction of the Burmese in Karachi with the Bengali community. Their native Rohingya language furthermore has dialect familiarities especially with the Bangladeshi natives hailing from Chittagong, who speak a somewhat indistinct Chittagonian language. As a result of the great inter-ethnic engagement, the Burmese people in Pakistan have a special reputation for being found in areas only that traditionally also contain a Bengali population. With more stringent control and difficulty in traversing borders the Burmese have now started travelling east to countries closer to Myanmar such as Thailand, Cambodia, Bangladesh, Vietnam and Malaysia. The Rohingya population in Pakistan has been declining in recent years.

== Notable people ==
- Ataullah abu Ammar Jununi - Founder and leader of Arakan Rohingya Salvation Army (ARSA)
- Ashraf Tai — Burmese muslim and pioneer of Bando karate in Pakistan.

== See also ==
- Burmee Colony, a Rohingya-majority neighbourhood in Karachi
- Pakistanis in Myanmar
- Bengalis in Pakistan
