= Chittagonian =

Chittagonian may refer to:

- A connection to or inhabitant of Chittagong, Bangladesh
- Chittagonian language, an Indo-Aryan language of Chittagong, closely related to Bengali

== See also ==
- Chittagong (disambiguation)
