= Muhajir Cultural Day =

Muhajir cultural festival

Muhajir Cultural Day مہاجر یوم ثقافت
- Official name: Muhajir Culture Day - اردو: مہاجر یوم ثقافت
- Observed by: Muhajirs
- Liturgical color: Red, White
- Type: Ethnic
- Significance: Honors the Heritage, Culture and Civilization of Muhajirs
- Celebrations: Urdu music; Historical & Cultural exhibitions; Rememberence of History of Muhajirs; Singing Muhajir songs and Muhajir poetry; Family & social gatherings
- Date: 24 December
- Next time: 24 December 2026
- Frequency: Annual
- First time: 24 December 2020
- Started by: Muhajir Nation

Muhajir Cultural Day is a Muhajir cultural festival. It is celebrated to highlight the modern Muhajirs.The day is celebrated all over Karachi and amongst the Muhajir diaspora worldwide. Muhajirs celebrate this day to demonstrate their identity and culture and acquire the attention of the world towards their heritage.

On this day, people gather in Karachi at press clubs and other places to arrange various activities. Literary (poetic) gatherings, musical concerts, seminars, lecture programs and rallies are also held.

Political, social and religious organizations of Karachi organize a variety of events to mark this annual festivity. Muhajir culture, history and heritage are highlighted at the events.

== History ==
=== 2020 ===
A rally, held under the banner of Nojawanan-e-Karachi And Team Muhajir Pakistan, a non-political youth organization led By Barrister Hasan Khan Zohaib Khan Ahsan Khan and Ahsan Qureshi, started from Karimabad and culminated at the Mazar-e-Quaid.

=== 2021 ===
Rallies were held in different parts of the city, with a large number of people, mostly youngsters. A rally was held from Karimabad to the mausoleum of Quaide Azam under the auspices of Nojawan e Muhajir. The rally was led by organizers Zohaib Azam, Barrister Hassan Khan, Umair Maqsoodi, Zohaib Khan, Qazi Shahbaz Ahmed, Shujaat Qazi, Faiz Ali Khan, Fahad Premier & Ahsan Khan. Rally participants were dressed according to the occasion of Muhajir Day.Its main camp was set up in Karimabad to host the markazi rally for 24 December, while the first camp in Gulistan-e-Johar was established by Ahsan Khan to celebrate this day city-wide.

Furthermore, from Hyderabad, Pakistan, a rally, held under the banner of Team Muhajir Hyderabad youth group, started from (Khuda Hafiz board) Unit no 11 Latifabad to Hyderabad Press Club. Hyderabad, Sindh rally organizers. Muhammad Asad. Kabir Sheikh. Mosin Bhai. Zahid Yaseen. Umar Hussain.

=== 2023 ===
Preparations to hold the annual rally for Muhajir Culture Day were started 3 months prior to the day of execution. Meeting were held with Muhajirs in localities and areas like Gulshan e Iqbal, Bufferzone, Gulberg, FB Area, Gulistan e Jauhar and all over Karachi. Young and zealous Muhajirs made plans for rallies that were held in localities and then merged with the central rally at the rally point Karimabad Jamat Khana Point, from there the central rally led by Central Organizers Zohaib Azam, Faaiz Ali Khan, Umair Amir Maqsoodi and Central Members of various areas took off shouting slogans like Nara e Muhajir Jiye Muhajir and playing songs that Naujawanan e Muhajir released prior to the rally. People of different age group were present there wearing the ethnic clothing of Muhajirs including Pajama Kurta, Rupali Topi, Kolhapuri etc. Rally was maintained by the Security Chief Abdul Ahad with constant feverous speeches being given throughout the rally by Central Organizer Zohaib Azam that were received with patriotic fervour by the attendees. Rally Ended at Daakh Khana in Liaquatabad Town. After which they dispersed so the traffic could flow smoothly.
