= Mohammad Aslam Khan (Karachi politician) =

Pakistani politician

Member of the National Assembly of Pakistan
- In office 13 August 2018 – 17 January 2023
- Constituency: NA-254 (Karachi Central-II)

Personal details
- Born: Karachi, Sindh, Pakistan

Mohammad Aslam Khan (Urdu: محمد اسلم خان) is a Pakistani politician who had been a member of the National Assembly of Pakistan from August 2018 till January 2023.

== Political career ==
He was elected to the National Assembly of Pakistan from Constituency NA-254 (Karachi Central-II) as a candidate of Pakistan Tehreek-e-Insaf in the 2018 Pakistani general election.

=== Resignation ===
In April 2022, he also resigned from the National Assembly seat along with all PTI members after the successful no-confidence motion against Imran Khan. Like most PTI MNAs, his resignation had not been immediately accepted.

His resignation was accepted on 17 January 2023.

On 29 May 2023, he resigned from the PTI due to the 2023 Pakistani protests.

== More Reading ==
- List of members of the 15th National Assembly of Pakistan
- List of Pakistan Tehreek-e-Insaf elected members (2013–2018)
- No-confidence motion against Imran Khan
