= Muhajir culture =

Culture based in Karachi, Pakistan

Muhajir culture (Urdu: مہاجر ثقافت) is the culture of the various Muslims of different ethnicities who migrated mainly from North India (after the partition of British India and subsequent establishment of the Dominion of Pakistan) in 1947 & (after the partition of East Pakistan and West Pakistan) in 1971, generally to Karachi, the federal capital of Pakistan before 1960 and now the provincial capital of Sindh. Muhajirs consist of various sects, ethnicities and linguistic groups, but most have Urdu as their native language and culture. They are mainly concentrated in urban Sindh and Islamabad. According to 2023 Pakistani census Muhajirs are the fifth-largest ethnic group of Pakistan with 9.25%.

== Cuisine ==
Muhajir cuisine refers to the cuisine of the muhajir people and is covered under both Indian and Pakistani cuisines. Muhajirs, after arriving in Karachi, have revived their old culture, including numerous desserts, savory dishes, and beverages. The Mughal and Indo-Iranian heritage played an influential role in the making of their cuisine and therefore Muhajir cuisine tends to use royal cuisine specific to the old royal Muslim dynasties of now defunct states in ancient India.

== Traditional dress ==
The traditional clothing of Muhajirs is the traditional clothing worn by Muslims in Indo-Islamicate North India, and it has both Muslim and South Asia influences. Kurta, pyjama and waistcoats symbolizes the quintessential traditional attire of muhajir men. Other traditional dresses for Muhajirs include the sherwani for men, which is believed to have been introduced to Pakistan by Muhajirs; the sari for women, which is an unstitched stretch of woven fabric arranged over the body like a robe; and the gharara for women, which originated from the nawabs' attempt to imitate the British evening gown.

== Festivals ==
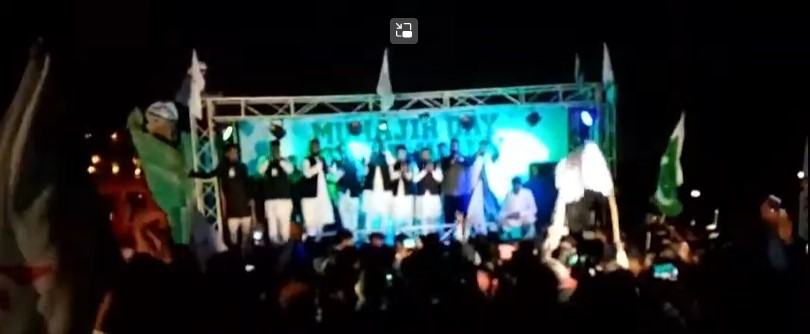
A Muhajir Cultural Day rally outside Mazar-e-Quaid, Karachi

Festivals celebrated by Muhajirs include religious, political, ethnic, and national festivals. Islamic festivals which are celebrated by Muhajirs include the two official holidays: Eid al-Fitr, celebrating the end of Ramzan; and Eid al-Adha, honoring the obedience and sacrifice of Abraham. Depending on sect, some Muhajirs may also commemorate Mawlid, or the birthday of Muhammad; and Ashura, the day of the death of Husayn ibn Ali and the day of salvation for Moses and the Israelites from Biblical Egypt.

Political celebrations include MQM Founding Day to mark the founding of the first Muhajir nationalist party Muttahida Qaumi Movement, the architect of Muhajir political identity, and APMSO Founding Day, to mark the founding of the first Muhajir nationalist student union All Pakistan Muhajir Students Organization. Muhajirs celebrate Muhajir Cultural Day as an ethnic and cultural festival. To celebrate this day, rallies depart from all areas of Karachi to the Mazar-e-Quaid, and political parties and civil society organisations set up their camps to welcome participants in the rally and to express solidarity. Mushairas, a traditional urdu poetry gathering in which poets publicly recite their work, and Qawwali, a form of sufi islamic devotional singing, both originating from North India, is practiced on cultural day.

== See also ==
- Muhajir people
