= Satya Prakash Singha =

Politician of British India and Pakistan

Dewan Bahadur Satya Prakash Singha (1893–1948) was a politician of colonial India, and later, Pakistan, who served as the Speaker of the British Indian Punjab assembly. He was member of the Punjab Assembly between 1947 and 1948.

== Early life and family ==
He was born to a Christian family in Pasrur, Sialkot in 1893 with ancestry of a Bihari grandfather and a Bengali grandmother. His father was a Punjabi and he married a woman from the United Provinces (UP) of British India.

== Career ==
He served as registrar in the Punjab University. Due to his efforts matric examination system and intermediate level degrees were introduced to education system in colonial India. In his recognition for his services, he was awarded the distinction of Dewan Bahadur by the British Indian government.

The majority of Indian Christians, represented by the All India Conference of Indian Christians, were allies of the Indian National Congress, and opposed the partition of India. However, Singha was present when the Lahore Resolution was passed in March of 1940, a resolution which called for British-India to be divided into independent states. In 1942, Singha created his own All-Indian Christian Association, and in November that year when the Muslim League held its annual convention in Faisalabad, it assured Jinnah of Indian Christian solidarity in the creation of Pakistan. Soon after this, Singha said in a public statement: "At the time of partition of the sub-continent of India, in the entire country, the Christians should be counted with Muslims." In November of 1946 at another gathering in the Punjab, Singha declared that "Jinnah is our leader", and Jinnah responded by saying: "We will never forget the favours and sacrifices of Christians." In Punjab, a "rival Christian group led by Mr Banerjee argued that they wanted a united India but, if partition took place, then they would want to be in India." In reality, "Christians of the Punjab [were] demographically hamstrung, as regardless what side they wanted to support, they were mainly present in Muslim majority areas."

With partition imminent, Singha was appointed as Speaker of the Punjab Assembly, who advocated that Punjab be included with Pakistan. The Assembly met in June of 1947 to decide the question, and an armed Sikh leader announced that he would attack anyone who voted in favour of Punjab uniting with Pakistan. Ishtiaq Ahmed writes that:

Accordingly the members of the Punjab Legislative Assembly, organised separately into the Muslim-majority western bloc and Hindu-Sikh majority eastern bloc (based on a notional basis in accordance with the 1941 census), voted on 23 June on the question of partitioning the province. The voting of the western bloc was presided over by the Christian speaker of the assembly, Dewan Bahadur S. P. Singha, while Deputy Speaker Sardar Kapur Singh presided over the vote of the eastern bloc. The western bloc (comprising 17 districts of Punjab) rejected a motion to partition the Punjab by 69 votes to 27 while the eastern bloc (comprising 12 districts) rejected by 50 votes to 22 a motion by the Muslim League leader, the Khan of Mamdot, to keep the province united. Therefore, no tie occurred in the Punjab Assembly that Singha's vote could tilt decisively in favour of Pakistan.

As Speaker of the Punjab Assembly in British India, Singha oversaw a pivotal vote on whether the province's legislators would join the existing Constituent Assembly or a new and separate one. In an unprecedented move, Singha entered the lobby for the first time in the Assembly's history to cast his vote, in favour of a new constituent assembly.

Following the partition and the creation of Pakistan in 1947, Singha was informed that only a Muslim could hold the position of Speaker of the Assembly. A motion of no confidence was subsequently passed, leading to his removal from office. However, despite early hardship and accusations during Partition, West Punjab's 400,000 Christians saw improved conditions under S.P. Singha's leadership, including a 5% quota in provincial services. Still, lacking representation in the Constituent Assembly, they have called for separate electorates until inclusive political alternatives to the Muslim League emerge.

He died in 1948, largely forgotten and in disgrace. A decade later, in 1958, his family—having endured years of marginalisation and humiliation, emigrated to independent India, a stark departure from the inclusive vision Singha had once held for Pakistan.

== Legacy ==
In 2016, a Pakistani postal stamp was issued in his honour.
