= Ikram Sehgal =

Pakistani defence analyst, army officer and security expert

- Born: 18 July 1946 (age 80)
- Military career
- Allegiance: Pakistan
- Branch: Pakistan Army
- Service years: 1964 – 1974
- Rank: Major
- Unit: Pakistan Army Corps of Aviation
- Conflicts: Indo-Pakistani War of 1965; Bangladesh Liberation War; Indo-Pakistani War of 1971; Operation in Balochistan 1973–74
- Other work: Businessman, Defence analyst on Pakistan television news shows military writer in newspapers

Ikram Sehgal (Urdu: اکرام سہگل; Bengali: ইকরাম সেহগাল) is a Pakistani defence analyst and security expert. He is a retired Pakistan Army officer.

== Personal life ==
Sehgal was born to a Punjabi father and Urdu-speaking Bengali mother. On his mother's side, Bengali politicians Huseyn Shaheed Suhrawardy and J.A. Rahim were his grandmother's first cousins.

== Early life and education ==
Sehgal spent his entire childhood, adolescence and education in the former East Pakistan, i.e. today's Bangladesh. His father was a commanding officer of the 2nd East Bengal Regiment. When 2nd East Bengal Regiment was in Comilla, he studied in a convent school there. He spent several years of his school life in Comilla. His college life started in Sylhet. His father was then the Sector Commander of EPR in Sylhet. He was admitted to MC College, Sylhet. Later he was admitted to Notre Dame College in Dhaka. From there he joined the Pakistan Military Academy in Kakul in 1964 as a cadet of the 34 PMA Long Course.

== Military career ==
Ikram Sehgal graduated from the Pakistan Military Academy (PMA), Kakul, in October 1965. Commissioned into 2E Bengal (Junior Tigers), he served the regiment till 1968, before qualifying as a pilot in Army Aviation, where he served from 1968 to 1971.

When Operation Searchlight broke out and the Bengali population of East Pakistan was being persecuted, Captain Ikram Sehgal revolted with Bengali officers and soldiers and killed Pakistan Army personnel in March 1971 and escaped into India. He alleges he then became a Prisoner of War (POW) in April 1971, while in East Pakistan and was sent to the Panagarh POW Camp in India. In July 1971, Sehgal escaped from the prison. He became the first Pakistani Prisoner of War to escape from an Indian POW camp. Allegations have followed that he was a Mukti Bahini rebel and an Indian intelligence spy during the 1971 war.

Sehgal was posted to 44 Punjab (now 4 Sindh) in November 1971. He saw action as company commander in the Thar Desert, receiving a ‘battlefield promotion’ to the rank of major on 13 December 1971. He took part in counter–guerrilla operations in Balochistan in 1973. He later worked as a commercial pilot.

== Business career ==
He set up a business in 1977, specializing in trading and counter trade. He is currently chairman, Pathfinder Group Pakistan, which includes two of the country's largest private security companies.

== Leadership ==
Sehgal is also involved in national and international organizations. He is a Member of the World Economic Forum (WEF); International Organization for Migration (IOM); director, East West Institute (EWI), a US-based think-tank; and member, WEF Global Agenda Council (GAC) for counter-terrorism.

Khalid Ahmad wrote in The Express Tribune that he held "outspoken views" on the conduct of the armed forces during the Bangladesh Liberation War, which ultimately led to the secession of East Pakistan.

When soldiers make war on women and children, they cease to be soldiers. That is why in the final analysis, when it came to real combat, they could not face up to bullets which is their actual job as soldiers … the terror that was unleashed by them in East Pakistan between March and November 1971 is simply inexcusable.

— Ikram Sehgal,

However, India Today noted that he had written only in 1998:

The army action in East Pakistan was professionally correct and it was carried out with surgical precision... The major part of the army behaved as professional soldiers.

— Ikram Sehgal,

That was before the Hamoodur Rahman Commission report became public.

== Later life ==
He is a regular contributor of articles in newspapers that include: The News and the Urdu daily Jang. He appears regularly on current affairs programs on television as a ‘defense and security analyst’.
