= Chittagong Court Building =

Building in Chattogram, Bangladesh

Coordinates: 22.3348333°N 91.8346140°E

Chattogram Court Building
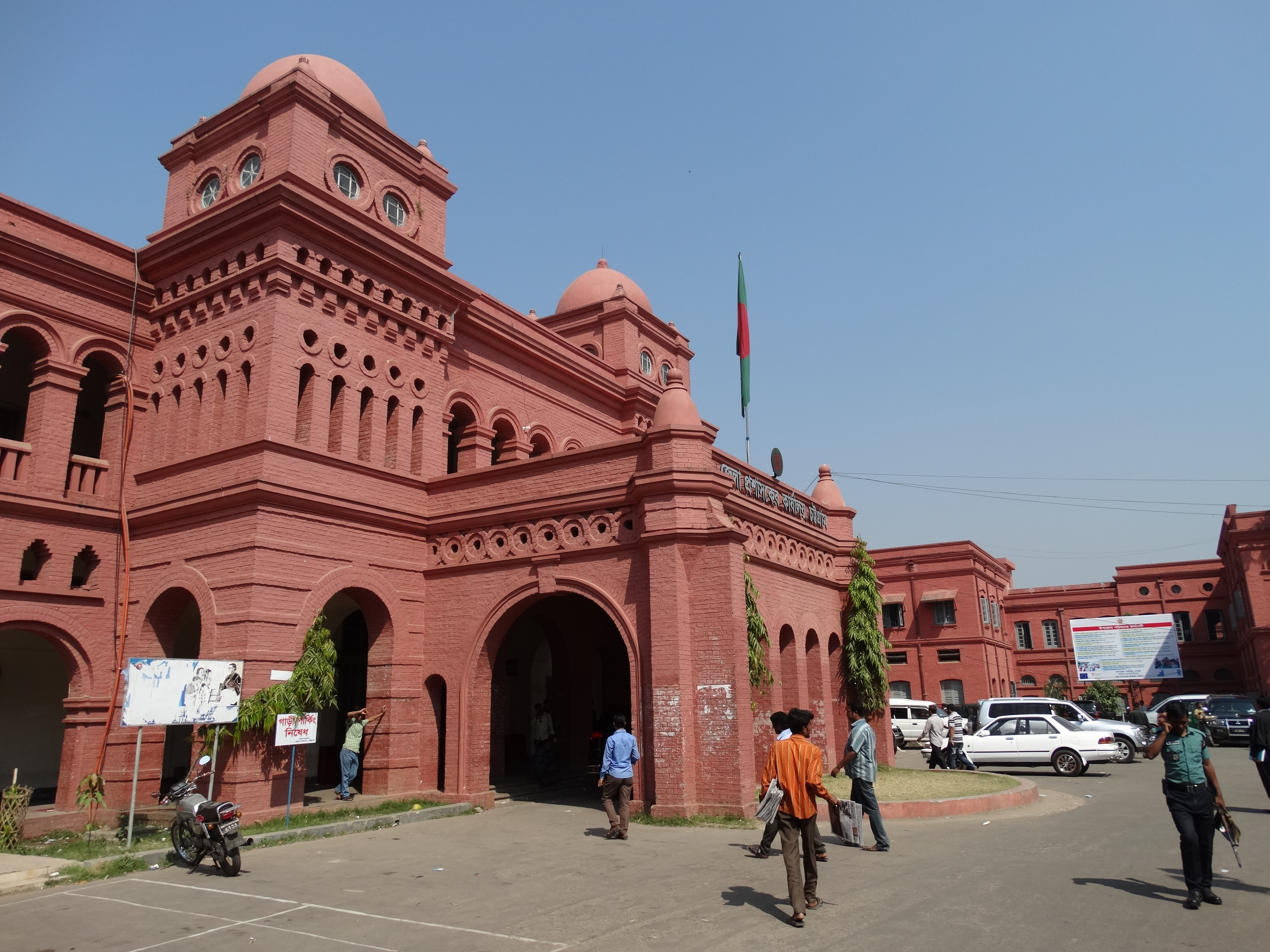
- Interactive map of the Chattogram Court Building area

General information
- Architectural style: Indo-Saracenic architecture
- Construction started: 1892
- Completed: 1898

Chattogram Court Building is a historic court house in Chattogram, Bangladesh.

== History ==
Construction was started in 1892 and was completed in 1898. It was built on the top of the hill Parir Pahar (Fairy's Hill). The building was built in the Indo-Saracenic Revival architecture style. The building was built to house the Chittagong District Court.
