= Machar Colony =

Coordinates: 24°52′N 66°59′E

Machar Colony مچھر کالونی مچھیرا کالونی
- Unplanned settlement
- Interactive map of Machar Colony مچھر کالونی مچھیرا کالونی
- Country: Pakistan
- City: Karachi
- District: Keamari

Population
  - Total: 700,000
- Time zone: UTC+5 (PST)
- Postal code: 75300

Machar Colony (Urdu: مچھر کالونی) or Machiara Colony/Mohammadi Colony (Urdu: محمدی کالونی/مچھیرا کالونی) is an unplanned settlement in Karachi, Pakistan, located near the Port of Karachi and Harbour Kemari. The settlement is spread over an area of almost 4 square kilometers, and is home to about 700,000 people. It is considered to be one of the most dilapidated slums in Karachi. Many people are undocumented because they have not been given citizenship by the government of Pakistan; therefore, many people are jobless.

Most people in the neighbourhood are involved in the fishing industry and consequently the area is also known as Fisherman's Colony, with the word Machar derived from the Urdu word for fisherman machera. Residents of Machar Colony are employed by the fishing industry as shrimp peelers, fishermen, fish cleaners, or labourers in the ship breaking industry. Some of their homes are built on stilts over the water. The few flourishing businessmen that the colony has produced are in the fishing business, which is almost exclusively dominated by the Bengalis. A large majority of residents are Pakistani Bengalis, although there are minorities of Afghans, Kutchis, Pashtuns, Punjabis, Rohingya, and Sindhis.

== See also ==
- Bengalis in Pakistan
