= Hussainabad, Karachi =

Residential neighbourhood in Karachi

Coordinates: 24°54′N 67°12′E

Hussainabad (Urdu: حسين آباد) is one of the neighbourhoods of Malir Town in Karachi, Sindh, Pakistan. Another place with the same name also located in Block-3 of F.B. Area, Karachi and famous for its food street, namely Hussainabad Food Street, is mainly populated with Sunni Muslim Memon of Okhai community.

In Hussainabad, the majority of people belong to the Shia sect of Islam, and various majalis (congregations) are organized through the Imambargah Darbaray Hussaini. The main mosque is Hussaini Jama Masjid and Imambargah Darbaray Hussaini, Hussainabad, Malir Town. The population of Malir Town is estimated to be nearly one million.
