= Ashraf Tai =

Pakistani martial artist

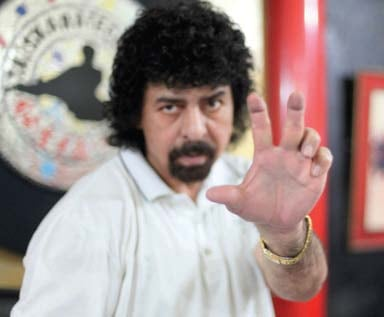
- Born: Muhammad Ashraf Tai; 25 May 1947 (age 79); Sittwe, Burma
- Other names: Ashraf Tai
- Nationality: Pakistani
- Height: 1.72 m (5 ft 8 in)
- Weight: 80 kg (180 lb)
- Division: Lightheavyweight
- Style: Kickboxing, Karate, Bando
- Fighting out of: Pakistan
- Team: Team Tai
- Trainer: Lee Phow Shin
- Rank: Black belt in Bando, 10th Dan
- Years active: 1974–1985

Kickboxing record
- Total: 41
- Wins: 40
- By knockout: 44
- Losses: 1
- By knockout: 1

Amateur record
- Total: 210
- Wins: 199
- Losses: 5
- Draws: 6

Other information
- Occupation: Martial artist

Muhammad Ashraf Tai is a martial arts grandmaster, a 10th degree Dan (Black Belt), the 2-time Afro-Asian Martial Arts Champion (1978-1979), the 9-time Pakistan Karate Champion, and one of the most famous Grandmasters in Pakistan's history.

== Biography ==
Ashraf Tai was born on 1947 in a Burmese Muslim family and is a direct descendant of Hatim al-Tai. His family left Burma and migrated to East Pakistan (now Bangladesh) after the government there nationalised everything and all assets owned by the family were consequently taken away. However, after a civil war broke out in East Pakistan, Tai moved to West Pakistan in 1970 and settled in Karachi. He describes his first days in Karachi as having been spent on "looking for work". He came across a person who happened to be a bodybuilder. Having achieved a black belt in the Bando style in Burma at the age 16, it was here where Tai's interest in martial arts sustained. Gradually, he began to teach martial arts to students at Hill Park which improved his financial situation and also promoted his reputation.

As a pioneer of martial arts in Pakistan, he laid the foundation of Pakistan Karate Federation, and succeeded in having the body affiliated with the Pakistan Olympic Association as well as the Pakistan Sports Board. He serves as the Secretary General of the Pakistan Karate Federation.

Having received numerous awards in various continents of the world during his illustrious career, he was declared the International Grand Master of the Year in 2000 by the US International Grandmasters Council, an institution based in the United States. In 2003, Ashraf Tai was awarded the Pride of Performance by President General Pervez Musharraf for his contribution to Karate in Pakistan. In 2012, Ashraf Tai was again awarded the Pride of Performance by President Asif Ali Zardari for his contribution to Karate.

The Bando Karate Centre, founded by Muhammad Ashraf Tai in 1971, has allegedly trained thousands of martial artists. Branches of the Bando Karate Centre function both all over Pakistan and within countries such the United States, England, the United Arab Emirates (UAE), Saudi Arabia, Afghanistan, France, the Netherlands and Bangladesh. Considered to be the pioneer of Bando in Pakistan specifically, Ashraf Tai holds the distinction of claiming the highest degree (10th Dan) in the martial arts history of the country.

== Personal life ==
Ashraf Tai is married to Samina Shah. She is his second wife. They have four children: Maham, Ali, Abbas Tai and Mishal .

== Fight career ==
Tai started karate at the age of 9 with Lee Phow Shin. He got his black belt at the age of 16. He started participating in local tournaments; most of which were professional.

Tai branched off into full-contact karate and kickboxing. After compiling an impressive streak of knockout victories in Pakistan, Ashraf Tai competed in the 1978 Afro-Asia Martial Arts Championship.

He created a sensation by overpowering Stanley Michael of Malaysia in the finals to win the Afro-Asia Championship. A year later, Tai defeated Japan's Koha Yash by a points decision.

After emerging triumphant in a tournament staged in Sri Lanka in 1980, Tai took his undefeated kickboxing record of 45–0–0 (44 knockouts, 33 in the first round) into a title shot at reigning world lightheavyweight kickboxing champion, Don Wilson of the United States.

Tai traveled to Tokyo, Japan to fight Wilson. The title bout was televised live on primetime Japanese network television (ASHAI). 11,000 kickboxing fans attended the championship bout.

In the first round, Ashraf Tai surprised Wilson by attacking from a traditional karate stance; Tai backed up the champion with a spinning back fist. However, in the second round, Don Wilson rebounded and knocked out Tai at 1:56 of the round.

Following his defeat to Don Wilson, Ashraf Tai retired from active competition.

== Professional kickboxing record ==
Result	Record	Opponent	Method	Date	Round	Time	Event	Location	Notes
Loss	45–1–0	(United States) Don Wilson	KO	24 Jun 1981	2	1:56	WKA	Tokyo, Japan	Kickboxing
Win	45-0-0	(Egypt) Muhammad Youssuf	TKO	1981	1			Pakistan	Full-Contact
Win	44-0-0	(Egypt) Muhammad Youssuf	KO	1981	2			Pakistan	Full-Contact
Win	43-0-0	(Pakistan) Mahmout Ali Khan	TKO	1981	1			Pakistan	Full-Contact
Win	42-0-0	(Algeria) Messaoud Hashas	KO	1981	1			Pakistan	Full-Contact
Win	41-0-0	Mohammed Allala	KO	1981	1			Pakistan	Full-Contact
Win	40-0-0	(Pakistan) Mustapha Afakasi	TKO	1981	1			Pakistan	Full-Contact
Win	39-0-0	(Pakistan) Abdul Rahman Benji	TKO	1981	1	0:23		Pakistan	Full-Contact
Win	38-0-0	(Pakistan) Abdul Rahman Benji	TKO	1981	1	0:36		Pakistan	Full-Contact
Win	37-0-0	(Pakistan) Kabir Ali Khan	TKO	1981	1	0:19		Pakistan	Full-Contact
Win	36-0-0	(Turkey) Habib Umrani	TKO	1980	1			Sri Lanka	Full-Contact
Win	35-0-0	(Algeria) Hassan Ahmendani	TKO	1980	2			Sri Lanka	Full-Contact
Win	34-0-0	(Pakistan) Jabbar Bizenjo	TKO	1980	1			Sri Lanka	Full-Contact
Won	33-0-0	(Pakistan) Kabir Rajput	TKO	1980	1	0:16		Sri Lanka	Full-Contact
Win	32-0-0	(Algeria) Mahmout Bouguetaib	TKO	1980	1	0:19		Malaysia	Kickboxing
Win	31-0-0	(Algeria) Makloufi	TKO	1979	1	0:16			Kickboxing
Win	30-0-0	Koha Yash	PTS	1979	3			Malaysia	Kickboxing: Won Afro-Asian Martial Arts Championship
Win	29-0-0	(Australia) Stanley Michael	KO	1978	2		Afro-Asia Championship	Malaysia	Kickboxing: Won Afro-Asian Martial Arts Championship
Win	28-0-0	(Pakistan) Fayaz Tareen	TKO	1978	1			Pakistan	Full-Contact
Win	27-0-0	(Pakistan) Idrees Hussaini	TKO	1978	1			Pakistan	Full-Contact
Win	26-0-0	(Pakistan) Majid Khalol	KO	1978	2			Pakistan	Full-Contact
Win	25-0-0	(Algeria) Messaoud Hashas	KO	1978	3			Pakistan	Full-Contact
Win	24-0-0	(Pakistan) Ghafoor Kakakhel	TKO	1978	1			Pakistan	Full-Contact
Win	23-0-0	(Pakistan) Haider Kalmati	TKO	1978	1			Pakistan	Full-Contact
Win	22-0-0	(Pakistan) Hasan Jarwar	TKO	1978	1			Pakistan	Full-Contact
Win	21-0-0	(Pakistan) Mustapha Abudul-Hafeez	TKO	1977	1			Pakistan	Full-Contact
Win	20-0-0	(Algeria) Messaoud Hashas	KO	1977	3			Pakistan	Full-Contact
Win	19-0-0	(Pakistan) Rahman Benji Benji	KO	1977	3			Pakistan	Full-Contact
Win	18-0-0	(Pakistan) Kaleem Abdul Muhammad	KO	1977	1	0:22		Pakistan	Full-Contact
Win	17-0-0	(Pakistan) Kaleem Abdul Muhammad	KO	1977	2			Pakistan	Full-Contact
Win	16-0-0	(Pakistan) Imran Agha	KO	1977	3			Pakistan	Full-Contact
Win	15-0-0	(Pakistan) Imran Agha	TKO	1977	2			Pakistan	Full-Contact
Win	14-0-0	(Pakistan) Ehtisham Syed	TKO	1977	1			Pakistan	Full-Contact
Won	13-0-0	(Pakistan) Ali Saleem Saleem	KO	1977	1	0:16		Pakistan	Full-Contact
Win	12-0-0	(Pakistan) Lateef Saadi	TKO	1977	1			Pakistan	Full-Contact
Win	11-0-0	(Pakistan) "Tiger"Mohammad Abid	TKO	1976 May 14	1			Pakistan	Full-Contact
Win	10-0-0	(Pakistan) Haroon Ibadulla	TKO	1976	1			Pakistan	Full-Contact
Win	9-0-0	(Pakistan) Kaleem"Frazier"Khan	KO	1976	1			Pakistan	Full-Contact
Win	8-0-0	(Algeria) Messaoud Hashas	KO	1976	2			Pakistan	Full-Contact
Win	7-0-0	(Pakistan) Babar Mudassar	TKO	1976	2			Pakistan	Full-Contact
Win	6-0-0	(Pakistan) Jawad Zaidi	TKO	3 April 1976	1			Pakistan	Full-Contact
Win	5-0-0	(Pakistan) Jawad Zaidi	TKO	1975	1			Pakistan	Full-Contact
Win	4-0-0	(Pakistan) Ali Ben Abdelazie	KO	1975	1			Pakistan	Full-Contact
Win	3-0-0	(Pakistan) Mustapha Afakasi	TKO	1975	1			Pakistan	Full-Contact
Win	2-0-0	(Turkey) Cemal Mahammedi	TKO	1975	1			Pakistan	Full-Contact
Win	1-0-0	(Pakistan) Mohammed Saheb	TKO	1975	1			Pakistan	Full-Contact

== Controversy ==
In 2017, Ashraf Tai admitted that he had received $500,000 for losing an exhibition fight against German opponent Howard Jackson in 1983. However, he went on to clarify that the fight was neither a 'title fight' nor it was fought under Pakistani flag.

Further his wife also claimed that he takes advantages of female pupils problems and narrowly escaped death due to a drug addiction. Ashraf however denied the charge claiming instead that he and his wife are going through a separation.
