= Dastagir Colony =

Coordinates: 24°56′N 66°58′E

Dastagir Society, also called Dastagir Colony (Urdu: دستگیر کالونی), is a residential area in Gulberg Town, in Karachi, Sindh, Pakistan.

Dastagir Society borders Azizabad (Karachi), Yasinabad, Gulshan-e-Iqbal and Block 7 F.B. Area. It comprises block 9, 14, 15 and 16 of F.B. Area. The hospital "Farzana Dawakhana" is in Block 9 along with Dastagir School and Anglo Oriental School. The houses here are mostly of 100 square metres, but there are some 167 square metres houses as well. There is also a Zahid Ali House in Block 15 which is famous in this society. The residents of Dastagir Society are overwhelmingly educated, migrants from India (1947 and later) or their descendants. Other significant population groups are Punjabis, Memons and Ismailis. Dr. Qarni's Hospital and Shadi Baghs (Marriage Gardens) are at the junction of Dastagir with Azizabad and Yasinabad, where other landmarks are Comprehensive High School for Boys (Azizabad) and the Graveyard of Yasinabad. Area Consist with large grounds and park like "T-Ground, TariqMohiddin, UBL sports complex, custom sports complex, coconut ground & Taleem-e-Bagh. The bus routes serving the area are mainly number 6 and 5C. The Minibus routes are N, and N-1. Muhammadi Jama Masjid, Ghosia Jama Masjid, Askari Mosque& Jama Masjid Aqsa Imambargah are examples of large mosques and Imambargahs in Dastagir Society.
