= Water Pump, Karachi =

Residential neighbourhood in Karachi, Pakistan

Water Pump واٹر پمپ
- Neighbourhood
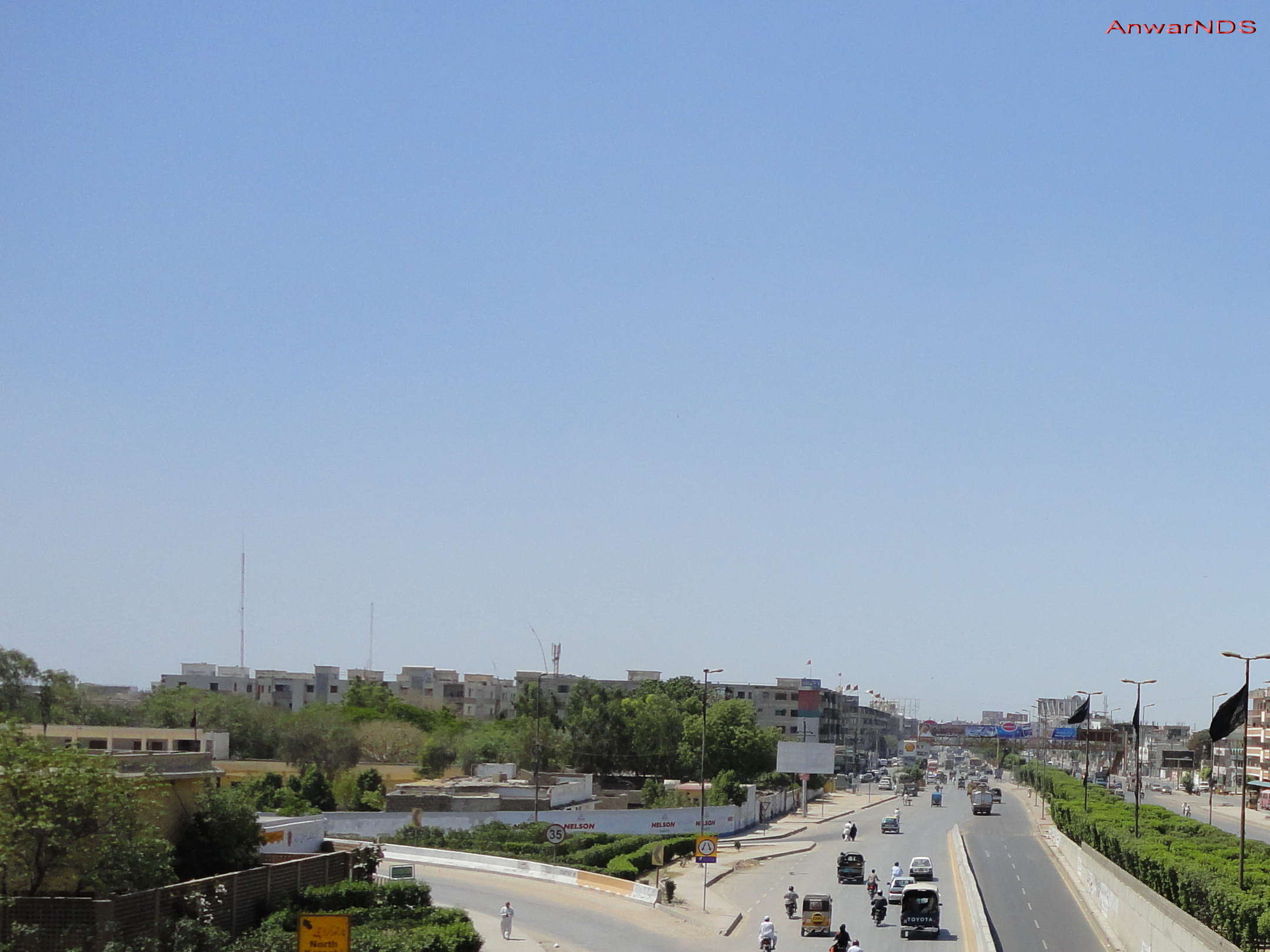
- Water Pump, Karachi
- District: Karachi Central
- City: Karachi
- Country: Pakistan
- Time zone: UTC+5 (PST)
- Postal code: 75300

Water Pump (Urdu: واٹر پمپ) is a residential neighborhood in the Karachi Central district of Karachi, Pakistan.

It is near the main water pump that supplies fresh water to the city of Karachi.

== Demography ==
Ethnic groups in Water Pump include Sindhis, Kashmiris, Seraikis, Pakhtuns, Balochis, Memons, Bohras and Ismailis.

== See also ==
- Karachi Central District
