= Aisha Manzil =

Neighbourhood in Karachi, Pakistan

Aisha Manzil عائشہ منزل
- Neighbourhood
- Country: Pakistan
- District: Karachi Central
- City: Karachi
- Time zone: UTC+5 (PST)
- Postal code: 75300

Aisha Manzil or Ayesha Manzil (Urdu: عائشہ منزل) is a neighbourhood in the Central Karachi District of Karachi, Pakistan. Aisha Manzil in one of the localities where many ethnic Bengalis live.

The places in Aisha Manzil include Dhamthal Sweets, the Aisha Manzil Flyover and Agha Khan Nursing Home. A cinema (cinepax) situated near Aisha Manzil close to the old Arshi Cinema is no longer operative and has now become a shopping mall. Aisha Manzil is a landmark of Gulberg Subdivision.
