= Ancholi =

Coordinates: 24.9454°N 67.0771°E

Ancholi انچولی
- Neighbourhood
- Interactive map of Ancholi انچولی
- Country: Pakistan
- City: Karachi
- District: Karachi Central
- Time zone: UTC+5 (PST)
- Postal code: 75300

Ancholi (Urdu: انچولی) is a neighbourhood in the Karachi Central district of Karachi, Pakistan.

== See also ==
- Gulberg Town
- Sadat Colony, Ancholi
- Gulistan-e-Jauhar
- Gulshan-e-Iqbal
