= Karimabad, Karachi =

Residential neighbourhood of Karach, Pakistan

Karimabad كريم آباد
- Neighbourhood
- Country: Pakistan
- City: Karachi
- District: Karachi Central
- Time zone: UTC+5 (PST)
- Postal code: 75300

Karimabad (Urdu: كريم آباد) is a residential neighbourhood in the Karachi Central district of Karachi, Pakistan.

== Karimabad underpass project ==
The construction of the Karimabad underpass in Karachi has faced significant delays and cost overruns, with its budget escalating from an initial Rs. 1.35 billion to nearly Rs. 4 billion. The project's slow progress is attributed to the discovery of a main water line during excavation, which required deeper digging, as well as delays in the release of funds from the provincial government. A lack of proper initial planning and management has also been cited as a key factor contributing to the issues.

== See also ==
- Moosa Colony
