= Moosa Colony =

Residential neighbourhood in Karachi, Pakistan

Coordinates: 24°55′N 67°03′E

Moosa Colony (Urdu: موسى کالونى}) (Bengali: মূসা কলোনি) is one of the neighbourhoods of Gulberg Town in Karachi, Sindh, Pakistan.

== Fish market ==
A prominent fish market is located in Moosa Colony.

== Demography ==
The residents of Moosa Colony include Bengalis, Muhajirs, Punjabis, Rohingyas and Pashtuns.

== Encroached land ==
Many of the houses of the neighbourhood are built on encroached land, and anti-encroachment drives have been carried out by the authorities.
