= Shafiq Mill Colony =

Shafiq Mill Colony شفیق مل کالونی
- Neighbourhood
- Country: Pakistan
- City: Karachi
- District: Karachi Central
- Time zone: UTC+5 (PST)
- Postal code: 75300

Shafiq Mill Colony (Urdu: شفیق مل کالونی) is a neighbourhood in the Karachi Central district of Karachi, Pakistan.

There are several ethnic groups in Shafiq Mill Colony including Muhajirs, Sindhis, Kashmiris, Seraikis, Pakhtuns, Balochis, Memons, Bohras, Ismailis, etc.
