= Azizabad, Karachi =

Coordinates: 24°55′N 67°04′E

Azizabad عزيز آباد
- Neighbourhood
- Interactive map of Azizabad
- Country: Pakistan
- Province: Sindh
- City: Karachi
- District: Karachi Central
- Time zone: UTC+5 (PST)
- Postal code: 75950

Azizabad (Urdu: عزيز آباد) is a neighborhood in the Karachi Central District of Karachi, Pakistan.

== See also ==
- Karachi Central District
