= Dieppe maps =

Series of 16th-century world maps made in Dieppe, Seine-Maritime

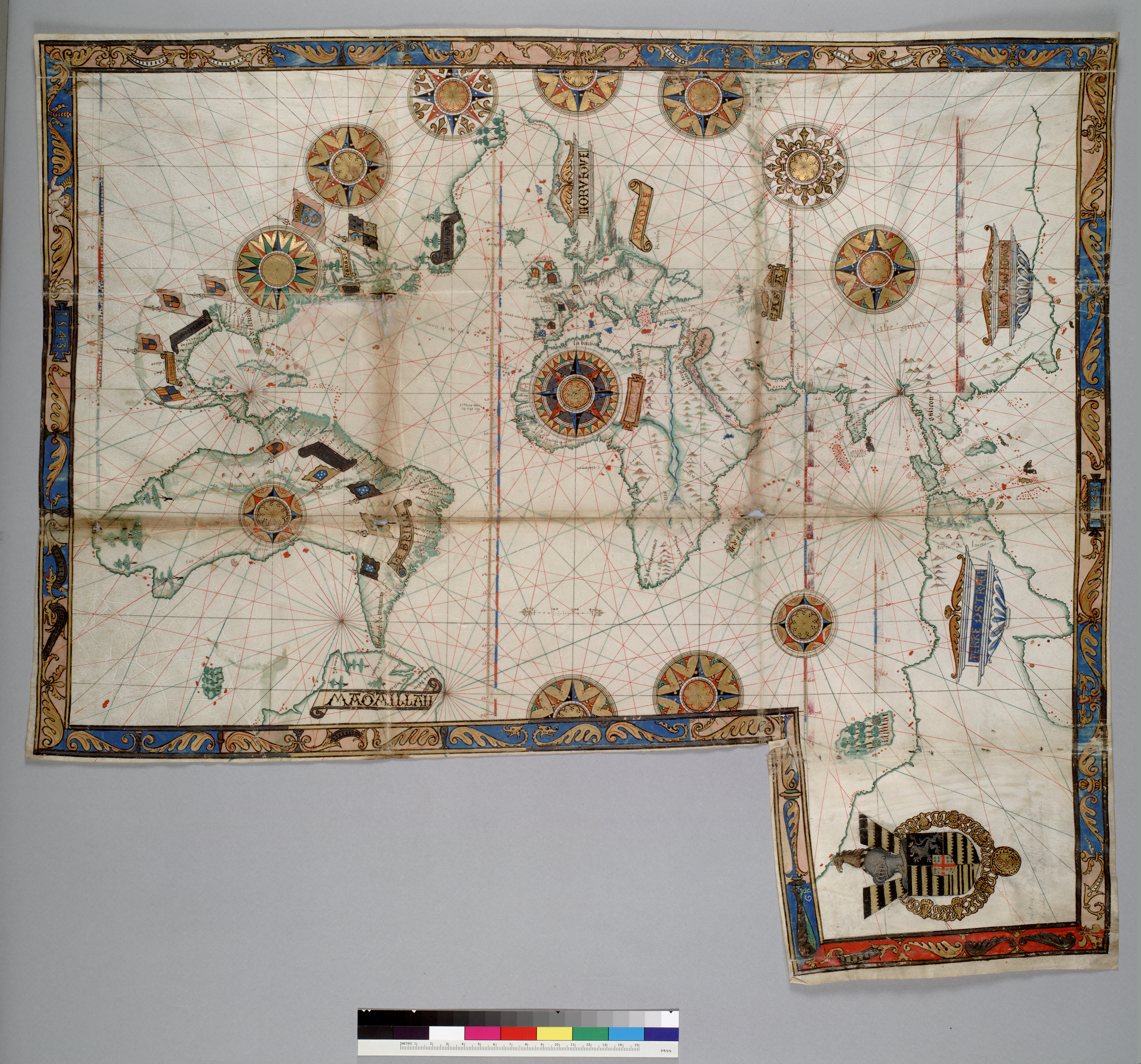
A world map by Guillaume Brouscon, an example of a Dieppe map, 1543.

The Dieppe maps are a series of world maps and atlases produced in Dieppe, France, in the 1540s, 1550s, and 1560s. They are large hand-produced works, commissioned for wealthy and royal patrons, including Kings Henry II of France and Henry VIII of England. The Dieppe school of cartographers included Pierre Desceliers, Jean Rotz, Guillaume Le Testu, Guillaume Brouscon and Nicolas Desliens.

== Existing Dieppe maps ==
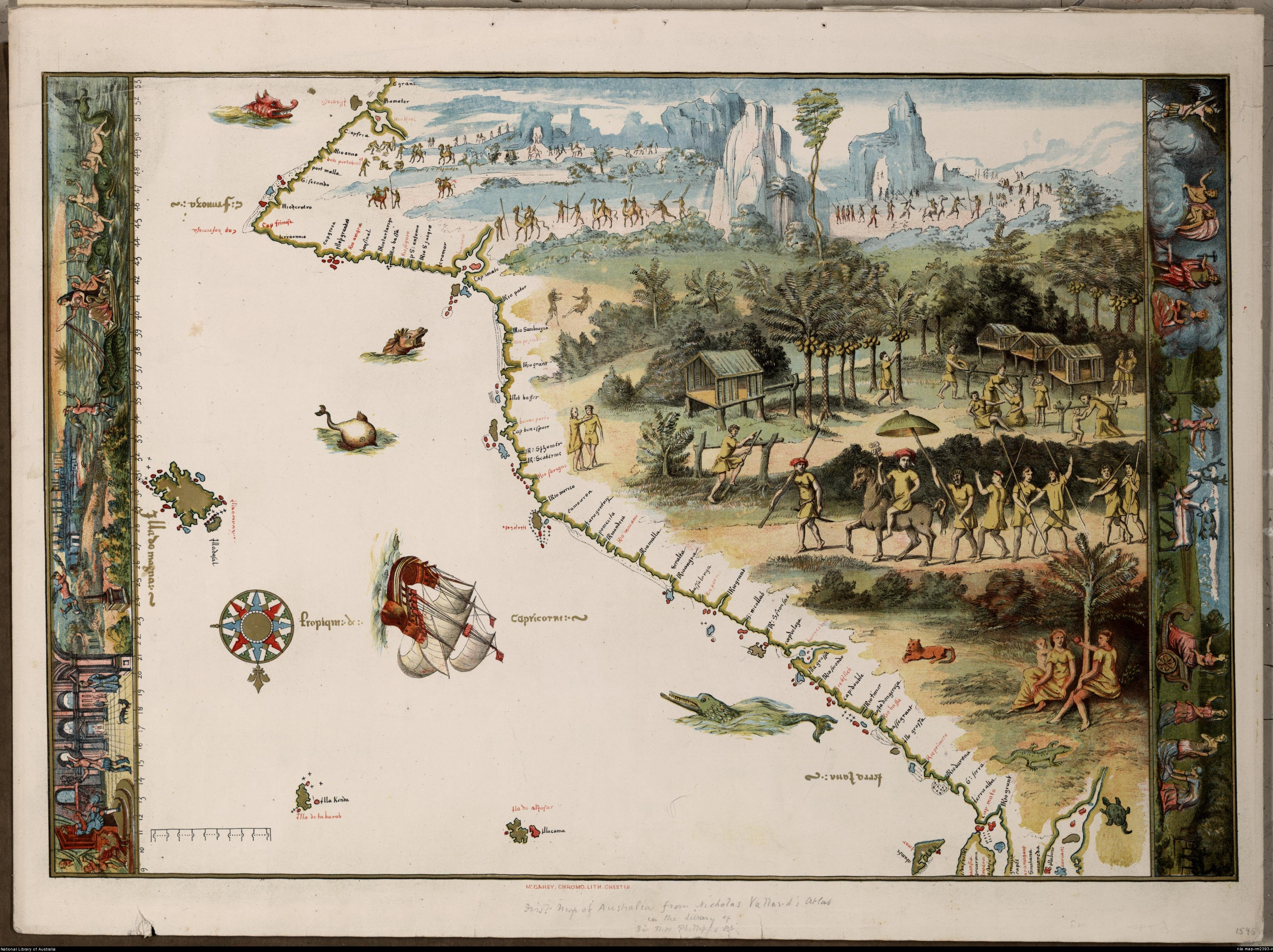
Jave La Grande's east coast: from Nicholas Vallard's atlas, 1547. This is part of an 1856 copy of one of the Dieppe maps. Copy held by the National Library of Australia.

The Dieppe maps known to have existed into modern times include the following:

- Jean Mallard, Map of the World c.1540, British Library, London
- Jean Rotz, Boke of Idrography, 1542. British Library, London
- Guillaume Brouscon, world chart, 1543, Huntington Library, Los Angeles, California
- Pierre Desceliers, "Royal" world chart, 1546. John Rylands Library, University of Manchester
- Anonymous, "Harleian" or "Dauphin" world chart. c1547. British Library, London
- Anonymous, made for Nicholas Vallard, portolan atlas, c. 1547. Huntington Library, Los Angeles, California
- Pierre Desceliers, world chart, 1550. British Library, London
- Pierre Desceliers, world chart, 1553. Vienna (Destroyed)
- Guillaume Le Testu, Cosmographie Universelle, 1555. Bibliothèque du Service historique de l'Armée de Terre, Paris
- the manuscript 'Livre de la Marine' of the so-called Pilote Pasterot, an atlas preserved in the British Library (Egerton MS 1513).
- Anonymous, portolan atlas – attributed to Pierre Desceliers, world chart. c1555. Morgan Library, New York City
- Guillaume Le Testu, world chart, 1566. Bibliothèque Nationale de France, Paris
- Nicolas Desliens, world chart, c. 1541-1561. Saxon State Library, Dresden
- Nicolas Desliens, world chart, 1566.
- Nicolas Desliens, world chart, 1567. National Maritime Museum, Greenwich.
- Attributed to Nicholas Desliens, world chart, c. 1568. National Maritime Museum, Greenwich.
- Jean Cossin, Carte cosmographique ou Universelle description du monde, 1570. Bibliothèque Nationale de France, Paris
- Jacques de Vaulx (Jacques de Vau de Claye), Les premieres Oeuvres de Jacques de Vaulx, Le Havre, 1584, f.26v, La Figure de l'autre moitie du globe terrestre avant le Pole antarticqe, Bibliothèque nationale de France.

Sarah Toulouse has published a more detailed and comprehensive list of 37 charts and atlases made between 1542 and 1635 and belonging to the Dieppe or Norman school of marine cartography.

== The Dieppe school of mapmaking ==
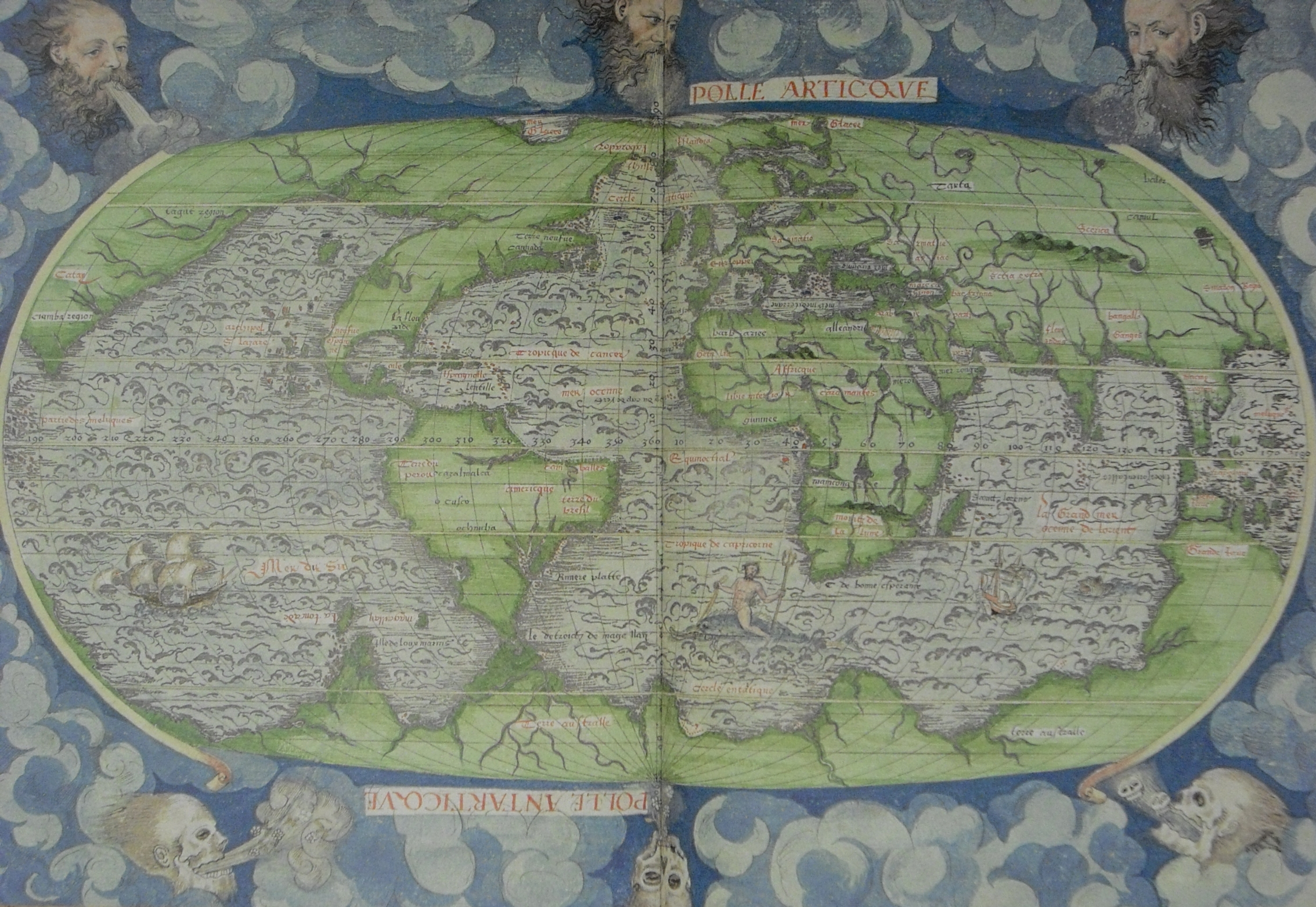
Guillaume Le Testu's 1556 Cosmographie Universel, 4ème projection, where the northward extending promontory of the Terre australe is called Grande Jave.

Because many of the inscriptions on the Dieppe maps are written in French, Portuguese or Gallicised Portuguese, it has often been assumed that the Dieppe school of mapmakers were working from Portuguese sources that no longer exist. It has been assumed that Portuguese cartographers were bribed for information of the latest discoveries, despite the official Portuguese ‘Politica de sigilo’ (‘policy of silence’). The Cantino map of 1502 (not a Dieppe school map) shows evidence of second-hand Portuguese sources, and this has been taken by some as supporting evidence for this assumption.

Common features of most of the Dieppe world maps (see Vallard 1547, Desceliers 1550) are the compass roses and navigational rhumb lines, suggestive of a sea-chart. However, the maps are best understood as works of art, clearly intended to be spread out on a table, and containing information on the latest discoveries, side by side with mythological references and illustrations. For example, the Desceliers 1550 map carries descriptions of early French attempts to colonise Canada, the conquests of Peru by the Spanish and the Portuguese sea-trade among the Spice Islands. On the same map can be found descriptions of legendary Cathay, king Prester John in Ethiopia, and the race of Amazons in Russia. Other Dieppe maps also carry fictitious features such as the Marco Polo inspired Zanzibar/Îles des Geanz. (see Vallard 1547, Rotz 1542 and Dauphin c. 1536–42). As with other maps made before the 17th century, the Dieppe maps show no knowledge of longitude. While latitude could be marked in degrees as observed by astrolabe or quadrant, easting could only be given in distance. Mercator's projection first appeared in 1568–9, a development too late to influence the Dieppe cartographers.

Most of the Dieppe maps depict a large land mass entitled Jave la Grande or terre de lucac (Locach) between what is now Indonesia and Antarctica. In the English-speaking world particularly, academic and popular interest in the Dieppe maps over the last 150 years has focused largely on this feature of the maps. This is because Jave la Grande is thought by some writers to provide clues of a possible Portuguese exploration of Australia's coasts in the 1520s. However, the most recent academic writings on the Dieppe maps by Carile (1997), Brunelle (2007) and King (2009) have suggested that the maps need to be considered in their entirety, and consideration needs to be given to what they reveal about various influences on the mapmakers, as well as French aspirations.

This group of writers argue that the maps are not necessarily literal records of voyages of exploration. On the 1543 world chart of Guillaume Brouscon this feature, the northern part of TERRE OSTRALE (Terra Australis), is called terre de lucac (Locach); on this chart, la Jave grande refers to Java, and Jave refers to an island to its east (Bali, Lombok or Sumbawa). Similarly, on the 1570 Carte cosmographique ou Universelle description du monde of Jean Cossin, an originator of the sinusoidal projection, this feature is called Terre de lucac, as it is also by Jacques de Vaulx on his chart. On the so-called Pasterot atlas (British Library MS Egerton 1513) it is called IOCAT, another form of Locach.

It is noteworthy that the Unfortunate Isles (Islas Infortunadas) discovered during Magellan's voyage across the Pacific in 1522 appear on the Dieppe maps, renamed with a corrupted version of his name as ysles de magna and ye de saill or some slight variation thereof, and displaced to the vicinity of Jave la Grande / Lucach.

== As evidence of French territorial aspirations ==
=== Gayle K. Brunelle's work ===
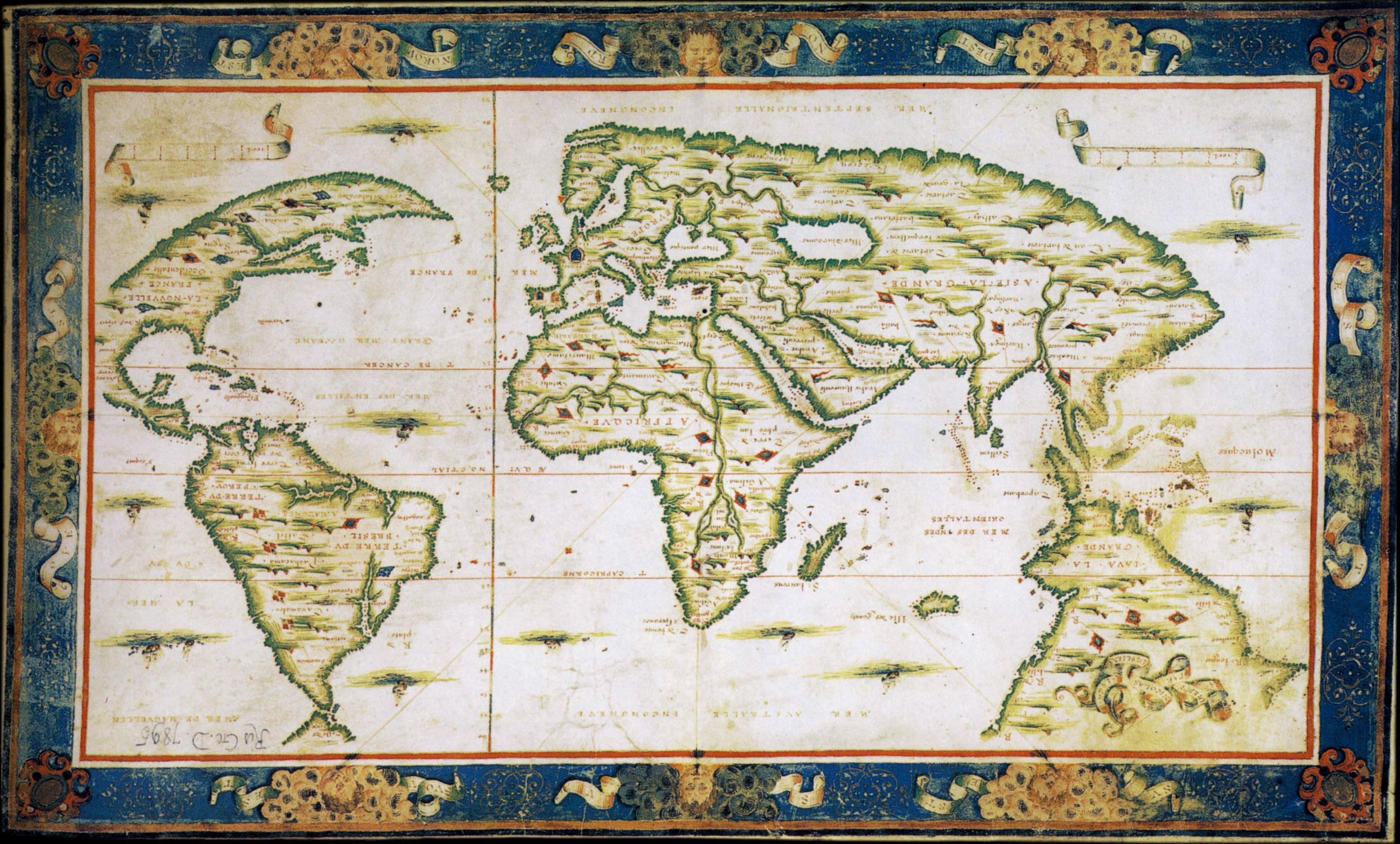
World map of Nicolas Desliens, 1566.

Professor Gayle K. Brunelle of California State University has argued that, although the Dieppe school of cartographers was active for only a generation – from about 1535 to 1562 – the cartographers associated with it were acting as propagandists for French geographic knowledge and territorial claims in the New World. The decades when the Dieppe school was flourishing were also the decades in which French trade with the New World was at its 16th-century height, in terms of the North Atlantic fish trade, the still fledgling fur trade, and, most important for the cartographers, the rivalry with the Portuguese for control of the coasts of Brazil and the supplies of lucrative Brazilwood. Brunelle states that the Dieppe cartographers accessed cartographic skills and geographic knowledge from Portuguese mariners, pilots, and geographers working in France, at the same time as they were producing maps meant to emphasize French dominion over the New World, both in Newfoundland and in Brazil, that the Portuguese also claimed. Portuguese-style maps, in particular, became the basis for the work of other cartographers produced for courts throughout Europe, so much so that at times Italian, French, German, or Flemish map makers did not even bother to translate the Portuguese inscriptions they had 'borrowed' from Portuguese maps. Brunelle noted that, in design and decorative style the Dieppe school maps represented a blending of the latest geographical and nautical knowledge circulating in Europe (and the portolan style of depicting coastlines), with older conceptualizations of world geography deriving from Ptolemy and mediaeval cartographers and explorers such as Marco Polo. Renaissance mapmakers such as those based in Dieppe relied heavily on each other's work, as well as on maps from previous generations, and thus their maps represented a mixture of old and new data and even differing conceptualizations of space, often coexisting uneasily in the same map.

=== Other writers ===
The Dieppe maps all depict the hypothetical southern continent, Terra Australis, incorporating a huge promontory extending northward called "Jave la Grande". According to the French geographer Numa Broc, Terra Australis found its most inspired illustrator in the pilot-cartographer of Le Havre, Guillaume Le Testu. Le Testu's Cosmographie Universelle, the sumptuous atlas he presented in 1556 to Gaspard II de Coligny, Grand Admiral of France, constituted a veritable encyclopaedia of the geographic and ethnographic knowledge of the time. French historian Frank Lestringant has said: "The nautical fiction of Le Testu fulfilled the conditions of a technical instrumentality, while giving to King Henry II and his minister, Admiral Coligny, the… anticipatory image of an empire that awaited to be brought into being". In the Cosmographie twelve vividly coloured charts are devoted to a survey of the fictitious continent Terra Australis. In these charts, Le Testu drew the outlines of an enormous Austral continent which covered the southern part of the globe and filled a considerable part of the Indian Ocean. This imaginary land derived from the Antichthone of the Greeks and had already been reactivated, notably by the mathematician and cosmographer Oronce Fine (1531) and by Le Testu's predecessors of the Dieppe school. According to the Portuguese historian Paolo Carile, the attitude of Le Testu reveals a cultural conflict between the old cosmographic beliefs and the demands of an empirical concept of geographical and ethnographical knowledge, influenced by the rigour of his Calvinist faith. Carile notes that while on the iconographic side Le Testu depicts an Austral Continent with strangely tropical conditions incorporating beasts drawn from fantasy and old legends, on the other side he nullifies these leaps of imagination by his admission that the land shown as part of the Terra Australis was still unknown and what was marked out on his map was based solely on imagination and surmise.

=== Cosmography of Oronce Fine and Johannes Schoener ===
The cartographers of the Dieppe school incorporated into their world maps the cosmographic concepts of Oronce Fine, the first Professor of Mathematics at the Collège Royal in Paris (now the Collège de France). His 1531 world map was published in 1532 in the Novus Orbis Regionum ac Insularum. Fine's cosmography was derived from that of the German mathematician, Johannes Schöner. In his study of Schöner's globes, Franz von Wieser, found that the derivation of Fine's mappemonde from them was "unverkennbar" ("unmistakeable"). Lucien Gallois noted in 1890, as Franz von Wieser had done before him, the undeniable "ressemblance parfaite" ("perfect resemblance") between Fine's 1531 mappemonde and Schöner's 1533 globe. Schöner's globe of 1523 also closely resembled Fine's mappemonde, proving that Schöner's cosmographic concepts pre-dated those of Finé. Albert Anthiaume wrote in 1911:

Whence had the Norman cartographers drawn the idea of this continent [la Terre Australe]? From the bicordiform mappemonde of Oronce Finé (1531), which he in turn had borrowed, according to Gallois, from Schoener....Most of the Norman cartographers, and particularly Le Testu, knew the works of Oronce Finé.

One place name in particular on the Dieppe maps, the baie bresille on northwest coast the 1542 Rotz map's Lande of Java, which appears as Baye bresille on the Harleian, Baye bresill on the Desceliers and Baie Braecillie on Le Testu's Grande Jave of 1556, illustrates the reliance of their makers on the Schöner/Finé cosmography. Armand Rainaud noted in 1893 that this appellation, "without doubt comes from the globes of Schoener and the maps of Oronce Fine". On Finé's 1531 mappemonde, BRASIELIE REGIO is shown as part of the Terra Australis lying to the east of Africa and to the south of Java, just where Schöner located BRASIELIE REGIO on his 1523 globe, and where the Dieppe maps locate their Baye Bresille.

Another indication of this reliance is given by the placement of CATIGARA (Kattigara) on the western coast of South America on the mid-1540s Harleian mappemonde and on Le Testu's 1556 map of western South America: the same location it occupied on Fine's 1531 mappemonde and on Schöner's 1523 and 1533 globes. Kattigara or Cattigara was understood by the 2nd-century Alexandrian geographer Ptolemy to be a port and emporium on the eastern side of the Sinus Magnus ("Great Gulf"), the actual Gulf of Thailand. The 1507 Waldseemüller map shows Catigara in this location. Following the 1519–1521 circumnavigation of the world by the expedition led by Ferdinand Magellan and completed after his death in the Philippines by Sebastian de Juan Sebastián Elcano, Schöner identified the Pacific Ocean with Ptolemy's Sinus Magnus, which he labelled on his 1523 globe, SINUS MAGNUS EOV[um] MARE DE SUR (the Great Gulf, Eastern Sea, South Sea"). The eastern side of the Sinus Magnus, which Schöner took to be the peninsula of India Superior (Indochina) where Cattigara was located, was therefore identified by him with South America, which on his 1533 globe bears the inscription, America, Indiae superioris et Asiae continentis pars ("America, a part of India Superior and of the Asian continent"). Cattigara was accordingly located on Schöner's 1523 and 1533 globes on the western coast of South America. CATIGARA occupied the same location on Fine's mappemonde, as it also did on the Dieppe school maps, the mid-1540s Harleian mappemonde and Le Testu's 1556 map of western South America.

=== La Popelinière and French colonial expansion ===
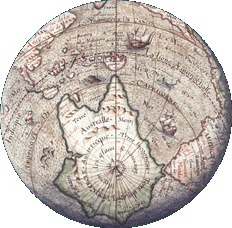
Globe by Jacques de Vau de Claye (1583) showing "Terre de Beac/Locac" as a peninsula of the "Terre Australle".

The extent of French knowledge concerning Terra Australis in the mid-16th century is indicated by Lancelot Voisin de La Popelinière, who in 1582 published Les Trois Mondes, a work setting out the history of the discovery of the globe. In Les Trois Mondes, La Popelinière pursued a geopolitical design by using cosmographic conjectures which were at the time quite credible, to theorize a colonial expansion by France into the Austral territories. His country, eliminated from colonial competition in the New World after a series of checks at the hands of the Portuguese and Spanish, could only thenceforward orient her expansion toward this "third world". He declared: "to the ambition of the French is promised the Terre Australe, a territory which could not but be filled with all kinds of goods and things of excellence". Taking up an earlier proposal by André d'Albaigne and inspired by Le Testu's description of Terra Australis, La Popelinière described in eloquent terms this unknown "third world" which would complete the Old World and the New World. He wrote;

"it is a land extending towards the South, or Midi, to thirty degrees from the Equator, of much greater extent than the whole of America, only discovered by Magellan when he passed through the strait that is the passage between the Austral land and the southern quarter of America to go to the Moluccas... We know nothing of so fine, so great a country, which can have no less of wealth nor other properties than the Old and New Worlds".

It is noteworthy that La Popelinière believed that only Ferdinand Magellan had actually sighted the southern continent, in the shape of Tierra del Fuego. He was apparently ignorant that Francis Drake sailed through open sea to the south of Tierra del Fuego in 1578, proving it to be an island and not, as Magellan had supposed, part of Terra Australis. La Popelinière, the would be colonist, gave no indication that he thought that anyone, French, Portuguese or otherwise, had visited the part of Terra Australis shown on the Dieppe maps as "Jave la Grande".

== Debates over the theory of Portuguese discovery of Australia ==
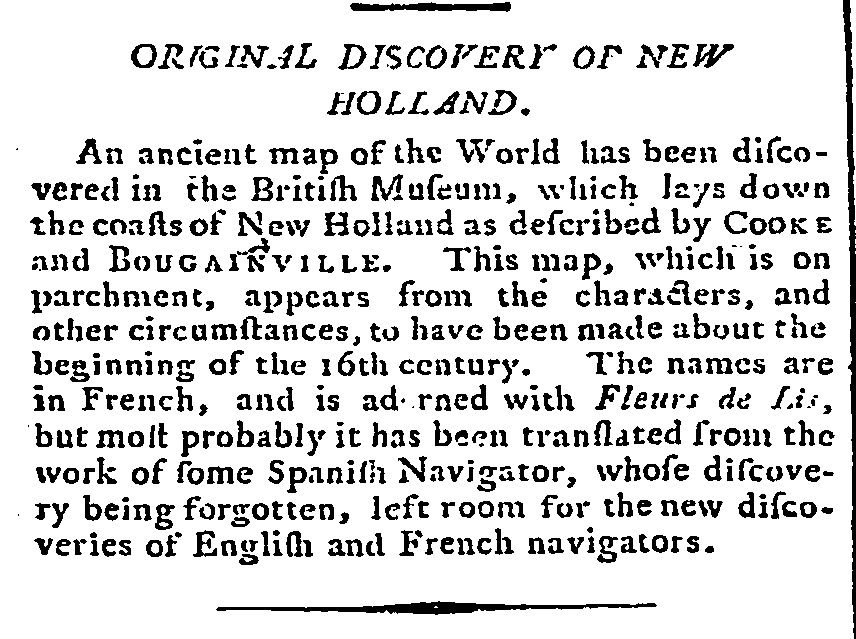
Newspaper article of 4 February 1790

Discussion of the Dieppe maps in contemporary Australia (except for the work of Robert J. King) is exclusively confined to the Jave la Grande feature. In the media, the maps are sometimes mistakenly described as Portuguese.

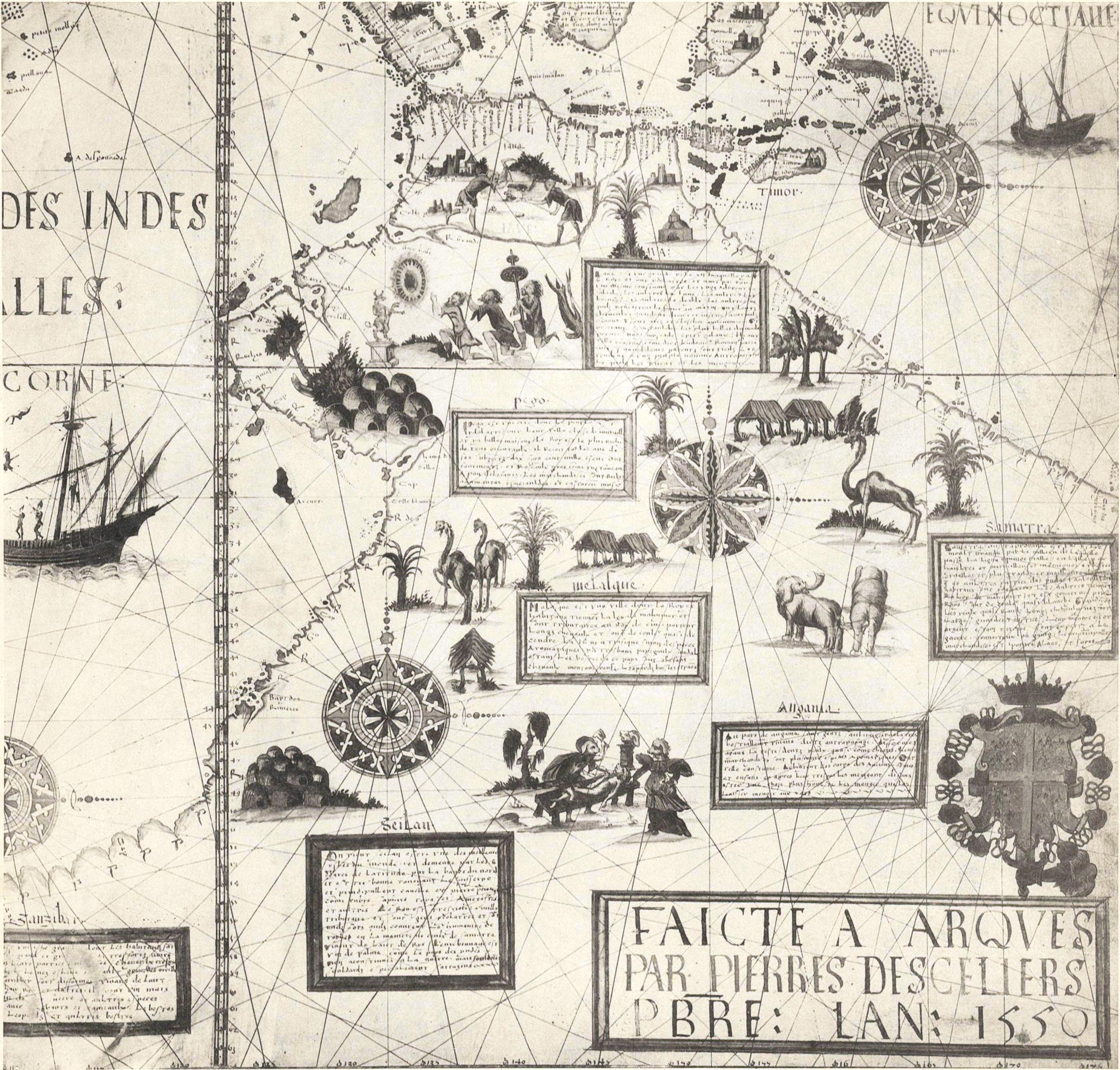
Map detail of Terre Australe by Desceliers, 1550

The first writer to put these maps forward as evidence of Portuguese discovery of Australia was Alexander Dalrymple in 1786, in a short note to his Memoir Concerning the Chagos and Adjacent Islands. Dalrymple was intrigued enough to publish 200 copies of the Dauphin map.

Since then a number of other writers have contributed to the debate about the "Jave La Grande" landmass that appears on the Dieppe maps. These include;

=== 19th and early 20th century writers ===
- French diplomat and geographer, Charles Etienne Coquebert de Montbret, having examined the Harleian world map and Rotz atlas at the British Museum in 1802, proposed in a lecture to the Société Philomathique de Paris in 1803 that its Lande of Java was evidence of a discovery of the east coast of Australia by Portuguese based in the Moluccas, who perhaps were accompanied by French seafarers, who thereby obtained the intelligence upon which the maps were prepared. His claim was rebutted by Frédéric Metz in a letter to the Revue Philosophique, Littéraire et Politique of 11 November 1805. Metz noted the absence of New Guinea and the Gulf of Carpentaria, and pointed out that a chart that recorded the voyage of navigators who had gone as far as the southern extremity of the east coast of Australia could not have failed to indicate the breadth of sea that separated Australia from Java, whereas the Rotz map showed only a narrow channel between the two.
- R. H. Major, in 1859, then Keeper of Maps in the British Museum, who wrote Early Voyages to Terra Australis, arguing "Java La Grande" was Australia's west and east coastline.
- Of the Dieppe maps, the Rotz (1547), the Harleian or Dauphin (mid-1540s), and the Desceliers (1550) were published by the British Museum in 1885, and were described by Joseph Maiden in an 1886 article. He accepted that they showed Australia and were of Portuguese origin.
- James R. McClymont believed that "Jave la Grande" on the Dieppe maps was a theoretical construct and not the result of an actual discovery of Australia. In 1892, he drew attention to the similarity of the "Jave la Grande" of the Dieppe maps with the outline of the coasts of South America and noted the placement on it of American place names such as Baye bresill, and presented this as proof of "the complete absence of all 9connection between the theory of a Terra Australis and the geographical fact of the Australian continent". His lament was that, "to this day a confusion exists between these distinct phenomena, which blurs the outlines of early Australian history". McClymont cited the Franco-Portuguese navigator and cosmographer Jean Alfonse who, in his work of 1544, La Cosmographie, identified Java Minor (Sumatra) as an island but Java Major (Java) as part of the continent of Terra Australis, which extended as far as the Antarctic Pole and the Strait of Magellan. Based on a faulty reading of Marco Polo, Alfonse wrote in La Cosmographie: "La Grand Jave is a land that goes as far as under the Antarctic Pole and from the Terre Australle in the west to the land of the Strait of Magellan on the eastern side. Some say that it is islands but from what I have seen of it, it is a continent [terre ferme]... That which is called Jave Mynore is an island, but la Grand Jave is terra firma."
- George Collingridge wrote The Discovery of Australia in 1895 and reproduced a number of the "Jave La Grande" sections of several Dieppe maps for English speaking audiences. He also argued "Jave La Grande" was substantially Australia's coastline. Collingridge produced a shorter version of this book for use in New South Wales schools; The First Discovery of Australia and New Guinea in 1906. It was not used.
- Edward Heawood, Librarian of the Royal Geographical Society, London, noted in 1899 that the argument for the coasts of Australia having been reached early in the 16th century rested almost entirely on the fact that "early in the sixteenth century a certain unknown map-maker drew a large land, with indications of definite knowledge of its coasts, in the quarter of the globe in which Australia is placed". He pointed out that "a difficulty arises from the necessity of supposing at least two separate voyages of discovery, one on each coast, though absolutely no record of any such exists". He concluded: "the slight reliance to be placed on the French maps with respect to outlying parts of the world, and the influence still exercised by the old writers, is shown by their delineation of Japan, the insertion of an Isle des Géants in the Southern Indian oceans, and of Catigara on the west coast of South America, as also by the fictitious coast-line of a southern continent... This should surely make us hesitate to base so important assumption as that of a discovery of Australia in the 16th century on their unsupported testimony". Heawood subsequently said he thought there was an "extraordinarily slight foundation" for the idea of a discovery of Australia early in the 16th century, "considering the vagueness of the delineation of the southern land, and the fact that this is not limited to the position of Australia, but stretches completely round the southern hemisphere, in some (including the earliest) of the maps". That it came farthest north where Australia happened to be was merely due to the arbitrary junction with Java, of which the southern coast was then unknown, and which from Marco Polo's time had been thought to be of enormous extent. Heawood noted that the Pierre Desceliers mappemondes of 1536 and 1550 bore a picture of cannibals on Jave la Grande, which appeared to have been copied from a similar tableau on the island of Java on Martin Waldseemüller's 1516Carta Marina. Heawood concluded that this seemed to add strength to the argument for a hypothetical origin for Jave la Grande, Waldseemüller's representation of Java with its cannibals on the Carta Marina serving as the first stage in the process of its evolution".
- In 1902, the historian Charles de La Roncière argued for a French origin for Jave la Grande: "Besides spices and other valuable merchandise, the Parmentier expedition (of 1529) brought back vague ideas on Australia or Jave-la-Grande, which left traces in the contemporary Dieppe cartography".
- In an article in an 1874 issue of the Magazine of American History, historian Benjamin Franklin DeCosta discussed the Lenox Globe, which was probably manufactured in France in the early sixteenth century. De Costa drew attention to a large unnamed land mass depicted on it in the southern part of the eastern hemisphere and suggested that this land represented Australia. If so, he said, "it would be necessary to conclude that, although misplaced upon the Lenox Globe, Australia was known to the geographers of that early period." But in a subsequent study of the similar globe held by the Jagiellonian University in Crakow, Tadeusz Estreicher stated: "This land can only be America and we must assume that the island represents South America but certainly in the wrong place. This assumption becomes certainty when we find on the Jagellon globe that the island bears the inscription AMERICA NOVITER REPERTA [America newly discovered]". That is, the maker of the globe depicted South America twice on the globes, in opposite hemispheres, an indication of uncertainty as to its true location resulting from alternative measurements of longitude and of the size of the earth.
- Ida Lee suggested in 1904 that the first discovery of the Australian continent was due to Sebastian Cabot in 1499.
- The geographer Lucien Gallois concluded in 1912: “The great austral continent that appears on the French maps of the first part of the sixteenth century is obviously an appendage to the north coast of Java, thought of as the beginning of a land that extends far toward the south. The naming on the east and west coasts of this continent is absolute fantasy".
- Ernest Scott, first Professor of History at the University of Melbourne, wrote on the significance of Dieppe maps in several books between 1916 and 1929. He argued that while intriguing, the Dieppe maps alone could not be accepted as evidence the Portuguese had a knowledge of Australia in the 16th century. In the Introduction to Australian Discovery by Sea, Scott explained that the Dieppe mapmaker Desceliers had: "connected up Java with Ptolemy's imaginary outline of Terra Incognita, and also with the outline of the land which Magellan saw to the south of him when he sailed through his strait in 1520. But in so doing he played tricks with Ptolemy's frank confession of ignorance. He did not like the look of Ptolemy's plain line, so he serrated it. He actually attributed names to the teeth of the saw as if they were real capes, and showed rivers flowing into the gaps between. He produced a pretty and mysterious-looking map, which geographically was a hoax. There is no land where Desceliers marked those capes and streams. There is no continent stretching from Java to South America on the one side and to the south of Africa on the other. In joining up Java with Ptolemy's line he necessarily covered the area where the real continent of Australia was, and accidentally produced a certain delusive resemblance to part of the outline of that land. Desceliers' map does not prove that up to this date any navigator had seen any portion of Australia".
- G. Arnold Wood, Professor of History at the University of Sydney, gave several reasons in his authoritative Discovery of Australia (1922) for regarding with suspicion the claim advanced on behalf of the Dieppe maps. He said it seemed exceedingly unlikely that voyages took place during this period that would have enabled cosmographers to draw maps of the western, northern, and eastern coasts of Australia. There was no record, no hint, in contemporary narratives, of a single voyage of discovery on those coasts: "When I think of the enormous difficulties of navigation on these Australian coasts, of the scanty naval equipment of the handful of Portuguese, who, in 1512, had just arrived at the Moluccas, and of the lack of motive for voyages of detailed and scientific survey, I feel that nothing but evidence of the most unanswerable nature would induce me to accept those maps as representing the discovery of Australia." At that time it was the fashion to fill vacant spaces in the South with continents which were the result not of discoveries but of philosophical speculations. Java was an island that had for centuries enjoyed the reputation of being the largest and most magnificent island in the world, an island of from three thousand to seven thousand miles in circuit. To the south of Java, Marco Polo had been understood to say, was "an extensive and rich province that forms a part of the mainland." And Ludovico di Varthema had brought home stories of races of men who navigated by the Southern Cross, who lived in a country where the day did not last more than four hours, and where it was colder than in any other part of the world. Wood noted that Gerard Mercator interpreted these statements to find a place on the map for Marco Polo's "extensive and rich province" by adding to his Southern Continent a huge promontory stretching northwards towards Java. Mercator wrote upon it that anyone who had read certain chapters in Polo and Varthema would easily believe that very vast regions here existed. But to the Norman cartographers who were aware that the Portuguese had actually visited Java, it may have appeared that a better interpretation could be suggested. Polo and Varthema had not only spoken of a continent south of Java; they had also spoken of Java itself as Java Major, the greatest island in the world. Was it not likely that Java extended far southward? Was it not possible that, like Tierra del Fuego and perhaps New Guinea, it was a tip of the Austral continent with a centre in the South Pole? Wood proposed that the cosmographers might have supposed that immediately to the south of Java, separated only by a narrow channel, lay a great continent which, being virtually a part of Java, Marco Polo's Java Major, could be called Jave la Grande. Perhaps the "extensive and rich province that forms part of the mainland" was really continuous with Java Major, and might connect it with "the Austral Land not yet wholly discovered." Wood concluded: "on the whole, I am so impressed by the difficulty of explaining these maps as the product of voyages of discovery, and the easiness of explaining them as the product of the imagination working on scientific theories and Marco Polo narratives, that nothing would induce me to accept Jave la Grande as the equivalent of Australia save resemblances in detail of a very undeniable nature".
- Klaus Mehnert, professor of the history of the Pacific at the University of Hawaii, examined the cartographic history of the Pacific in 1944, including the maps of Rotz and Desceliers. With regard to the speculation that mapmakers of the early to mid-sixteenth century may have had some actual knowledge of Australia; whether, in other words, Australia was not discovered much earlier than had been generally assumed, he concluded that a closer examination revealed that in coast lines of these maps, including Mercator's of 1569 and that of Ortelius of 1570, "we do not find traces of Australia but only of the wrongly interpreted Marco Polo".

=== Contemporary writers ===
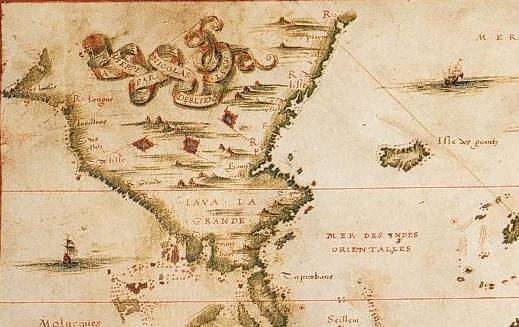
Nicolas Desliens, detail of "Java la Grande", 1566.

- In 1963, Professor Andrew Sharp suggested that the Dieppe cartographers had mistakenly reassembled original unscaled Portuguese charts of Java, resulting in "Jave La Grande". Sharp said that its western coast down to the last named place, Coste Bracq, was a reproduction of a mariner's chart of the coast of the south-western and western end of Java; from Coste Bracq southward was an arbitrary addition. The cartographer who compiled this composite map of the western coast had no idea of the relative scales of the originals, and influenced by his identification of Jave la Grande with Marco Polo's Java Major, showed the coast far too big in relation to the established cartography of Sumatra and the north coast of Java. As for the east coast, it was a reproduction of a mariner's chart of part of the southeast coast of Sumba, its eastern extremity and its northeast coast, all joined to Sumbawa. As on the western coast, the eastern coast of Jave la Grande was reproduced on a greatly exaggerated scale, again under the influence of Marco Polo's Java Major. The separation of Jave la Grande from Jave by the strait of R. Grande created a Java (Jave) corresponding to Marco Polo's Java Minor distinct from Jave la Grande. The imagined great land to the south was big enough to satisfy the description of Marco Polo's Java Major as the biggest island in the world and to become the nucleus for further extensions to the south with some flavour of the legendary Terra Australis about them.
- In 1977, lawyer Kenneth McIntyre wrote The Secret Discovery of Australia. Portuguese ventures 200 years before Captain Cook. This book achieved widespread publicity in Australia. It remains the best known of the books attempting to prove that Jave La Grande is Australia. McIntyre attributed discrepancies in "Java la Grande" to the difficulties of accurately recording positions without a reliable method of determining longitude, and the techniques used to convert maps to different projections.
- Robert Langdon concluded in a review of The Secret Discovery of Australia that he believed that Andrew Sharp satisfactorily explained the Dieppe maps in his book The Discovery of Australia: “They were simply clumsy attempts to piece together charts of various parts of Indonesia, plus some conjectured land to the south of it, which were drawn by different people at different times on completely different scales. The resemblances to Australia that can now be seen in them are purely coincidental.”
- Roger Hervé, map librarian at the Bibliothèque Nationale de France, Paris, argued the Dieppe maps were mainly based on the single voyage of Joäo Afonso in 1525-27, in the San Lesmes. Hervé claimed that Afonso was driven south from west of the Straits of Magellan, and that he was driven by very unusual winds west to the coast of New Zealand, then on to the coast of Australia, where the San Lesmes was wrecked (becoming the Warrnambool wreck known as the Mahogany Ship). Afonso and the crew then travelled by land or boat up the east coast to the latitude of Rockhampton, where he met up with the crew of the Portuguese, Gomes de Sequeira, who had been exploring the Moluccas. In Hervé's version, Cap de Fremose, which appears on many of the Dieppe maps as an easterly projection of the coast, is identified as New Zealand's East Cape.
- In the 1980s, Helen Wallis, then Curator of Maps at the British Library, suggested that the French 1529 voyage to Sumatra of Jean Parmentier and his brother may have collected information that found its way onto the Dieppe maps. While admitting the evidence for this was circumstantial, she suggested that perhaps a Dieppe cartographer such as Jean Rotz may have accompanied the expedition.
- In 1980, the French geographer Numa Broc commented on Wallis's suggestion: "Unfortunately, the accounts of sailors such as the Parmentier brothers or of Jean Alfonse are couched in much too imprecise terms for it to be possible to decide [whether they reached Australia]. Broc noted that the Dieppe cartographers replaced the Regio Patalis of Oronce Fine with a Grande Jave and a Petite Jave, more or less attached to an enormous austral land mass, and that their insistence on speaking of "la Grande Jave" permitted the erection of the hypothesis of a Portuguese or French "pre-discovery" of Australia between 1520 and 1530.
- In his exhaustive work on Luis Váez de Torres, Queensland historian Captain Brett Hilder suggested "Jave La Grande" as depicted on the Dieppe maps was simply a mythical continent.
- In 1984, Brigadier (ret'd) Lawrence Fitzgerald wrote Java La Grande (sic) In this book he compared the coastlines of "Jave la Grande" as shown on the Dauphin (1536–42) and Desceliers (1550) maps with the modern Australian coastline, arguing the Dieppe mapmakers had incorrectly assembled Portuguese charts. He also suggested some of the Dieppe map illustrations found on "Jave la Grande" may relate to Australia.
- In 1421: The Year China Discovered the World, published in 2002, the debunked pseudohistorian Gavin Menzies suggested the "Jave La Grande" landform of the Dieppe maps relates to discoveries of Chinese explorer Zheng He and his admirals. Menzies suggested the Dieppe mapmakers worked from Portuguese charts of Australia, which were in turn copied from Chinese sources.
- In his 2004 survey of mapping of the Pacific, Thomas Suarez suggests Jave La Grande is most likely a "whimsy sparked by medieval texts, which suggested a vast Java..." He also points out that some Dieppe chartmakers such as Pierre Desceliers on his 1546 world chart, "accompany it with an inscription stating that it has never been discovered."
- In 2007, journalist Peter Trickett's book Beyond Capricorn was published. This stated that an assembly error had been made by cartographers working on the Vallard Atlas of 1547, and that if part of it was rotated 90 degrees, it became an accurate map of the Australian coasts, and New Zealand's north island. He also suggested some of the illustrations and embellishments on "Jave La Grande" may relate to Australia. Some media publicity at the time of the book's release incorrectly suggested the Vallard map is not well known.
- Associate Professor William A. R. (Bill) Richardson was former reader in Portuguese and Spanish at Flinders University, South Australia. Since 1983 Richardson has written more than 20 articles on the "Jave La Grande" question for academic journals. Richardson has also criticized Gavin Menzies assertion the Dieppe maps provide clues as to a possible Chinese discovery of Australia. In 2007 he also criticized Trickett's book. In 2006 his book Was Australia charted before 1606? The Jave La Grande inscriptions was published. Richardson devotes much of this book to considering the "Jave La Grande" connection to Australia and in particular the information that toponymy (the study of placenames) can provide in identification. His conclusion is that "Jave La Grande" is unmistakably connected to the coast of south-west Java and the southern coast of Vietnam. A difficulty with the explanation put forward by Richardson is that, as he acknowledges, there is no surviving Portuguese chart that bears "an immediately obvious resemblance" to either the west coast of Jave la Grande south of R: Grande or to its east coast. He therefore suggests that the Portuguese charts that he says were the source for the Dieppe mapmakers "could well have been captured at sea" by French pirates or privateers, or possibly taken by "one of the renegade Portuguese who went to work abroad" to France, where they came into the hands of the Dieppe cartographers.
- Richardson's many writings have attracted academic support and criticism. Emeritus Professor Victor Prescott argued that Richardson "brilliantly demolished the argument that Java la Grande show(s) the east coast of Australia." However, Helen Wallis observed: "The place-name interpretations of Bill Richardson are ingenious, but the concept of Java-la-Grande as a composite of southern Java and Indochina is in my view far-fetched and not proven." Australian historian Alan Frost has also written that Richardson's argument is "so speculative and convoluted as not to be credible". The Portuguese historian Luis Filipe Thomaz has described Richardson's interpretation as "preposterous".
- In his 2010 book on maps, Australian writer Matthew Richardson devoted a chapter to challenging Professor Bill Richardson's thesis. He characterizes Richardson's theory that toponymy shows Jave la Grande to be a map of Java joined to Vietnam, as "far-fetched". Yet, he says, it has not been treated as such by the scholarly community, but has found "a warm reception among experienced researchers". He examines sceptically Bill Richardson's place name explanations one by one. On the explanation of Havre de Sylla on the west coast of Jave la Grande as being a corruption of "Cilacap" (Chilachap) on the south coast of Java, Richardson thinks Collingridge's explanation, that it matches Egtis Silla on Martin Behaim's globe, is more likely. He notes that "Syllacap", with a sibillant initial and a "c" is an improbable derivative from Chilachap. He concludes that not one place name on the west coast invites identification with the south of Java and that, if part of Java is represented, both scale and orientation are grossly in error. He notes that comparing Jave la Grande with any map of Vietnam, the disparity of scale may quickly be seen. South Vietnam could only have been mistaken for Jave la Grande by an early sixteenth century cartographer if there were no indications on the prototype chart of what in the world it represented. And no answer is given to how they chose a scale which gave it a similar length to Australia's east coast. On the east coast, he says of the explanation of Cap de fremose as a corruption of Cabo decamboja: "So all you have to do is read fr for dec, change a to e, delete the b, change j to s, change a to e, and add de. Both other letters stay the same. In six easy steps of this magnitude, you can derive any name you see from a name you would rather see". He concludes: "One has to ask how the Richardson analysis has gained the credence of experts, despite being easy to discredit".
- In a contribution to the University of Chicago's History of Cartography, Sarah Toulouse concluded regarding the Jave-la-Grande of the Norman charts: 'Our present knowledge of the available source material seems to support the idea that this large promontory was as fictional as the rest of Terra Australis. In fact, the Norman cartographers themselves refer to these regions as ones of "land not at all discovered," and in his Cartographie universelle Le Testu is even clearer on the matter when he says that he includes imaginary lands so as to alert navigators to the political dangers that might lie ahead in these unknown seas [folio 34]. Nevertheless, mystery remains—especially as some of the place-names on this imaginary coast are of Portuguese origin, but no known Portuguese map shows Jave-la-Grande as such'.
- Writing in the Journal of Northern Territory History in 2012, Pat Zalewski argues that the Dieppe maps are of the Northern Territory and Western Gulf of Carpentaria. He claims the origin for these maps were the Macassans, who were hunting turtle shell in the pre-trepang era, but fails to identify the path by which this information found its way on to the Dieppe maps.
- Chet van Duzer concluded in his study of Pierre Desceliers' world map of 1550 that the Jave la Grande on the Norman world maps of the sixteenth century did not represent a pre-discovery of Australia but was "merely an elaboration of the southern land mass as it appeared on Mercator's 1541 globe".
- Andrew Eliason has noted that the islands ylhas de magna and ye de saill that appear off the east coast of Jave la Grande on the Harleian mappemonde of c.1546, and on other Dieppe maps under similar names, appear as I. de Mague and I. de Sally on André Thevet's map, Quarte Partie du Monde (1575), where they represent two islands discovered by Magellan in 1520, ylhas de magna being a corruption of ysles de maguaillan (Magellan's isles).
- In a 2019 article in The Globe, Professor Brian Lees and Associate Professor Shawn Laffan from the University of New South Wales analysed the projections used on the 1542 Jean Rotz mappa mundi (world map). They come to the conclusion that the mappa mundi in Jean Rotz's atlas is a good "first approximation" of the Australian continent and also suggest that the "extension of the east coast may reflect early knowledge of New Zealand." They also say that whoever was responsible for knowledge of the Australian continent being carried back to Europe in the early part of the 16th Century, which led to the construction of Rotz's map, is unknown.
- In 2020, local historian Ray Blackwood argued the Dauphin Map shows Australia's coastline from Joseph Bonaparte Gulf in the west to the vicinity of Groote Eylandt in the east. He supports his argument by providing a list of "Identifiers" by which he equates named features in the maps with actual features on the Northern Territory coast. He asserts that the promontory "Simbana" on the north of Java la Grande equates with the Cobourg Peninsula with the Tiwi Islands to the west and Croker Island to the east. He puts forth the view that Cape Fremose is a contrivance of convenience by the cartographers of the time whereby they have lumped together the Wessel Islands and the complex of islands around Cape Arnhem because the tidal influences of the area made navigation among them too hazardous for boats of the time.
- At an international workshop at the Biblioteca Nacional, Lisbon, cartographic historian Robert King said that there was no evidence in Portuguese records and charts of the early 16th century that their navigators discovered Australia. He said that the large southern land, called Jave la Grande, or Terre de Lucac, on the world maps of the Dieppe school of marine cartography, which proponents of an early Portuguese discovery adduced in support, could be explained by setting those maps in the context of the development of cosmographic theory and its cartographic expression from Henricus Martellus to Gerard Mercator, 1491-1569. The southern continent of the Dieppe cartographers, like Mercator’s southern continent with its promontory of Beach (Locach), were the product not of actual discovery by French or Portuguese navigators but of imaginative extrapolation from a few mis-identified or misplaced coasts in the southern hemisphere. Following Magellan’s expedition of 1519-1522, mis-identification of Marco Polo's Java Minor (Sumatra) with the island of Madura allowed the southern coast of Java Major (Java) to remain undefined, despite the survivors of Magellan’s expedition having made their return voyage to Spain by the south of Java (Java Major) rather than through the strait between Madura and Java as was understood from Antonio Pigafetta's account of the voyage. This permitted cartographers to identify Java Major as a promontory of Terra Australis and with Marco Polo’s Locach. An adaptation of Oronce Fine’s map of 1531 formed the basis of the world maps of Gerardus Mercator and the Dieppe cartographers. With them, the Regio Patalis, shown as a promontory of the Terra Australis on Fine’s map, was identified with Marco Polo's Java Major, or Locach (also known as Beach). The ysles de magna and ye. de saill, shown off the east coast of Jave la Grande on the Harleian map, which appear as I. de Mague and I. de Sally on André Thevet’s Quarte Partie du Monde, represent the two islands discovered by Magellan during his voyage across the Pacific in 1522, which he called the Desventuradas, or Islas Infortunatos (Unfortunate Isles).The Jave la Grande and Terre de Lucac of the Dieppe maps represented Marco Polo's Java Major and Locach, displaced by the map-makers who misconstrued the information on Southeast Asia and America brought back by Portuguese and Spanish navigators.
- In 1603, a terrestrial globe was produced in Lyon by Guillaume Nicolai Belga: It depicted the southern continent and was the latest in a series of globes and world maps originating with Oronce Fine’s 1531 planisphere and Johannes Schoener’s 1523 globe and included Caspar Vopell’s globe of 1536, the world maps produced by the Norman cartographers of the Dieppe school, the globe made by Jean Naze of Lyon in 1560 and on Joannes Oterschaden’s globe of 1600. The view of the southern continent presented by Nicolai was formed at the beginning of the sixteenth century and had remained unchanged over eight decades because no European had reached the Southland before the globe was made in 1603, just three years before Dutch navigators began to reveal it in 1606.

== See also ==
- France-Asia relations
- France Antarctique
- Regio Patalis
- André d'Albaigne
- Jean Alfonse

== Sources ==
- McIntyre, K.G. (1977). The Secret Discovery of Australia, Portuguese ventures 200 years before Cook. Menindie: Souvenir Press. ISBN 0-285-62303-6.
- Richardson, W.A.R. (2006). Was Australia charted before 1606? The Jave La Grande inscriptions. Canberra: National Library of Australia. ISBN 0-642-27642-0.
