= Guillaume Brouscon =

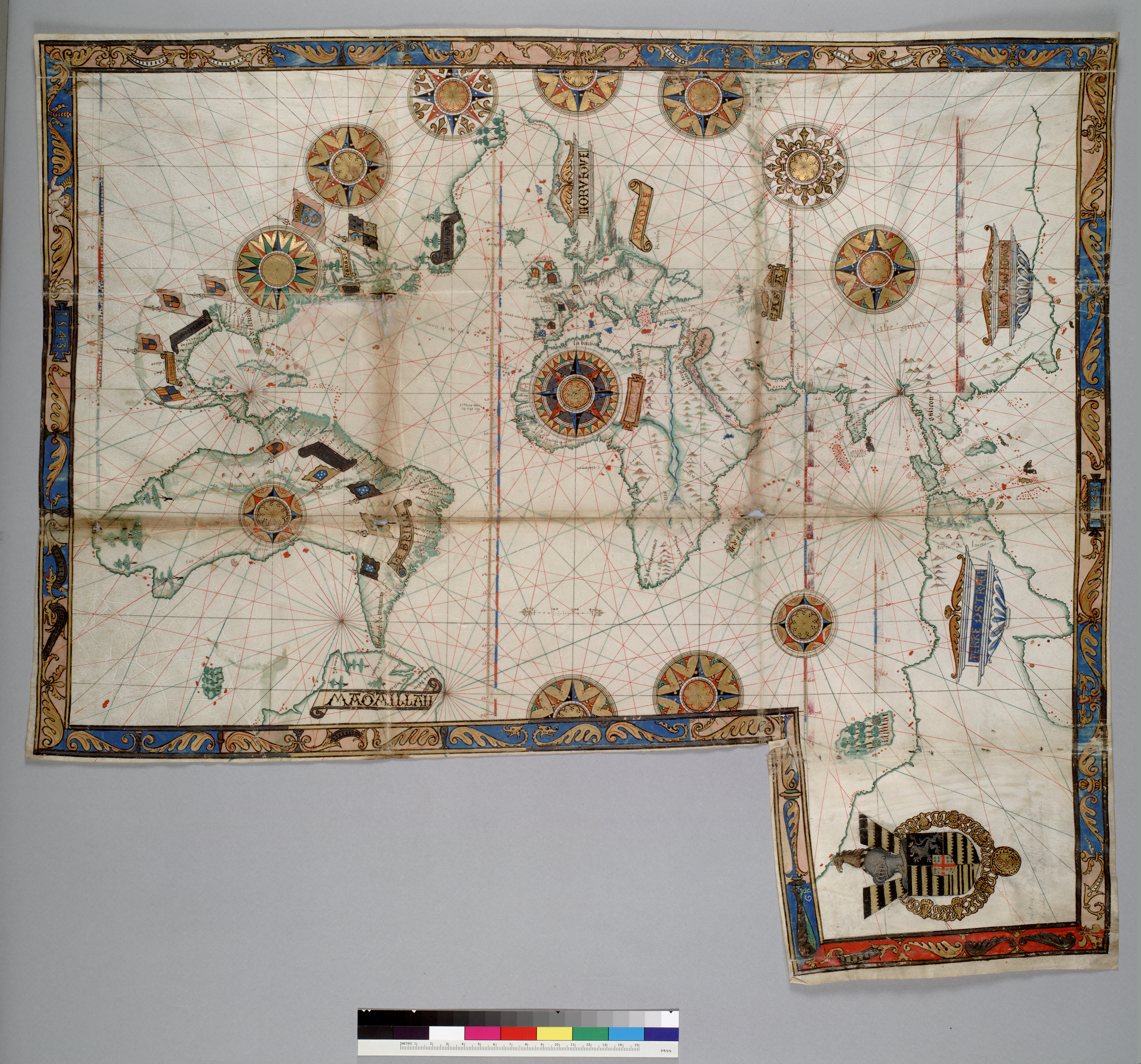
A world map by Guillaume Brouscon, an example of a Dieppe map, 1543.

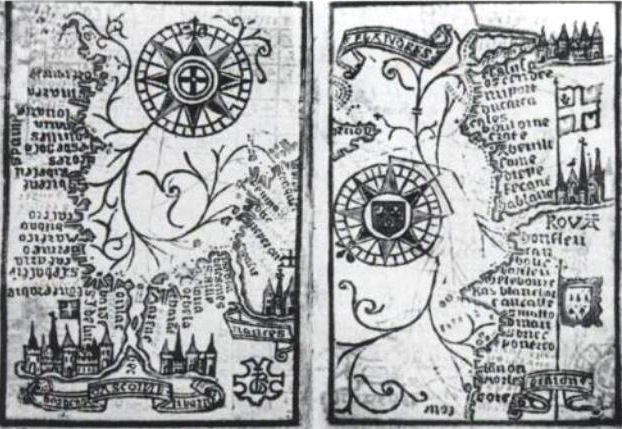
Brouscon's Almanach of 1546: Compass bearing of high waters in the Bay of Biscay (left) and the coast from Brittany to Dover (right).

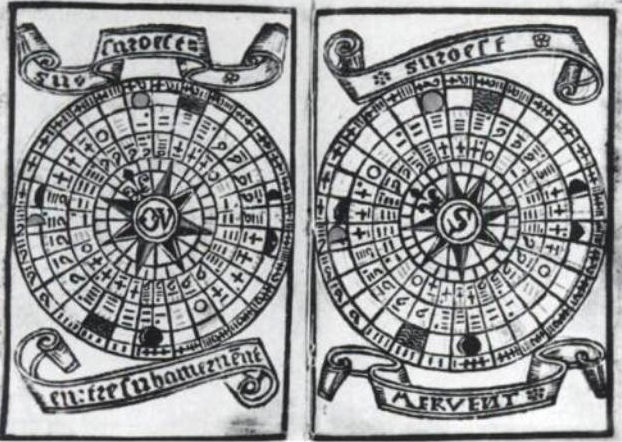
Brouscon's Almanach of 1546: Tidal diagrams "according to the age of the Moon".

Guillaume Brouscon was a Breton cartographer of the Dieppe school in the 16th century. He was from the port of Le Conquet, near Brest, which is shown prominently in large red lettering on his 1543 map of the world.

On his 1543 map of the world, the northern part of the promontory of the TERRE OSTRALE (Australe) is called terre de Lucac (the Land of Locach), and is separated from La Iave grande and Iave by the R. grande. That is, Brouscon, like Mercator, identified Fine's Regio Patalis not with Java Major but with Locach.

He published his Brouscon's Almanachs in 1546, which were used for their information on tides by English, French and Breton sailors. They allowed to known the direction of tidal currents, and to calculate tide level depending on the phase of the moon.
