= Jean Rotz =

French artist-cartographer

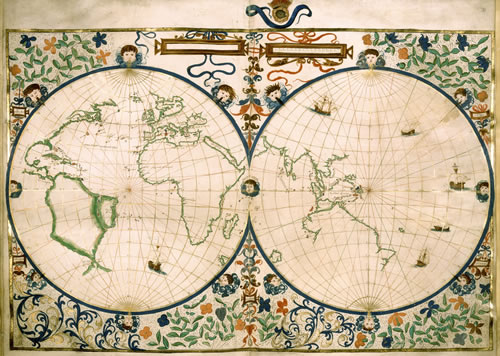
World map of Jean Rotz, 1542.

Jean Rotz, also called Johne Rotz, was a 16th-century French artist-cartographer. He was born to a Scottish father and a French mother.

== Career ==
Rotz was a member of the school of the Dieppe maps. He may have accompanied Jean Parmentier to Sumatra in 1529, and he definitely went to Brazil in 1539. His work was greatly influenced by these early French explorations, which induced him to create highly decorative maps.

Failing to find employment with King Francois I, Rotz went to England in 1542 and entered the service of Henry VIII. He presented Henry with his manuscript atlas, the Boke of Idrography, which contained a two-hemisphere world map. This map showed the distraits of magallane (Strait of Magellan), the two Unfortunate Islands (Insulas desfortunadas), unnamed on the map, discovered during Ferdinand Magellan's voyage across the Pacific, and the strait between Lytel Java (Java Minor) and the Londe of Java (Java Major) through which the Victoria, the last surviving ship of Magellan's expedition, was thought to have passed on the return voyage to Spain.

== Betrayal of King Henry VIII and England ==
In 1542, Jean Rotz was hired by King Henry VIII, alongside some other Frenchmen to become privateers which led to the betrayal for King Henry VIII's policy at sea for religious differences. Rotz would eventually betrayed the King and England after King Henry VIII granted his family rights to own land, including his wife Coleta and his children. It is said that King Henry VIII trusted Rotz, but it was believed that Henry VIII bribed loyalty. Jean Rotz was hired by King Henry VIII, alongside some other Frenchmen to become privateers which led to the betrayal for King Henry VIII's policy at sea for religious differences. Around the same year, King Henry VIII was ordering a fleet of ships to conquer enemy territories that gained the attention of the French army. The French was more concerned about Rotz as stated in a letter to the Admiral:

"A Dieppois named Jean Roze, now in the service of the King of England, who gives him 160 crowns a year, "a very good-natured man, and very well versed in matters by the navy and navigation," asked Selve to write to the king, to be able to return to France with his wife and children, offering to pay "the money and finances which have accustomed to be paid for such provisions." Selve notified the Admiral about this, pointing out that it would be useful to secure the services of this personage, who seems very experienced, or at least to deprive the King of England of him."

The reason why King Henry VIII was so faithful to foreign adversaries rather than his own adversaries was because Henry VIII was clever enough to attract the attention of French and their loyalty.

The Italian traveler Ludovico di Varthema visited Java in 1506 and said it “prope in inmensum patet (extends almost beyond measure)”. Rotz apparently identified this “Java patalis” with the Regio Patalis, a huge promontory of the Terra Australis, depicted on the 1531 world map of the royal cosmographer, Oronce Fine.

In the early nineteenth century, the resemblance of his Londe of Java to Australia was noted. Charles Ernest Coquebert de Montbret, having been able to examine the Rotz atlas at the British Museum during a visit to London following the Peace of Amiens in 1802, claimed in a lecture to the Société Philomathique de Paris in 1803 that its Londe of Java was evidence of a discovery of the east coast of Australia by Portuguese based in the Moluccas, who perhaps were accompanied by French seafarers who thereby found the opportunity to obtain the intelligence upon which the map, and others of the Dieppe school, was prepared. His claim was refuted by Frédéric Metz in a letter to the Revue Philosophique, Littéraire et Politique of 11 Novembre 1805. Metz noted the absence of New Guinea and the Gulf of Carpentaria, and pointed out that a chart that recorded the voyage of navigators who had gone as far as the southern extremity of the east coast of Australia could not have failed to indicate the breadth of sea that separated Australia from Java, whereas the Rotz map showed only a narrow channel between the two. Lees and Laffan argued that this was due to the mosaicking of sources with incompatible understandings of the size of the Earth.

== See also ==
- France-Asia relations
