= Locach =

Country mentioned by Marco Polo

Lochac, Locach or Locat is a country far south of China mentioned by Marco Polo. The name is widely believed to be a variant of Lo-huk 罗斛: the Cantonese name for the southern Thai kingdom of Lopburi (also known as Lavapura and Louvo), which was a province of the Khmer Empire at the time. (Note: The names Lavapura or Louvo originate from Sanskrit Lava, in Hindu mythology the son of Rama. In Thai, Lava is spelled Lab, pronounced Lop’h; hence the name Lop’haburī, or Lop’ha-purī ลพบุรี (Lopburi). Louvo was united with Siam in 1350.)

However, it has also been suggested that Polo or his sources in China were referring to other locations or conflating several different places as Lochac.

In Vietnam, Lopburi was referred to as Lộ Hạc. The Complete History of Đại Việt, the oldest Vietnamese dynastic history, records that in the year 1149 merchant ships from the three countries Trảo Oa (Java), Lộ Hạc and Xiêm La (Siam) entered the Hải Đông (Gulf of Tonking) and requested permission to trade on the island of Vân Đồn. The same work further records that in the year 1360, merchant ships belonging to the countries of Lộ Hạc, Tráo Oa and Xiêm La came to the island of Vân Đồn carrying foreign goods to trade. The editor of the Complete History of Đại Việt, Ngô Đức Thọ, says: "Lộ Hạc is Lavo in Lopburi province, Thailand. Lộ Hạc is likely to be the country of Locac mentioned in Marco Polo's Travels".

== Theories regarding Lopburi and the Khmer Empire ==
Marco Polo may also have used "Locach" to mean the Khmer Empire in general. One piece of evidence for this is the "golden towers" that Polo reported in Locach, which were more likely inspired by the golden spires of Angkor Wat, the capital of the Khmer Empire (than the Lopburi of his time). As Zhou Daguan, the ambassador sent by the Yuan court to Cambodia in 1296 commented: "These [golden towers] are the monuments that have caused merchants from overseas to speak so often of ‘Zhenla [Cambodia] the rich and noble’."

The imprisonment of a Mongol emissary by the Khmer ruler Jayavarman VIII in 1281 would have been ample justification for Polo's allegation of the inhumanity of its people. He said that Locach was "such a savage place that few people ever go there" and that "the king himself does not want anyone to go there or to spy out his treasure or the state of his realm". Polo also noted an abundance of elephants in Locach; in the Chinese annals, Locach was notable for sending elephants as tribute.

== Subsequent maps and theories ==
On Gerard Mercator's 1538 map of the world, Locat is situated in Indochina, south of Champa (Ciamba). On his 1569 world map, "the Kingdom of Locach" (Lucach regnum) and Beach were shown as a northward extension of the Terra Australis to the south of Java with an inscription, quoting Marco Polo, “Beach the gold-bearing province”. Mercator's source was the account of Marco Polo's Travels published in Novus Orbis Regionum ac Insularum Veteribus Incognitarum.

Abraham Ortelius identified the Regio Patalis, a large promontory of the Terra Australis shown on Oronce Fine's world maps of 1531 and 1536, with Locach on his world map of 1564. He inscribed on the eastern side of the northward extension of the Southern Continent: “This tract is called by some Patalis". The western side of the same promontory, he inscribed: "The Region of Locach seems to be placed here by M. Polo the Venetian".

Pentan mentioned by Polo appears to be the island of Bintan. Likewise Malaiur was the old Tamil name for the Sumatran city of Jambi (and is the origin of the national name Malay).

On Guillaume Le Testu’s 1556 Cosmographie Universel, Locach appears to be named La Joncade – an island off a promontory of the southern continent, Terre australle, to the eastward of Grande Jaue, a northward-extending promontory of the Terre australle (Terra Australis) to the south of Java. However, some scholars see in La Jocade a resemblance to the North Island of New Zealand.

A mistranscription of Locach, Beach, originated with the 1532 editions of the Novus Orbis Regionum by Simon Grynaeus and Johann Huttich, in which Marco Polo's Locach was changed to Boëach, which was later shortened to Beach.

Abraham Ortelius inscribed on his 1564 world map: Latinum exemplar habet Boeach sed male ut fere omnium: Nos italico usi fuimus (A Latin version has Boeach, but mistakenly: like almost everyone we have used the Italian). Mercator ignored this correction on his 1569 world map.

By the late seventeenth century, the location and even the existence of Beach was generally considered doubtful, as the geographer Michel Antoine Baudrand put it:“Beach, a large region, placed as a part of the Southland [Terra Australis] on many maps, but where it was, or by whom it was discovered, there is a deep silence among authors, and from the more recent of them it is clear that there is no region so called in all the Southland and in the parts discovered by Europeans.”

In 1769, the East India Company hydrographer, Alexander Dalrymple, stated that the northern part of New Holland "seems to be what Marco-Polo calls Lochae".

Paul Wheatley, after G. Pauthier (who reads Locach as Soucat), and Henry Yule (1866), believe that the place referred to was in Borneo, such as: West Kalimantan, Sukadana or Lawai (arch. Laue; Lawai, near the Kapuas River).

According to a recent Chinese version of The Travels of Marco Polo translated by Chen Kaijun, etc., Marco Polo traveled to islands Sondur and Kondur, 1,126 km south of Java, and then traveled 80 km southeast and arrived at Lochac 罗斛. As pointed out by Robert J. King, this version is based on a misunderstanding of Marco's itinerary in the version of the Travels contained in the 1532 compilation by Simon Grynaeus and Johann Huttich. This was used as a source for the Mercator 1569 world map. Grynaeus and Huttich used a version of the Travels in which Locach (or Boëach as it was mistakenly transcribed, or Beach as it was written by Mercator) was located 1700 miles to the south of Java instead of Champa. The 1570 world map of Jean Cossin using sinusoidal projection shows lucac (Locach) in the same location. Chen's version was based on Manuel Komroff's 1926 edition of William Marsden's 1818 English translation of The travels of Marco Polo but ignored Marsden's note saying that although Marco did not visit Java the early transcribers of his manuscript edited it to make it appear that he did and therefore mis-located Pulo Condore and Locach far to its south.
