= Jean Alfonse =

Portuguese explorer (c. 1484 – 1544 or 1549)

- Born: Jean Fonteneau, dit Alfonse de Saintonge c. 1484; Portugal
- Died: December 1544 (aged 59–60) or December 1549 (aged 64–65); La Rochelle, France
- Occupations: navigator, explorer and corsair

Signature
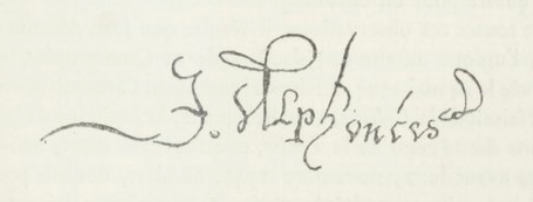

Jean Fonteneau, dit Alfonse de Saintonge (also spelled Jean Allefonsce) or João Afonso in Portuguese (also spelled João Alfonso) (c. 1484 – December 1544 or 1549) was a Portuguese navigator, explorer and corsair, prominent in the European Age of Discovery. He had an early career in Portugal and later served the King of France.

== Early years and personal life ==
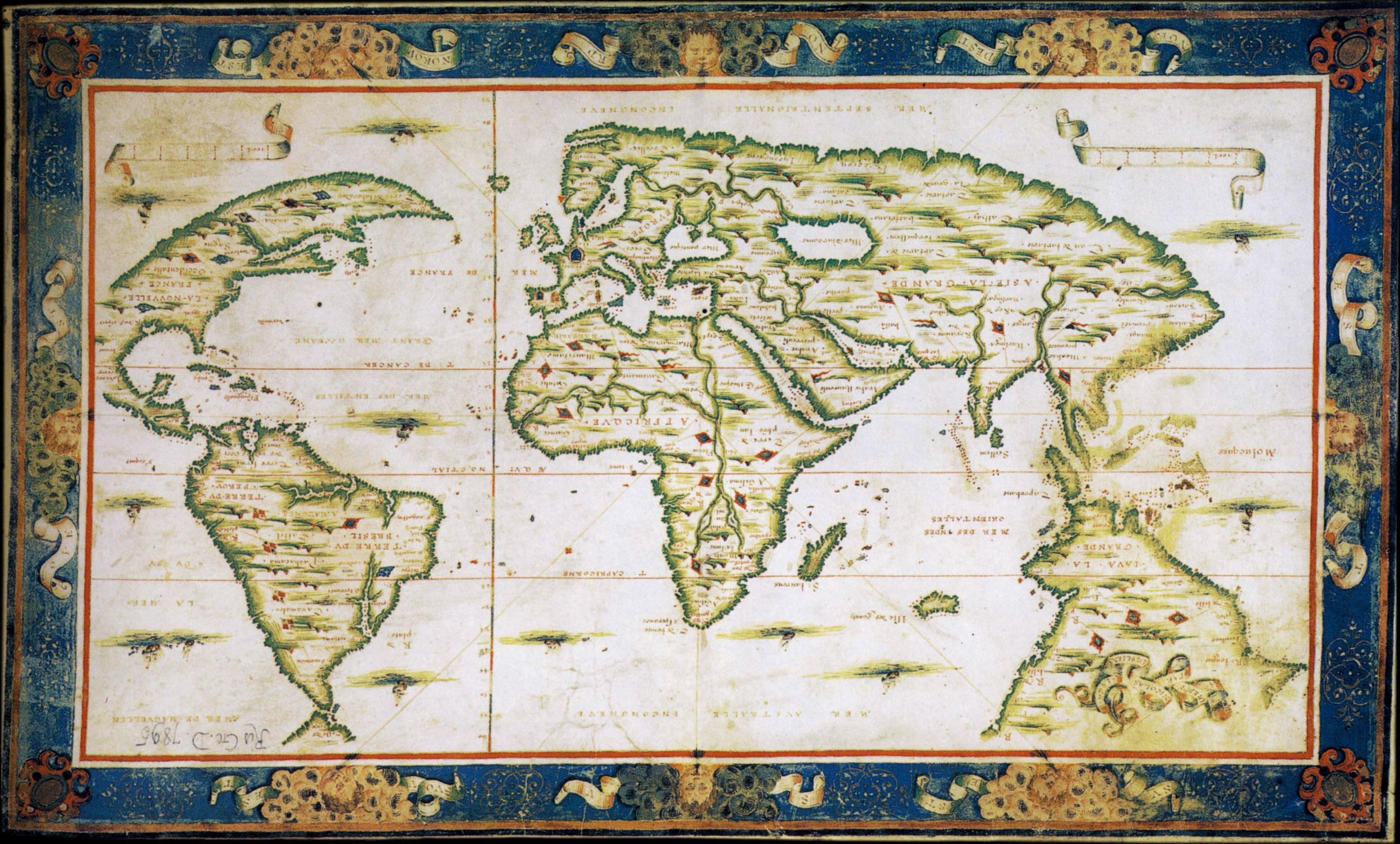
World Map of Nicolas Desliens, c. 1566. João Afonso's writings and Cosmographies (also based on his previous voyages to the East and the West) inspired and helped the Dieppe School in France

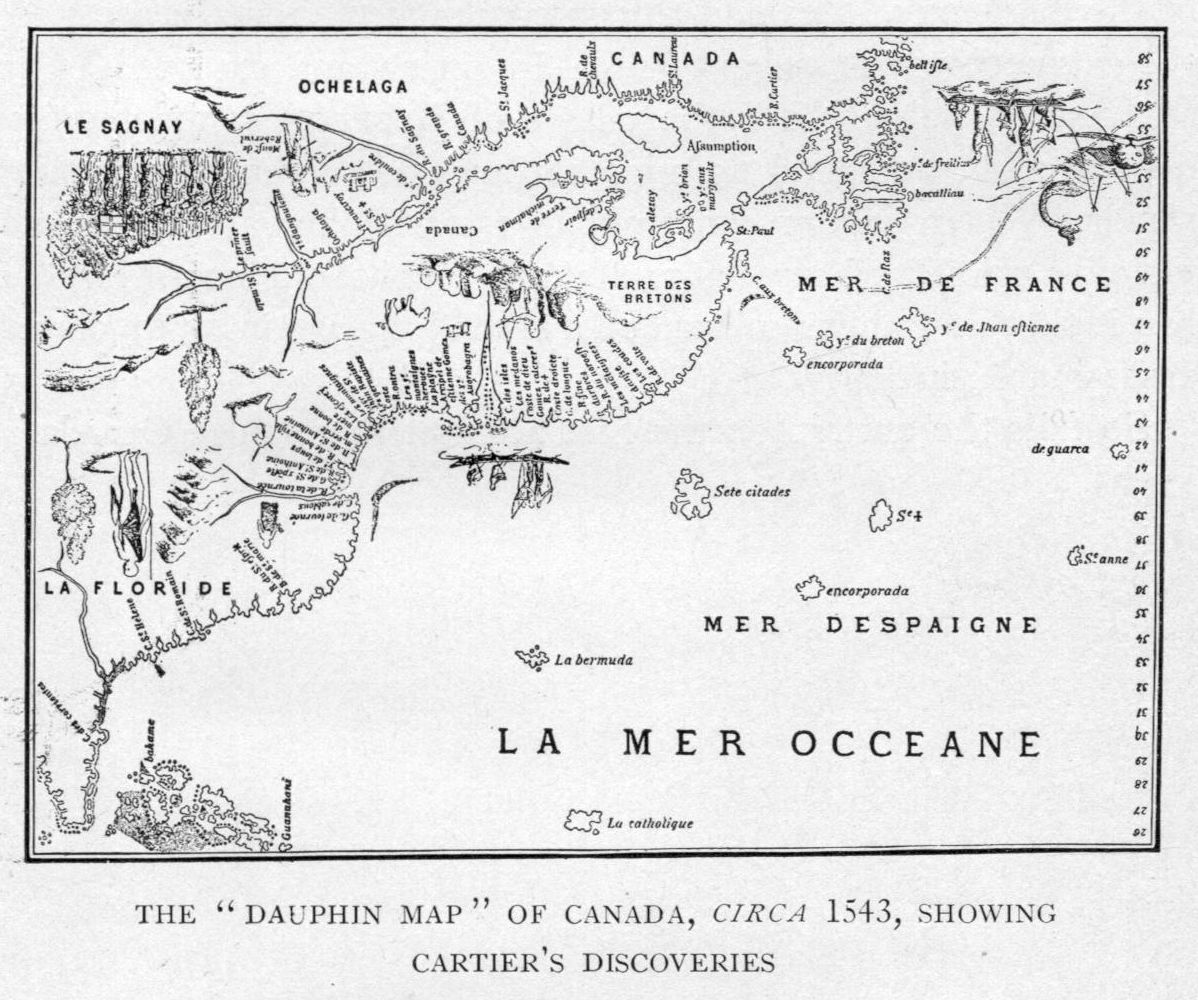
The Dauphin Map of Canada, c. 1543, showing Cartier's discoveries and explorations. A region explored by the pilot Jean Alfonse in 1542–1543

Born João Afonso and later known in France as Jean Fonteneau or Alfonse of Saintonge, he married a woman named Valentine Alfonse (Valentina Alfonso). Taking to the sea at age 12, he joined the Portuguese India Armadas and the Portuguese commercial fleets as they sailed past the seven seas to the coasts of Brazil, Western Africa, and around the Cape to Madagascar and Asia. His writings talk of days lasting three months, and of a vast southern continent, the Terra Australis, and the Jave la Grande, which he claims to have seen south of Southeast Asia, possibly suggesting he had approached the Arctic (by North America), Australia, and Antarctica.

== In service of France ==
Before or around 1530, for some reasons, he moved to France putting himself at the service of Francis I. The correspondence of diplomatic agents of the king of Portugal in France, in the first half of the century, tried to clarify the causes of this change of allegiance. Gaspar Palha, a Portuguese diplomat in Paris in 1531, having met a man from La Rochelle to whom he requested information concerning the pilot Jean Alfonse, wrote that he had been exiled because, when he was lost near the coast of Brittany hit by a storm, he had been involved in a quarrel (according to what was reported, with his own oldest son) that resulted in the death of his son or some man aboard; and that consequently he had been exiled and did not dare to appear in public, but it is a report by indirect testimony, and there may have been other non-criminal reasons for the exile. However, it appears that it was to escape the Portuguese Justice for some reason. Jean Alfonse left the country, later in the company of his wife and his sons. In 1531, John III of Portugal attempted to repatriate the defector pilot because of his high qualifications and for his vast and possible classified knowledge. The king himself corresponded directly with Afonso, sending letters of pardon by his ambassadors and representatives and later exchanging letters with him in this attempt.

By the 1540s, he was a renowned pilot, leading fleets to Africa and the Caribbean and reputed to have never lost a ship. André Thévet mentions a conversation where Alfonse described looting Puerto Rico as a corsair. It was long thought that the Rabelaisian hero Xenomanes was based on Alfonse.

In 1542–1543, Alfonse piloted Jean-François de la Roque de Roberval's attempt to colonize Canada on the heels of Jacques Cartier's third voyage there. Alfonse established that one could sail through a passage between Greenland and Labrador. The crew of 200, including prisoners and a few women, spent a harsh winter on the shores of the St. Lawrence River, hit by scurvy and losing a quarter of the colonists before sailing back to France. During this trip, Alfonse described a land he called Norombega writing that "Fifteen leagues within this river there is a city called Norombegue with clever inhabitants and a mass of peltries of all kinds of beasts. The citizens dress in furs, wearing sable cloaks. . . The people use many words which sound like Latin and worship the sun, and they are fair people and tall." From a sketch he made of what he called the "Riviere de Norenbegue" the river has been identified as the Penobscot River.

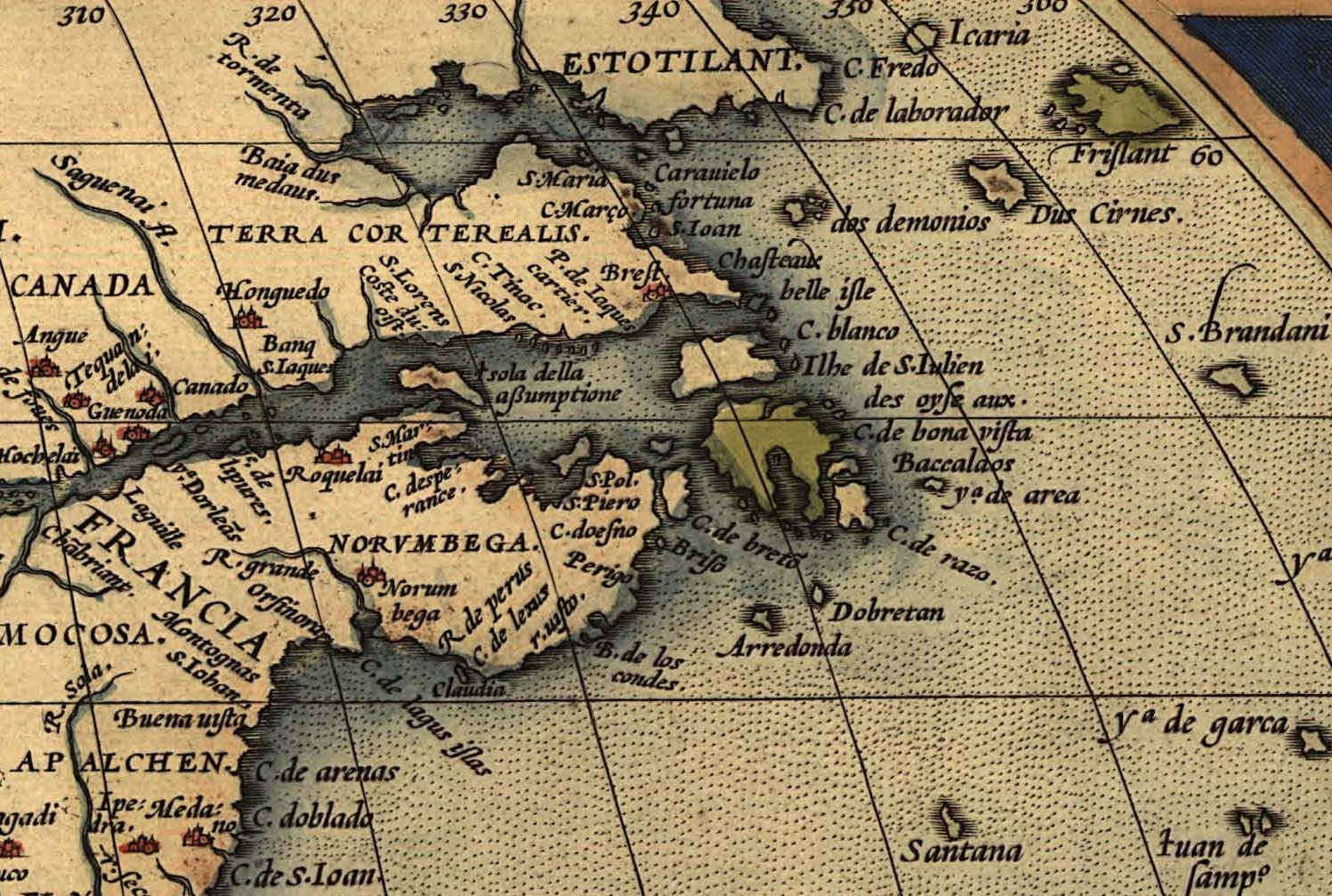
Part of Abraham Ortelius atlas from 1570, showing "Norvmbega" among other more or less mythical names for various areas (as well as several phantom islands)

In late 1544, Alfonse left La Rochelle with a small fleet and disrupted Basque shipping, while the treaty of Crépy had just been signed between France and Spain. A Spanish fleet led by Pedro Menéndez de Avilés caught up to him as he was getting back to La Rochelle and killed him at sea. Some sources say this fatal encounter occurred in 1549.

== Works ==
His writings were published as Les voyages avantureux du Capitaine Ian Alfonce (1559), the Rutter of Jean Alphonse (1600) and La cosmographie avec l’espère et régime du soleil du nord par Jean Fonteneau dit Alfonse de Saintonge, capitaine-pilote de François Ier (manuscript dated 1545, first published in 1904). In them he describes the various places and peoples he and others have seen, many of them for the first time in print (such as Gaspé, the Beothuk, Saint-Pierre Island, the jewels of Madagascar, a continent south of Java) and provides navigational instructions on how to get there.

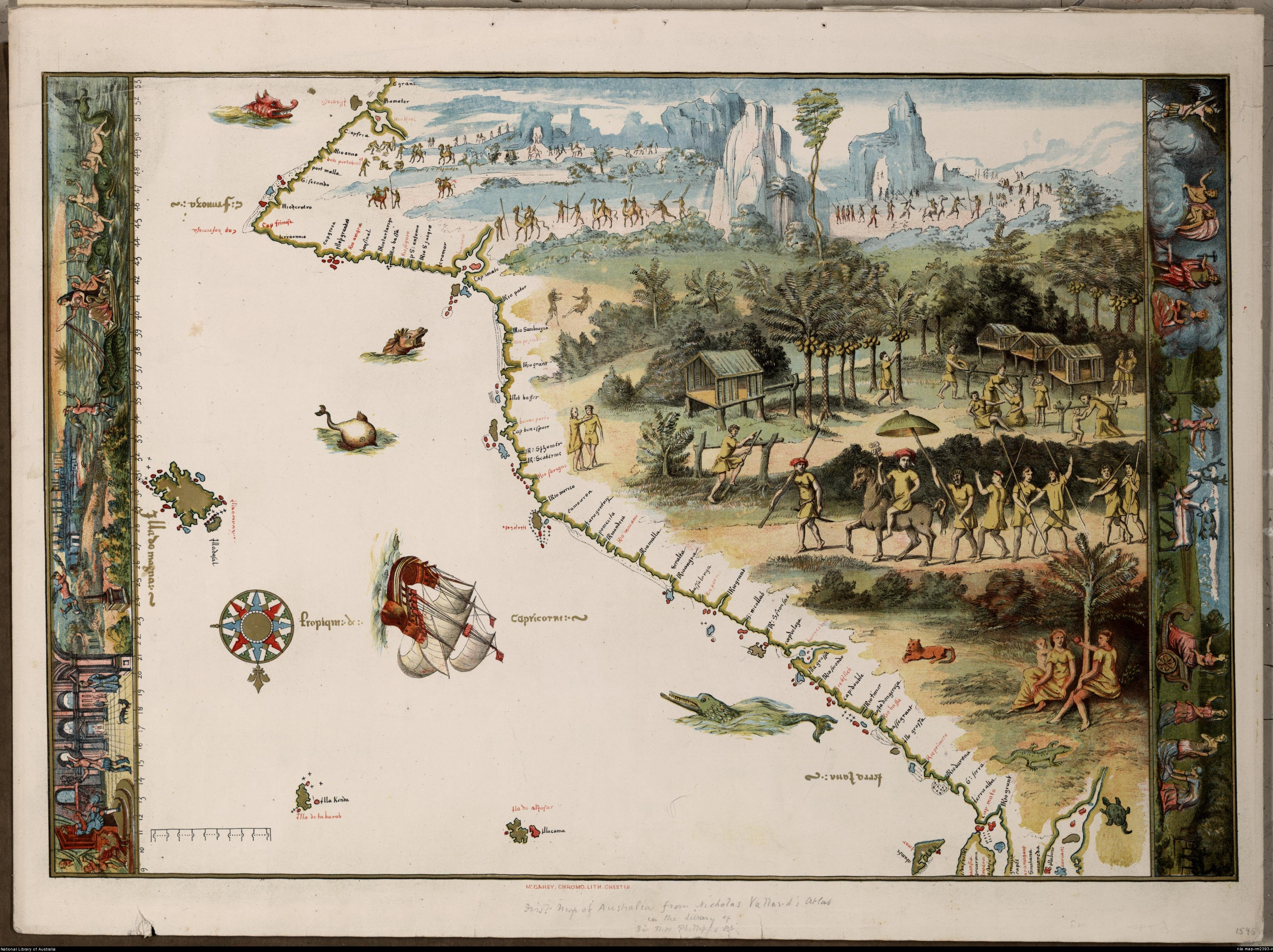
Jave La Grande's east coast: from Nicholas Vallard's atlas, 1547. Copy held by the National Library of Australia
