= Jacques de Vaulx =

Jacques de Vaulx or Devaulx, sometimes spelled de Vaux (Le Havre ca. 1557–1597), was a cosmographer and deep-sea pilot, and the author of a handwritten navigation manual entitled Premières Œuvres de Jacques de Vaulx, conceived during his voyage to the Americas.

== Works ==
Premières Œuvres is a manuscript treatise on navigation, hydrography, and cartography for sailors. A first version, dated 1583, is dedicated to Admiral de Joyeuse. It consists of 31 richly-illustrated and annotated folios. A slightly improved second version dates from 1584. The illustrations depict the determination of longitude using the micrometry of a magnet, the measurement of magnetic declination on land with a compass and an alidade aimed at Polaris, and the observation of the angular altitude of a celestial body with Jacob's staff. One folio also shows three navigators on land using compasses and an astrolabe to try to determine their longitude. The method of arranging compass roses is illustrated.

Jacques de Vaulx is also the author of a map of America dated 1584, a large parchment (0.58m x 0.81m) in the shape of a half planisphere, which takes into account previous explorations and presents itself as “a true political map of the American continent” in its time.
