= Jean Parmentier (explorer) =

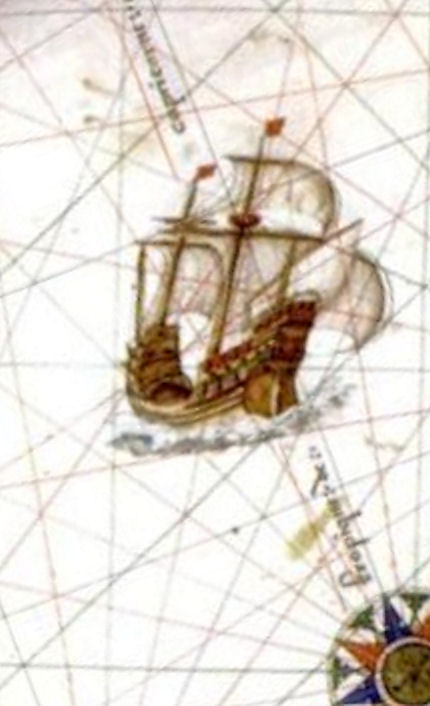
Sailing ship near Java la Grande in Vallard Atlas 1547, Dieppe school.

Jean Parmentier (1494–1529), born in Dieppe, France, was a navigator, cartographer, and poet. Jean and his brother Raoul made numerous voyages for the shipowner Jean Ango.

In 1531 Pierre Crignon, published a collection of Jean's poetry. Although Jean was well known as a cartographer, none of his maps have survived.

In their voyages he supposedly was accompanied by "Jean Sasi, le grand Peintre". Upon their return they triggered the development of the Dieppe maps, influencing the work of Dieppe cartographers, such as Jean Rotz.

== Works ==
- Journal du voyage de Jean Parmentier, de Dieppe, à l'Ile de Sumatra en l'année 1529

== See also ==
- France-Asia relations
