= Guillaume Le Testu =

French explorer, navigator and privateer

- Born: c. 1509; Le Havre, Normandy, France
- Died: April 29, 1573 (aged 64) near Nombre de Dios, Panama
- Cause of death: Beheaded
- Other name: Guillaume Le Tetu
- Occupations: Explorer, navigator, cartographer and privateer
- Known for: Cartographer of the Dieppe maps and world atlas in 1555; alleged to have been the first European to map Australia.

Guillaume Le Testu, sometimes referred to as Guillaume Le Têtu (c. 1509-12 – April 29, 1573), was a French privateer, explorer and navigator. He was one of the foremost cartographers of his time and an author of the Dieppe maps. His maps were distinguished by their sophistication and detail; they influenced generations of cartographers, navigators and explorers.

Le Testu was successful as a privateer during the early years of the French Wars of Religion. In 1573, he and Sir Francis Drake attacked a Spanish mule train escorting gold and silver to Nombre de Dios on the Atlantic coast of Panama, and he was subsequently killed following his capture by the Spanish.

Suggestions that Le Testu may have mapped (or even visited) Australia are based on: first, his maps' depiction of a large island (or continent), south of Java, which Le Testu identified as the Jave la Grande ("Java Major" or "Great Java") mentioned by Marco Polo (and was otherwise known at the time as Terra Australis) and second, Le Testu's incorporation in these maps of birds that resemble black swans and cassowaries, which are both native to Australia. However, he did not claim to have seen Jave la Grande in person and many cartographers at the time incorporated hypothetical, mythological or fantastic elements, a practice that is clearly also true of Le Testu. His maps also showed unicorns and monstrous creatures such as 200 metre long giant snakes, basilisks, satyrs, Blemmyes (headless humans) and Cynocephalics (dog-headed humans).

Le Testu's work was used by Admiral Gaspard de Coligny and French Huguenots hoping to establish themselves in Brazil, Florida, the Caribbean and even the Terra Australis derived from Le Testu's "Jave la Grande". However, these attempts were abandoned following Coligny's assassination in 1572 and Le Testu's death the following year.

== Biography ==
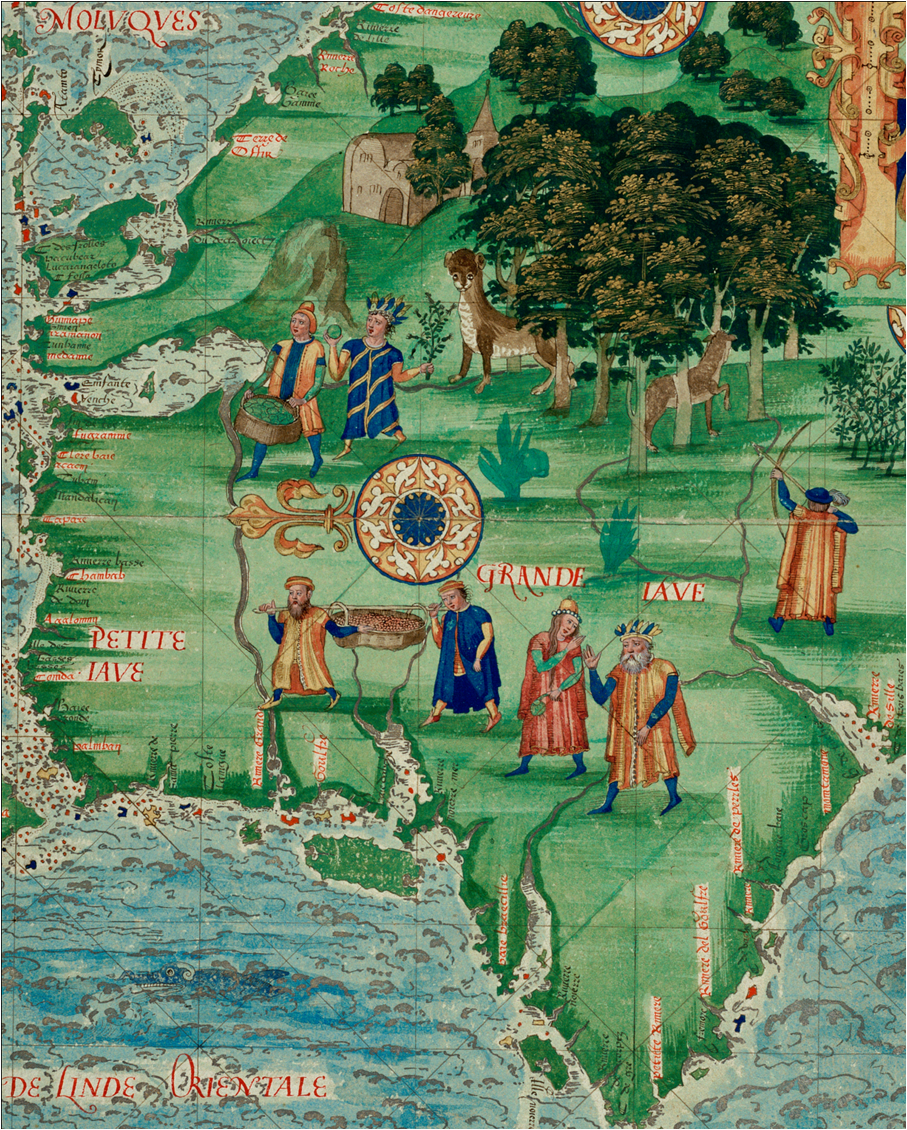
Guillaume Le Testu, Jave la Grande, in Cosmographie Universelle, 1555/56. Note that North is to the left.

Guillaume le Testu was born sometime around 1509–12, in either Le Havre, Normandy or Grasse, Provence.

He was one of the last students to be taught cartography at the famed school of Dieppe. Le Testu subsequently took part in voyages of exploration throughout the Atlantic Ocean.

In 1550, Le Testu was commissioned by King Henry II to create a map of the Americas, particularly where the French were trading. In June 1551, he sailed to Brazil on both an exploration and reconnaissance mission from Henry II, charting as far as the Rio de la Plata. His ship, the Salamandre, reached as far south as 26 latitude a fair distance past present-day Rio de Janeiro. In late December, he became involved in a firefight with two Portuguese ships near Trinidad and sustained heavy damage to his ship, although he was successful in mapping much of the South American coastline by the time of his return to Dieppe in July 1552.

Le Testu was also involved in the founding of a French colony near Rio de Janeiro in 1555.

In 1555 or 1556, Le Testu composed a world atlas entitled Cosmographie Universelle selon les Navigateurs, tant anciens que modernes and was consequently awarded the title of Pilote Royale by Henry II. The Cosmographie Universelle contained 56 maps reportedly based on charts Le Testu had personally drawn by hand on his expeditions. This atlas extolled the military triumphs and imperialist dreams of the French monarchy, and was dedicated to Le Testu's mentor and patron Admiral Gaspard de Coligny, who had become leader of the Huguenots three years earlier. The manuscript was based on charts from French, Spanish and Portuguese sources supplied by Coligny. Included in this atlas were twelve charts of Jave le Grand/Terra Australis, which Le Testu located southward of the Moluccas. Le Testu commented: "However, what I have marked and depicted is only by imagination, and I have not noted or remarked on any of the commodities or incommodities of the place, nor its mountains, rivers or other things; for there has never yet been any man who has made a certain discovery of it." Coligny subsequently supported a proposal from the d'Albagno brothers, for an expedition to Terra Australis to investigate the possibility of a French colony there.

Cosmographie Universelle selon les Navigateurs, tant anciens que modernes (1555/56).
The present Figure contains a part of Jave la Grande [Java Major], which is situated in the southern part in the Temperate Zone. The inhabitants of it are Idolaters, ignorant of God, and in it grows Nutmeg with Cloves, and several other kinds of fruits and spices... This is La Grant Jave [Java Major], and La Petite Jave [Java Minor] in which there are eight Kingdoms. The men of these two Countries are Idolaters and wicked. Several manner of spices grow in these two Regions, such as Nutmeg, Cloves, and other spices... This Land is part of the so-called Terra Australis, to us Unknown, so that which is marked herein is only from Imagination and uncertain opinion; for some say that La Grant Jave [Java Major] which is the eastern Coast of it is the same land of which the western Coast forms the Strait of Magellan, and that all of this land is joined together... This Part is the same Land of the south called Austral, which has never yet been discovered, for there is no account of anyone having yet found it, and therefore nothing has been remarked of it but from Imagination. I have not been able to describe any of its resources, and for this reason I leave speaking further of it until more ample discovery has been made, and as much as I have written and annoted names to several of its capes this has only been to align the pieces depicted herein to the views of others and also so that those who navigate there be on their guard when they are of opinion that they are approaching the said Land... This piece is a part of the Southland or Terra Australis, from Imagination situated under the Frigid Zone, forasmuch as some are of the opinion that the Land of the Strait of Magellan and La Grande Java [Java Major] are joined together. This is not yet known for certain, and for this Reason I am unable to describe its Resources.

— Guillaume Le Testu

Three centuries later, the English scholar Edward Jenks suggested that a chart said to have been created in 1542 and later held by the British Museum may have been Le Testu's source for Jave la Grande. Le Testu's Cosmographie Universelle (1555) and world atlas (1556) are both in the Bibliothèque Nationale in Paris. The map, said Jenks, was said to have been “the property of a man named Rotz, a French sailor who passed some part of his life in England”. Jenks commented: “this fact gives some colour to the claim put forward by the French, that their countryman, Guillaume le Testu, was the true discoverer of Australia. The claim is based mainly upon the fact that Testu’s name appears on a map dated 1555, on which a southern continent, styled Jave la Grande (“Great Java”), is outlined. But this fact, of course, merely proves that Testu had heard of such a country..."

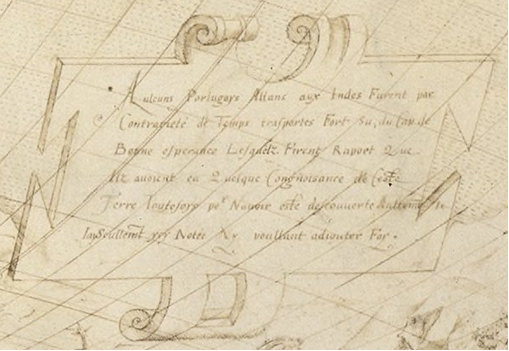
Aulcuns portugais allans aux Indes furent par contrariété de temps transportés fort Su du cap de Bonne esperance. Lesquelz firent raport que ils avoient eu quelque cognoissance de ceste Terre. Toutefoys pour navoir esté descouverte aultrement Iay seullement ycy notée ny voullant adiouter Foy [Certain Portuguese going to the Indies were, by adverse weather conditions, carried far south of the Cape of Good Hope. They made report that they had had some knowledge of this land. Nevertheless, it not having been otherwise discovered, I have merely noted it here, not willing to add credence to it]. Guillaume Le Testu, Mappemonde en deux hémisphères, Le Havre, 1566.Le Testu, Mappemonde, 1566

The next several years saw the outbreak of the French Wars of Religion, civil wars between the Huguenots and Catholics; in 1567, Le Testu sided with the Protestant Huguenots, conducting privateering raids for two years before his capture by the Catholics. He would remain imprisoned for over four years until he was released by order of King Charles IX, due to public interest on his behalf.

=== Raid on Nombre de Dios and death ===
On March 23, 1573, Le Testu unexpectedly encountered Sir Francis Drake near "Cabo de Cativas", near Cativá, Panama. Le Testu was in command of the 80-ton warship Havre (or the New Haven) with a crew of seventy; although it is unknown what Le Testu's mission was, he may have been there at the behest of an Italian sponsor. He reportedly presented to Drake a scimitar, formerly belonging to the condottiero Piero Strozzi, as a gift on behalf of Coligny. It was during this meeting, having brought news of the St. Bartholomew's Day massacre, that he offered to join Drake in a final raid against a Spanish mule train en route to Nombre de Dios before leaving the area.

He and Drake sailed their combined fleet to the "Francisco River" (probably Rio Cuango, near Cuango, Panama). Le Testu and Drake landed with their men just east of Nombre de Dios. Le Testu had 70 men under his command while Drake himself led 31 men including his Cimarron allies. As their ships sailed off, with orders to return for them in four days, the party headed inland to a spot two leagues south of the city, arriving on April 29, where they awaited the Spanish mule train. It was soon after their arrival that the party heard bells in the distance signaling the arrival of the caravan. Cimarrons scouts also warned of their approach reporting the size of the caravan consisting of almost 200 mules each carrying up to three hundred pounds of treasure. Drake had chosen the spot for the ambush, believing the Spaniards to be at their most vulnerable as they were nearing their destination after traveling through miles of jungle, to take the mule train off guard in a surprise attack. They drove off the Spanish guards, although at a cost of several Cimarron and Frenchmen.

The attack was a complete success and nearly 30 tons of gold and silver were captured by Drake and Le Testu. Between 80,000 and 100,000 pesos in gold were taken by the privateers: in fact, there was so much treasure that the privateers were unable carry all the silver off and buried what remained. Le Testu's share came to £20,000. However, he was seriously wounded during the first assault and chose to rest with two of his men by the roadside until he was able to travel. As the rest of the party continued to meet the scheduled rendezvous with their fleet, they discovered a Spanish fleet waiting for them instead. Drake was forced to construct a raft and sail out to an island roughly three leagues offshore, where he contacted his own ships. Safely aboard with his crew once more, he sent a rescue party back for La Testu. When Drake's men returned, they reported that Le Testu and his men had been caught by Spanish soldiers and executed. Le Testu was beheaded. One of his men had also been tortured until he revealed the location of most of the buried silver. Le Testu's head was taken back to Nombre de Dios where it was displayed in the marketplace.

Drake's men had managed to find some silver which had been missed, which they brought back to split between the English and French crews before sailing back for Europe. The surviving French later complained the English had taken the majority of the proceeds, however.

It is possible that Le Testu mentioned plans for an expedition to Jave la Grand/Terra Australis to Drake and his associates, and/or otherwise inspired Drake's voyage to the Pacific Ocean and circumnavigation of the world during 1576–1578.
