= Oronce Fine =

French mathematician and cartographer

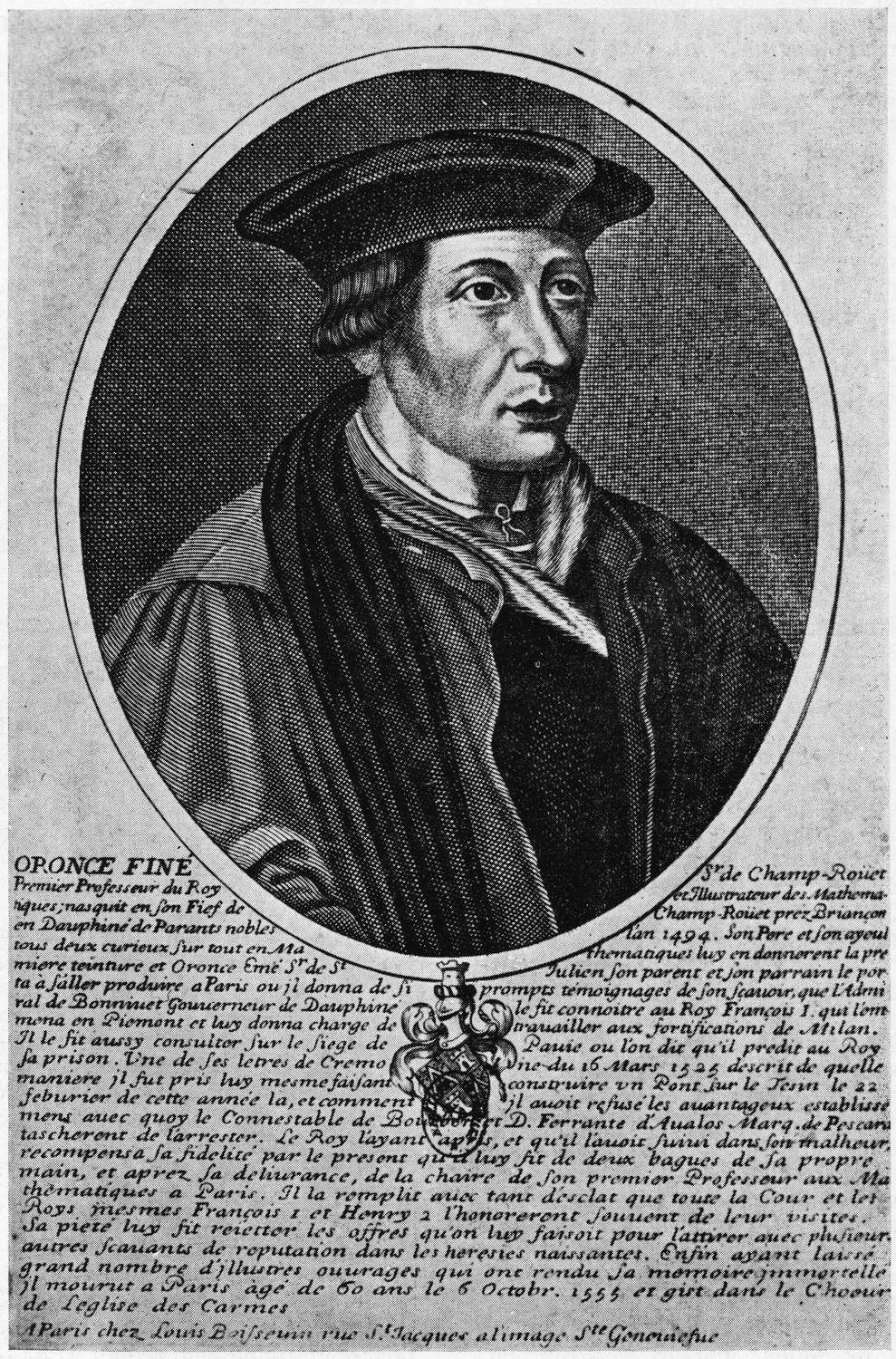
- Oronce Fine
- Born: 20 December 1494; Briançon, France
- Died: 8 August 1555 (age 60); Paris, France
- Scientific career
- Fields: Cartography, mathematics

Oronce Fine (or Finé; Latin: Orontius Finnaeus or Finaeus; Italian: Oronzio Fineo; 20 December 1494 – 8 August 1555) was a French mathematician, cartographer, editor and book illustrator.

== Life ==
Born in Briançon, the son and grandson of physicians, he was educated in Paris (Collège de Navarre) and obtained a degree in medicine in 1522.

Fine grew up in an academic household, and his parents' contribution to the sciences was notable in France at the time. Much of Fine's early childhood was shaped by his father's involvement and support of sciences. Fine's father in addition to being a physician was a strong student in astronomy. He had created many astronomical instruments and published a treatise which was one of the few astronomical incunabula of French origin.

Fine's university was known as a leading center at Paris for the study of scholastic philosophy and theology. There he fostered his editing ability and later printed many editions of writings from scholars. It is believed that his career ended abruptly when he was imprisoned, for reasons that are highly disputed.

In 1531, he was appointed to the chair of mathematics at the Collège Royal (the present Collège de France), founded by King Francis I, where he taught until his death.

In time, as the first chair of mathematics he had become one of the leading mathematicians of France. Arguably, one of his most significant contributions to sciences is his published compilation of the four main areas of mathematics that he named Protomathesis. Fine was known by his peers to be much more than just a mathematician, though. He taught at the French College Royal as the first Royal Lecturer in mathematics, he made instruments, and oversaw Paris's printing houses. He was also influential to the lives of students, particularly Pedro Nunes and Petrus Ramus as well as many others, and inspired them to continue their scholastic endeavors.

Although he leaves a great legacy in regard to his published papers of mathematics, he suffered financial problems and legal issues throughout his career. He worked as an illustrator and proof reader for Paris's print houses in hopes relieving the financial strain brought on by his six children and his father's death. Unfortunately, his efforts were not enough which added to his family's poverty drastically after he died. Making the matters worse for his children, his wife died shortly after Fine's death.

== Mathematics ==
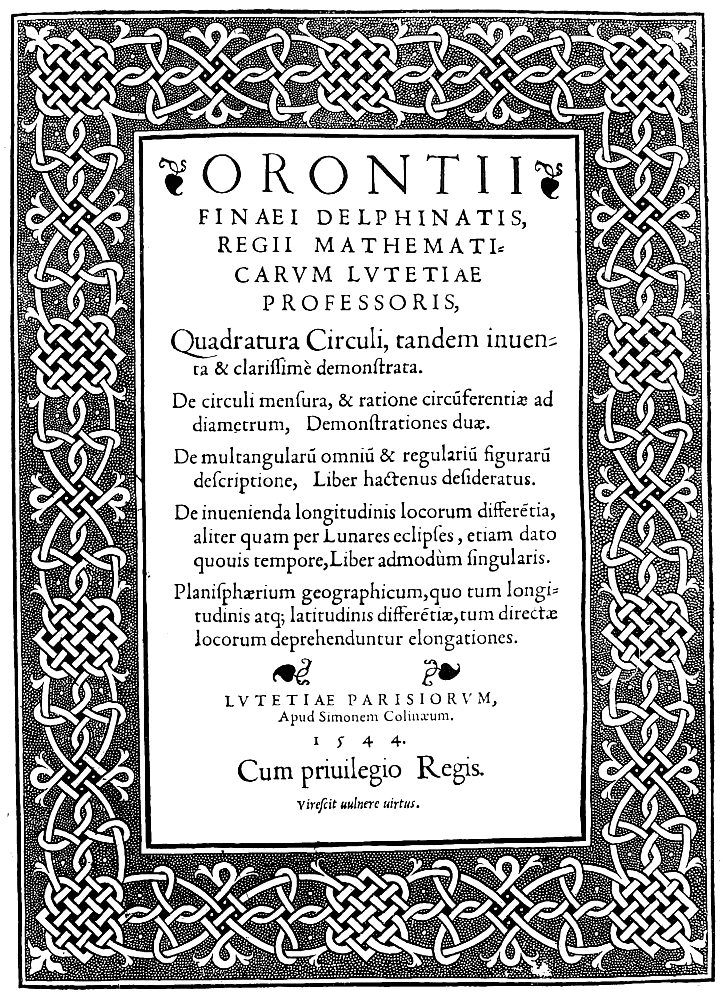
Quadratura circuli, 1544

Fine made contribution to mathematics. He was the first mathematics teacher to be a royal lecturer, and popularized mathematical teaching all over France. He was tasked with making math more transparent and to reform the curriculum that was being taught in France at the time. Fine was faced with having to incorporate practical branches of math that could be used in other areas like medicine, law, and theology.

To display his new teachings and developments, he released a collection of his work through his Protomathesis. This collection included his teaching on practical math, not only traditional mathematics. The Protomathesis also incorporated both practical and theoretical teachings, which were completely new to France, and changed the way that mathematics was taught and viewed. His study and teachings of mathematics allowed him to also be prolific in a wide range of mathematical fields, including practical geometry, arithmetic, optics, gnomonics, astronomy and instrumentalism.

Fine proposed several approximations to the value of pi. He gave it as (22+2/9)/7 ≈ 3.1746 in 1544. Later, he gave 47/15 ≈ 3.1333 and, in De rebus mathematicis (1556), he gave 3+11/78 ≈ 3.1410.

== Astronomy and geography ==
In 1542 Fine published the astronomy textbook De mundi sphaera (On the Heavenly Spheres), which included woodcut illustrations. His writing on astronomy included guides to the use of astronomical equipment and methods (e.g. the ancient practice of determining longitude through the coordinated observation of lunar eclipses from two fixed points with enough distance between them to make the phenomena appear at different times of the night). He also described more recent innovations, such as an instrument he called a méthéoroscope (an astrolabe modified by adding a compass).

Explanatory work was complemented by direct contributions. His woodcut map of France (1525) is one of the first of its kind. He constructed an ivory sundial in 1524, which still exists.

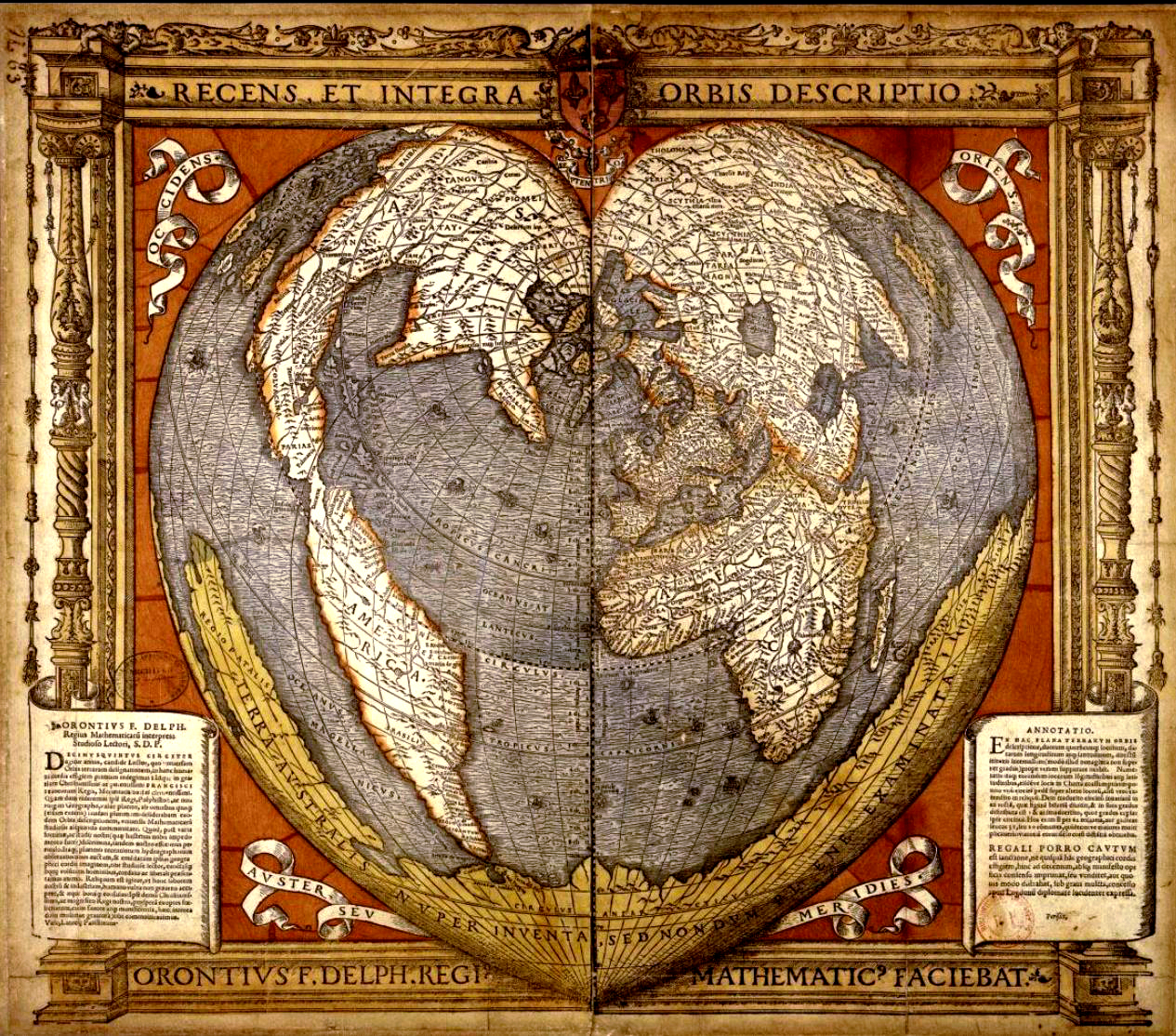
Heart-shaped map of the world

Fine's heart-shaped (cordiform) map projection of 1531 was frequently employed by other cartographers, including Peter Apian and Gerardus Mercator. The map bore a dedicatory inscription that said:

Oronce Fine of the Dauphiny to the Reader: We offer to you, Dear Reader, a representation of the entire world according to the views of modern Geographers and Hydrographers, preserving the proportion of the centre to both the Equator and the latitudes, laid out on a plane in the form of a double human heart; of which the left comprises the northern part and the right the Southern part of the World. Therefore, receive this small gift kindly; and thank Christian Wechel, by whose good will and at whose expense I have shared it with you. Farewell, July, 1531.

Fine attempted to reconcile discoveries in the New World with old medieval legends and information (derived from Ptolemy) regarding the Orient. Thus, on one of his two world maps, Nova Universi Orbis Descriptio (1531), the legend marked Asia covers both North America and Asia, which were represented as one landmass. He used the toponym "America" for South America, and thus Marco Polo's Mangi, Tangut and Catay appear on the shores of the present-day Gulf of Mexico. On the same map, Fine drew Terra Australis to the south, including the legend "recently discovered but not yet completely explored", by which he meant the discovery of Tierra del Fuego by Ferdinand Magellan.

Fine's cosmography was derived from the German mathematician and cosmographer Johannes Schöner. In his study of Schöner's globes, Franz von Wieser found that the derivation of Fine's mappemonde from them was "unmistakeable (unverkennbar)"; he said "Orontius Finaeus took from Schöner not only the Brasilie Regio, but the whole Austral Continent, the Strait of Magellan, and above all the whole arrangement of lands; in a word, the mappemonde of Oronce Fine is a copy of Schöner's". Lucien Gallois also noted the undeniable ressemblance parfaite between Finé's 1531 mappemonde and Schöner's globe of 1533. As Schöner's globe of 1523, which also closely resembled Fine's mappemonde, was not identified until 1925 by Frederik (F.C.) Wieder, Gallois was forced to argue that Fine, who said he had been working on his mappemonde since 1521, had had direct or indirect personal communication with Schöner or had drawn upon his 1515 Luculentissima descriptio. Wieder's identification of Schöner's map globe of 1523 strengthens Gallois' case for Fine's reliance upon Schöner.

Fine's 1536 world map bore a dedicatory inscription in the lower left corner, which stated:

ABOUT FIFTEEN years since, Dear Reader, we first designed, in the shape of a human heart, this universal map of the world, in gratitude to the Most Christian and Most Mighty Francis, King of the French, our most clement Maecenas. For while we saw it pleased the King, a Polymath, and uncommon Geographer, and was praised by many, even in foreign countries, I wanted finally to communicate the same description of the whole globe to all students of Mathematics: which, after variations in fortune and crises in the studies we pursued, which up to now have been a hindrance to us, we have finally done at our own risk. And so, augmented and corrected by many observations of modern hydrographers, the same heart-shaped geographical image we present to yourself, devoted reader and to all men of goodwill of a wise and liberal mind. It remains, therefore, that you will not refuse to accept this labour and industry of ours which has a human appearance, and consult it fairly and well. Finally, while we strive ever more earnestly for the favour and generosity of our Most Christian and magnificent King, whose happiness and success you eagerly desire, we have shared this with you. Farewell, from Paris.

The same map bore another inscription in the lower right corner, which explained how to use the map to accurately measure the distances between places shown on it:

From the description of the world in this map, for any two locations of which the longitudes and latitudes are given (but not exceeding ninety degrees), close to the true direct distance between them can be calculated. Having thus reckoned the longitudes and latitudes of the places, their places in the chart being selected at the same time, place one foot of the compasses over the other places, and extend the other over the rest. Then the compasses trace an invariant straight line, which divides the figure equally, and the degrees are distributed between them; and you will observe how many degrees the compasses take in. If you multiply these by 62 miles, or 31 French leagues, or 20 common ones, by a tenth or more, that way, you will obtain the distances of any of these places.

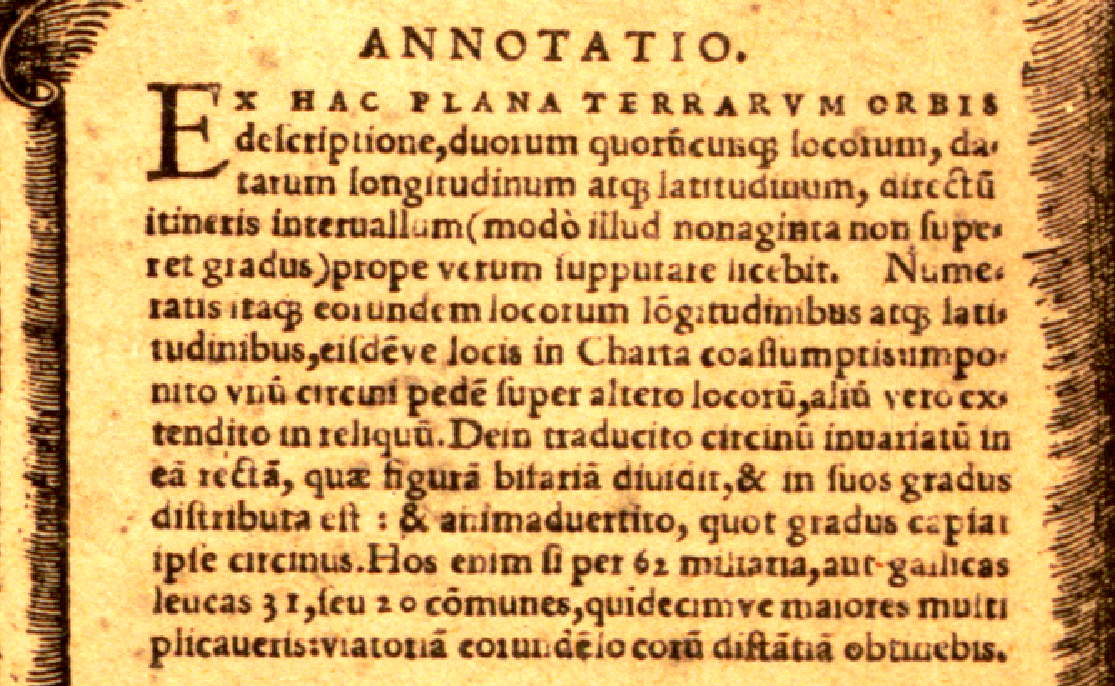
Oronce Fine 1536 Annotatio

== Death and legacy ==
Fine died in Paris at age 60.

Jean Clouet is said to have painted a portrait of Fine in 1530, when Fine was 36. With the original painting lost, the rendering is now known only through prints derived from the original image.

In the famous engraving Fool's Cap Map of the World, the name Orontius Fineus is inscribed in one corner, which is thought to be a Latinized form of Oronce Finé. The artist of Fool's Cap is unknown, but because it was published between 1580 and 1590, long after Finé's death, the inscription is not thought to represent him as the artist but rather the subject of the work's ridicule.

== Honours ==
The lunar crater Orontius and Finaeus Cove in Antarctica are named after Oronce Fine, using his Latinized name.

In May 2016, a square named after Oronce Fine was inaugurated in Paris, France, opposite the École Normale Supérieure, behind the Pantheon.
