= Asia–France relations =

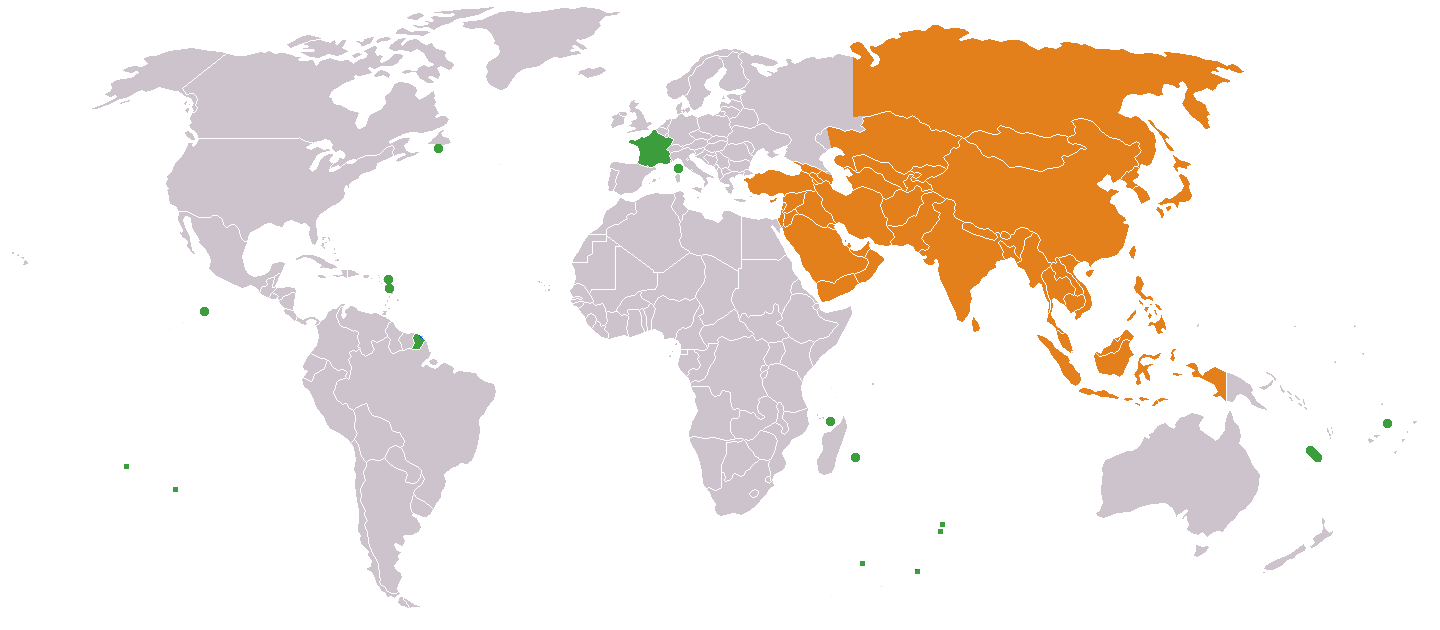
Relations between France and Asia span a period of more than two millennia.

Asia–France relations span a period of more than two millennia, starting in the 6th century BCE with the establishment of Marseille by Greeks from Asia Minor, and continuing in the 3rd century BCE with Gaulish invasions of Asia Minor to form the kingdom of Galatia, and Frankish Crusaders forming the Crusader states. Since these early interactions, France has had a rich history of contacts with the Asian continent.

== Antiquity ==
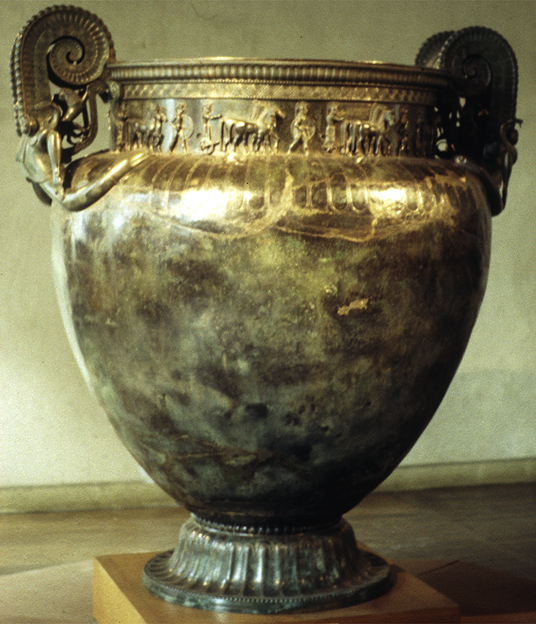
The Vix krater, an imported Greek wine-mixing vessel dated to around 500 BCE attests to the trade exchanges of the period.

The Phoenicians had an early presence around Marseille in southern France. Phoenician inscriptions have been found there.

The oldest city of France, Marseille, was formally founded in 600 BCE by Greeks from the Asia Minor city of Phocaea (as mentioned by Thucydides Book 1, 13, Strabo, Athenaeus and Justin) as a trading port under the name Μασσαλία (Massalia). These eastern Greeks, established on the shores of southern France, were in close relations with the Celtic inhabitants of France, and Greek influence and artifacts penetrated northwards along the Rhône valley. The site of Vix in northern Burgundy became an active trading center between Greeks and natives, attested by the discovery of Greek artifacts of the period.

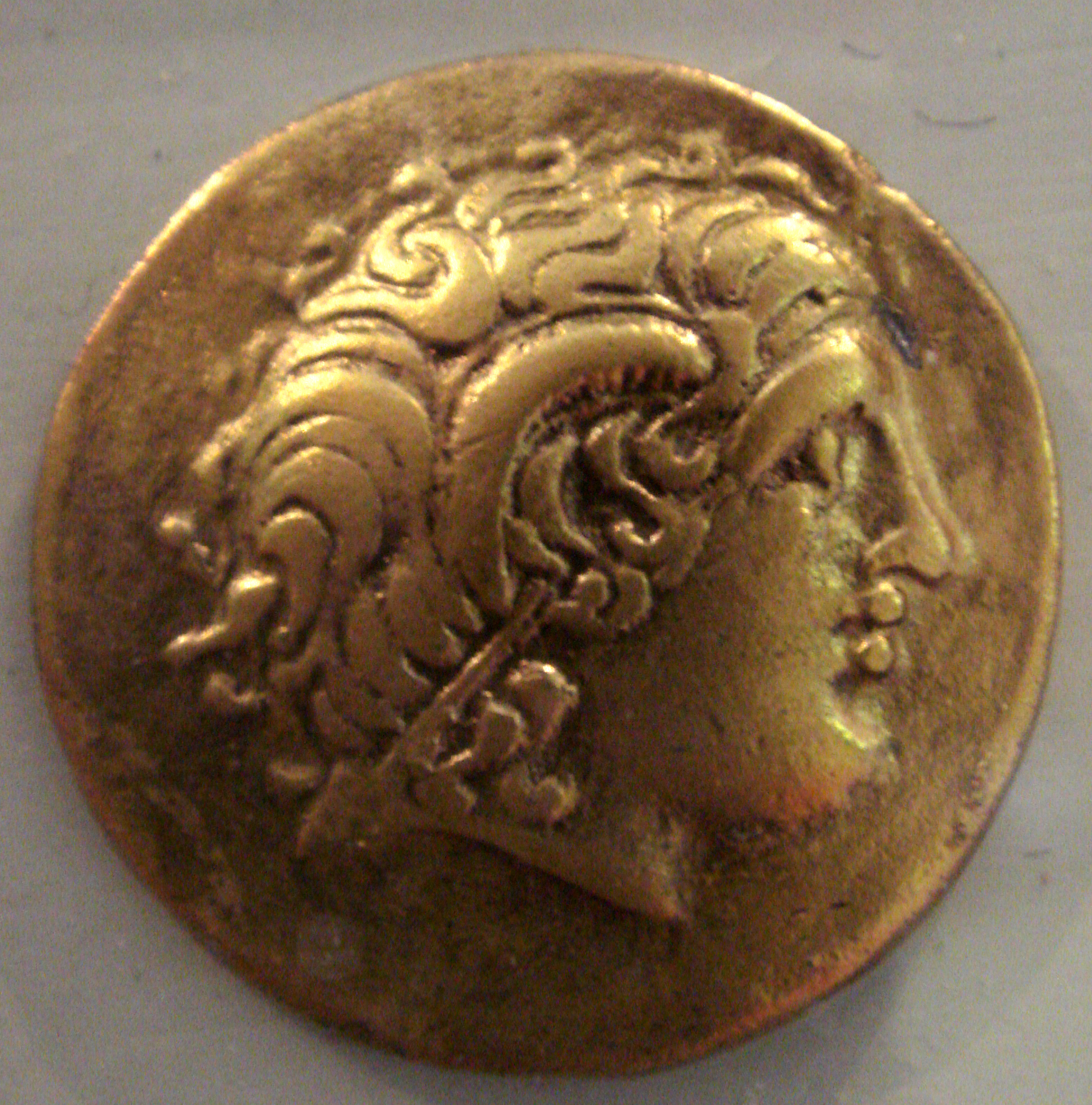
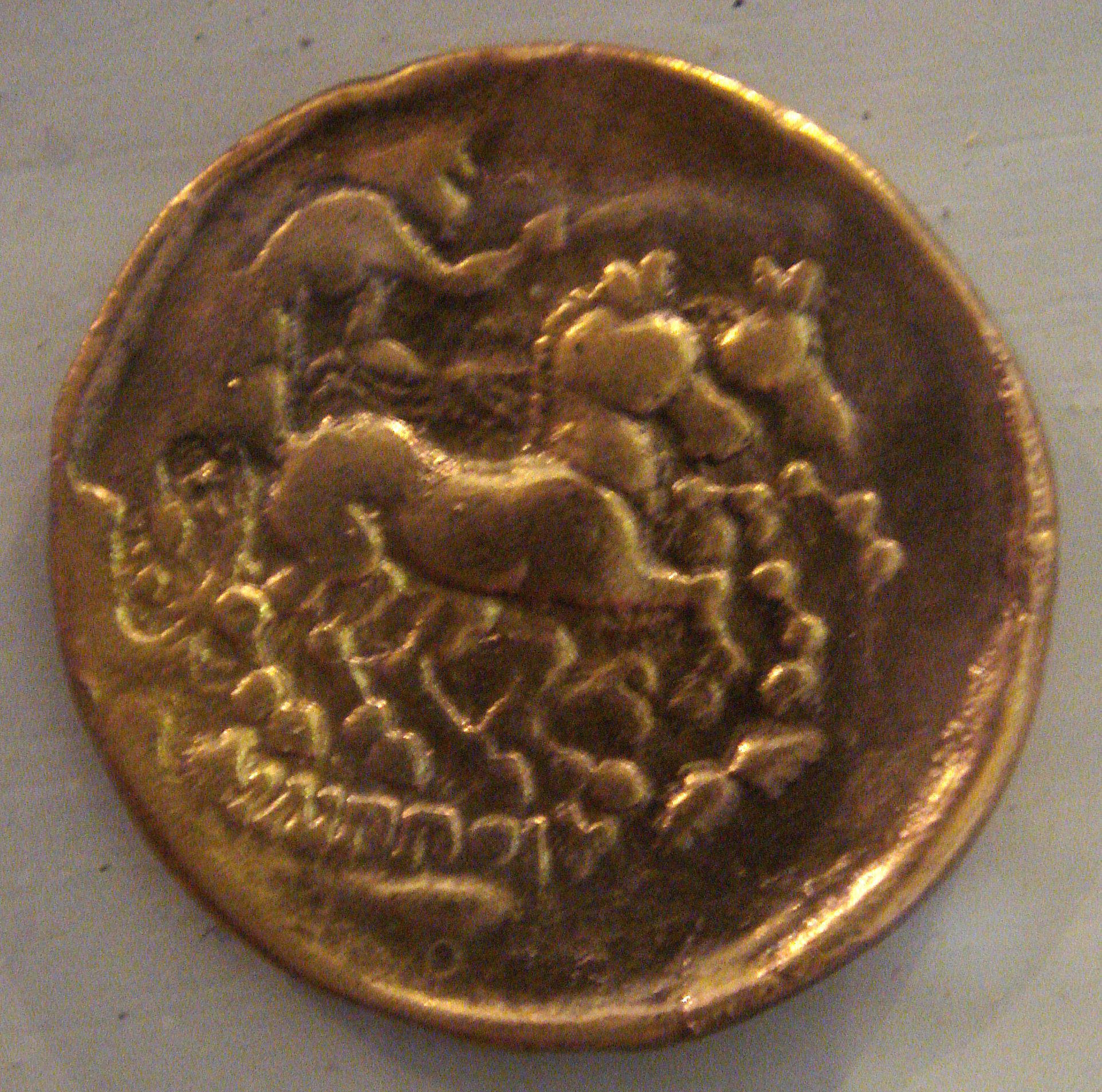
Gold coins of the Sequani Gauls, 5th–1st centuries BCE. Early Gaul coins were often inspired by Greek coinage.

The mother city of Phocaea would ultimately be destroyed by the Persians in 545 BCE, further reinforcing the exodus of the Phocaeans to their settlements of the Western Mediterranean. Populations intermixed, becoming half-Greek and half-indigenous. Trading links were extensive, in iron, spices, wheat and slaves, and with tin being imported to Marseille overland from Cornwall. The Greek settlements permitted cultural interaction between the Greeks and the Celts, and in particular helped develop an urban way of life in Celtic lands, contacts with sophisticated Greek methods, as well as regular East-West trade.

Overland trade with Celtic countries declined around 500 however, with the troubles following the end of the Halstatt civilization.

Location of Galatia in Anatolia.

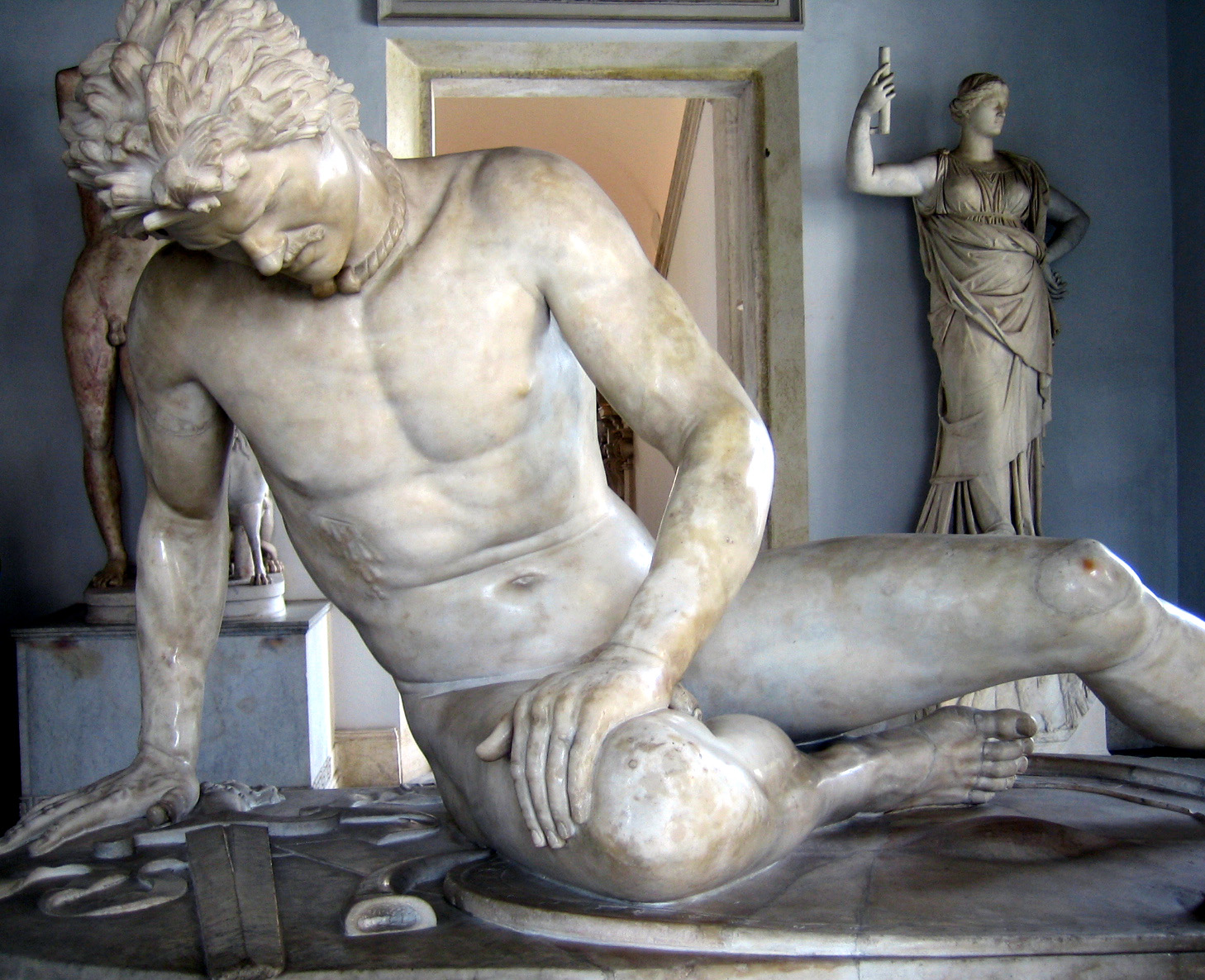
The Dying Gaul, an ancient Roman marble copy of a lost ancient Greek statue, thought to have been executed in bronze, commissioned some time between 230 and 220 BCE by Attalus I of Pergamon to honour his victory over the Galatians, also called Gallo-Graeci.

Because of demographic pressure, the Senones Gauls departed from Central France under Brennus to sack Rome in the Battle of the Allia c. 390 BCE. Expansion continued eastward, into the Aegean world, with a huge migration of Eastern Gauls appearing in Thrace, north of Greece, in 281 BCE in the Gallic invasion of the Balkans, favoured by the troubled rule of the Diadochi after Alexander the Great.

A part of the invasion crossed over to Anatolia and eventually settled in the area that came to be named after them, Galatia. The invaders, led by Leonnorius and Lutarius, came at the invitation of Nicomedes I of Bithynia, who required help in a dynastic struggle against his brother Zipoites II. Three tribes crossed over from Thrace to Asia Minor. They numbered about 10,000 fighting men and about the same number of women and children, divided into three tribes, Trocmi, Tolistobogii and Tectosages (from the area of Toulouse in southern France). They were eventually defeated by the Seleucid king Antiochus I, in a battle where the Seleucid war elephants shocked the Celts. While the momentum of the invasion was broken, the Galatians were by no means exterminated. Instead, the migration led to the establishment of a long-lived Celtic territory in central Anatolia, which included the eastern part of ancient Phrygia, a territory that became known as Galatia. There they ultimately settled, and being strengthened by fresh accessions of the same clan from Europe, they overran Bithynia and supported themselves by plundering neighbouring countries.

In 189 BCE Rome sent Gnaeus Manlius Vulso on an expedition against the Galatians. He defeated them. Galatia was henceforth dominated by Rome through regional rulers from 189 BCE onward.

Christianity, following its emergence in the Near-Eastern part of Asia, was traditionally introduced by Mary, Martha, Lazarus and some companions, who were expelled by persecutions from the Holy Land. They traversed the Mediterranean in a frail boat with neither rudder nor mast and landed at Saintes-Maries-de-la-Mer near Arles in 40 CE. Provençal tradition names Lazarus as the first bishop of Marseille, while Martha purportedly went on to tame a terrible beast in nearby Tarascon. Pilgrims visited their tombs at the abbey of Vézelay in Burgundy. In the Abbey of the Trinity at Vendôme, a phylactery was said to contain a tear shed by Jesus at the tomb of Lazarus. The cathedral of Autun, not far away, is dedicated to Lazarus as Saint Lazaire.

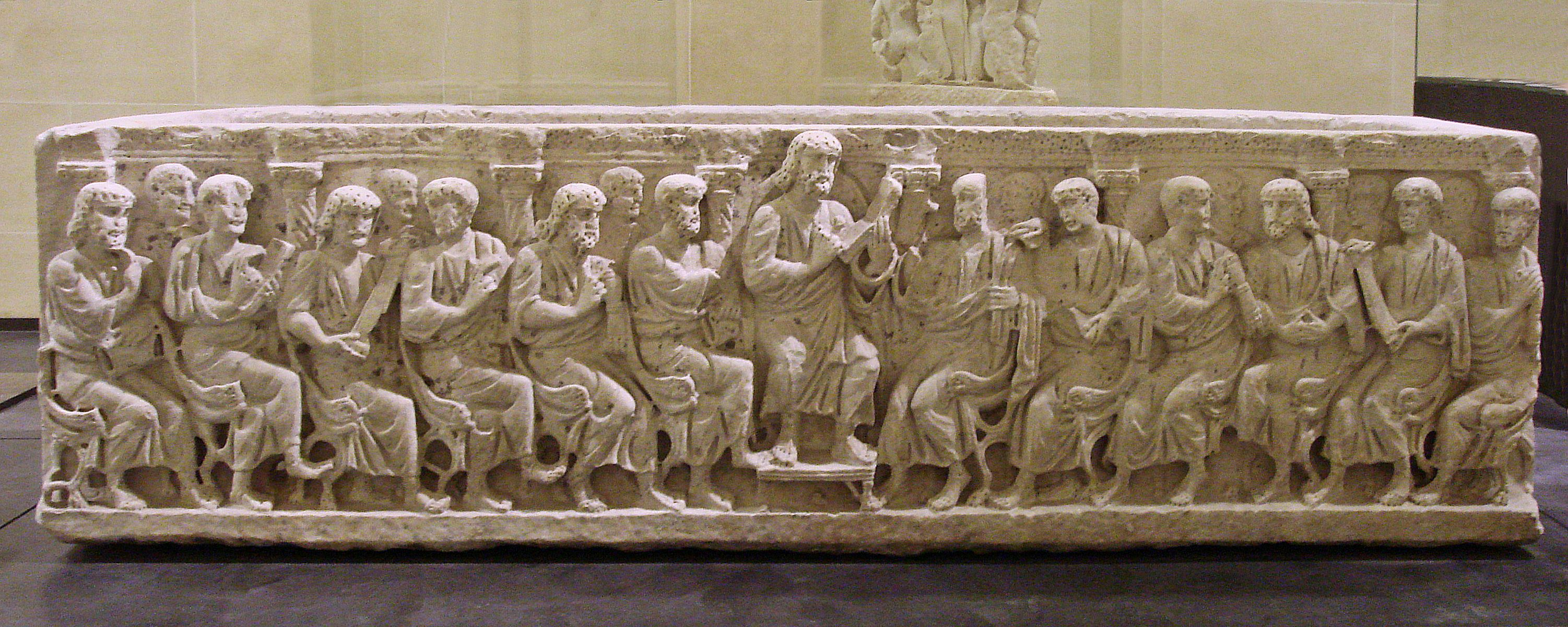
Gallo-Roman Christian sarcophagus, Rignieux-le-Franc (Ain), end of 4th century. Louvre Museum.

The first written records of Christians in France date from the 2nd century when Irenaeus detailed the deaths of ninety-year-old bishop Pothinus of Lugdunum (Lyon) and other martyrs of the 177 persecution in Lyon.

In 496 Remigius baptized Clovis I, who was converted from paganism to Catholicism. Clovis I, considered the founder of France, made himself the ally and protector of the papacy and his predominantly Catholic subjects.

In the beginning of the 5th century, various Asian nomadic tribes of Iranian origin, especially the Taifals and Sarmatians, were settled in Gaul by the Romans as coloni. They settled in the regions of Aquitaine and Poitou, which at one point was even called Thifalia or Theiphalia (Theofalgicus) in the 6th century, with remaining place names such as Tiffauges. Some Sarmatians had also been settled in the Rodez–Velay region.

From 414, Alans who had allied and then split with the Visigoths, entered into an agreement with the Romans which allowed them to settle in the area between Toulouse and the Mediterranean where they played a defensive role against the Visigoth in Spain.

The Roman general Aetius settled Alans in Gaul for military purposes, first in the region of Valence in 440 to control the lower Isère valley, and in 442 in the area around Orléans, apparently to counter the Armorican Bacaudae. Some cities have been named after them, such as Allaines or Allainville.

The general path of the Hun forces in the invasion of Gaul

In 450 Attila proclaimed his intent to attack the powerful Visigoth kingdom of Toulouse, making an alliance with Emperor Valentinian III in order to do so. Attila gathered his vassals—Gepids, Ostrogoths, Rugians, Scirians, Heruls, Thuringians, Alans, Burgundians, among others and began his march west. In 451 he arrived in Belgica with an army exaggerated by Jordanes to half a million strong. J.B. Bury believes that Attila's intent, by the time he marched west, was to extend his kingdom – already the strongest on the continent – across Gaul to the Atlantic Ocean. On 7 April, Attila captured Metz. Saint Genevieve is believed to have saved Paris.

The Romans under Aëtius allied with troops from among the Franks, the Burgundians, the Celts, the Goths and the Alans and finally stopped the advancing Huns in the Battle of Châlons.

== Middle Ages ==
=== Exchanges with the Arab world (8th–13th centuries) ===
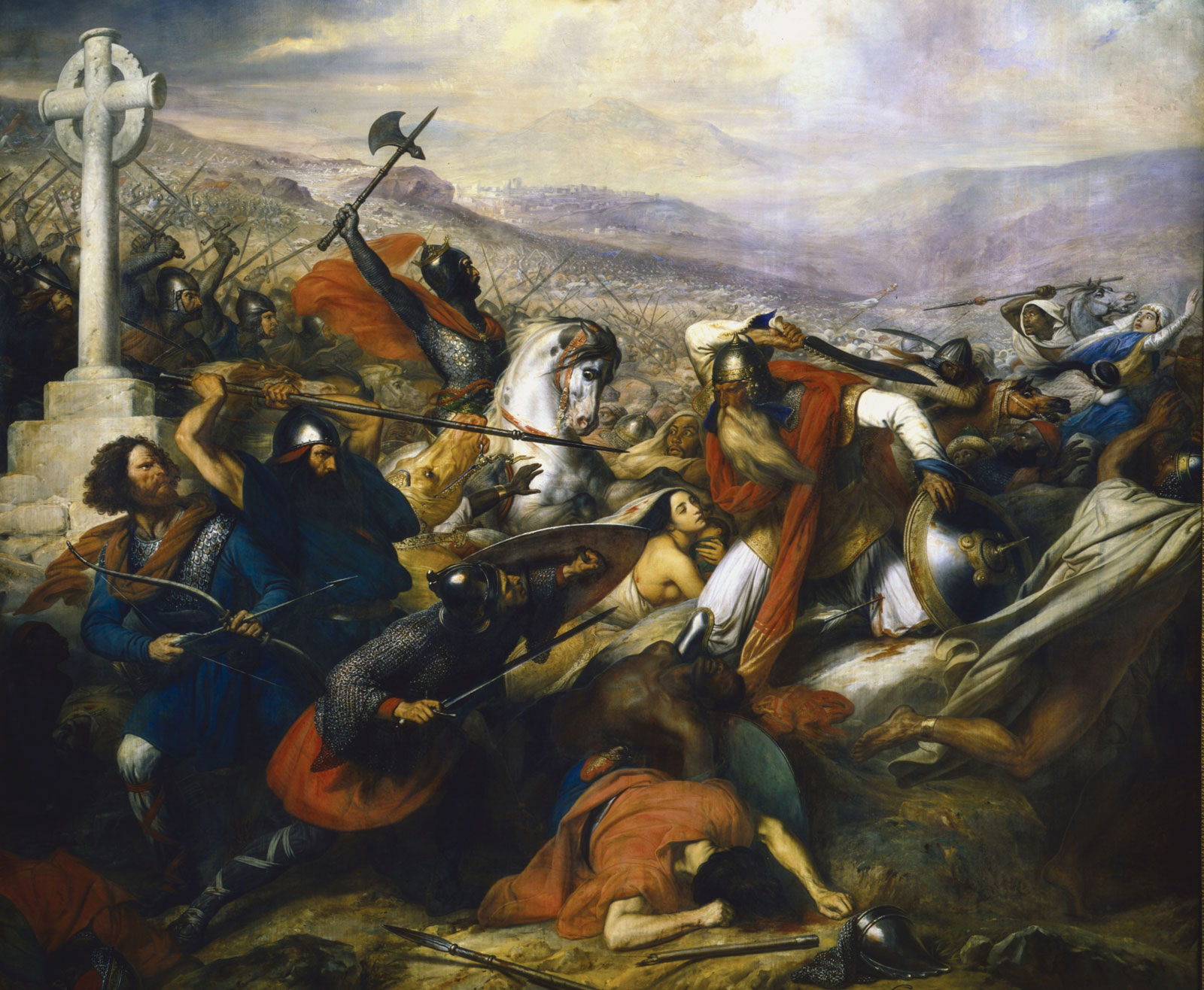
Charles Martel (mounted) facing ‘Abdul Rahman Al Ghafiqi (right) at the Battle of Poitiers

Following the rise of Islam in the Arabian Peninsula in the 7th century, the Arabs invaded northern Africa, then the Iberian Peninsula and France. They were finally repelled at the Battle of Poitiers in 732, but thereafter remained a significant presence in southern France and Spain.

Various exchanges are known around that time, as when Arculf, a Frankish Bishop, visited the Holy Land in the 670s.

=== Abbasid-Carolingian alliance ===
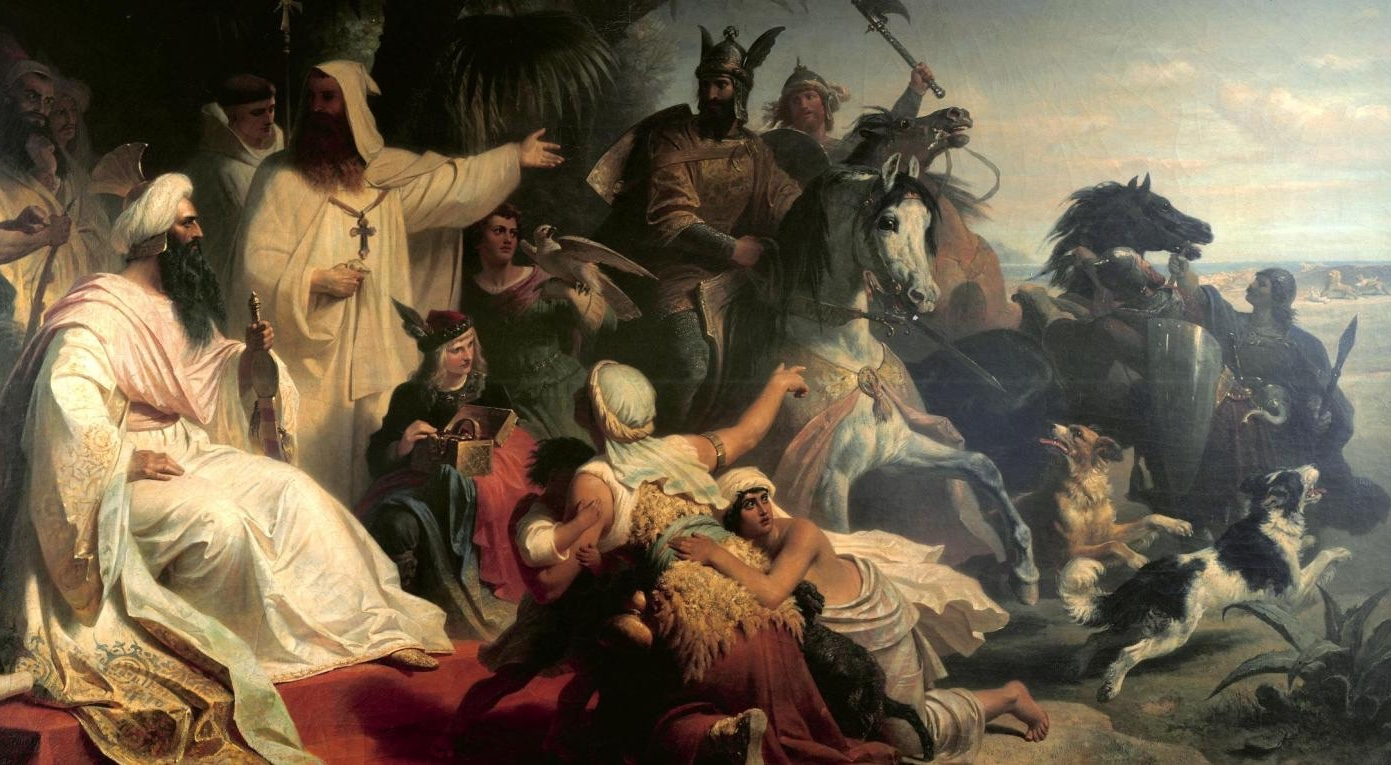
Harun al-Rashid receiving a delegation of Charlemagne in Baghdad, by Julius Köckert

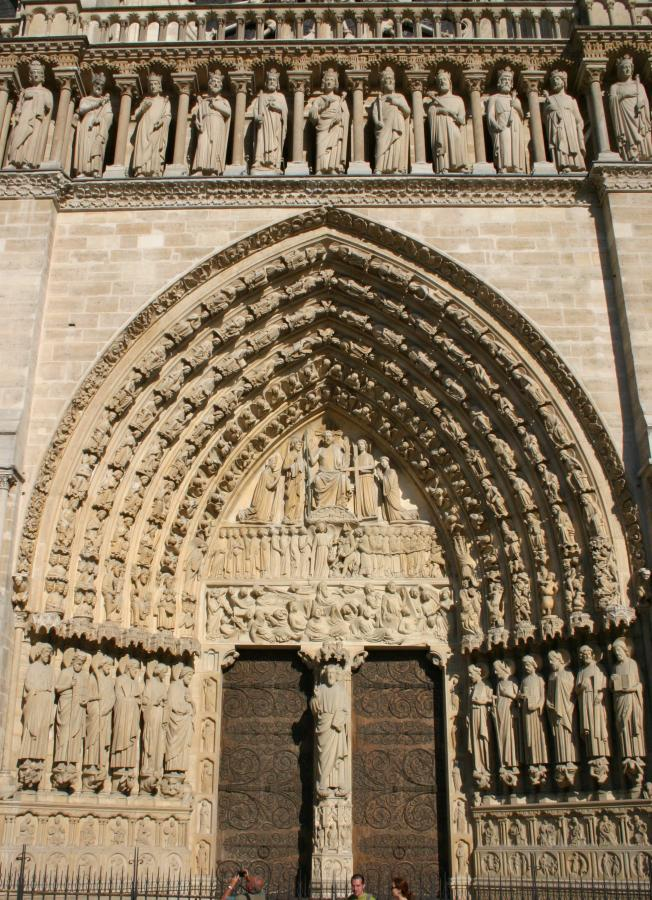
The pointed arch, an example of Islamic influences on Christian art

An Abbasid-Carolingian alliance was attempted and partially formed during the 8th to 9th century through a series of embassies, rapprochements and combined military operations between the Frankish Carolingian Empire and the Abbasid Caliphate or the pro-Abbasid Muslim rulers in Spain.

These contacts followed an intense conflict between the Carolingians and the Umayyads, marked by the landslide Battle of Tours in 732, and were aimed at establishing a counter–alliance with the distant Abbasid Empire. There were numerous embassies between Charlemagne and the Abbasid caliph Harun al-Rashid from 797, apparently in view of a Carolingian-Abbasid alliance against Byzantium, or with a view to gaining an alliance against the Umayyads of Spain.

=== Cultural and scientific exchanges ===
From the 10th to the 13th century, Islamic contributions to Medieval Europe, including France, were numerous, affecting such varied areas as art, architecture, medicine, agriculture, music, language, education, law, and technology. Over several centuries Europe absorbed knowledge from the Islamic civilization, but also knowledge from India or lost knowledge from the ancient Greeks which was being retransmitted by the Arabs. The French scientist Gerbert of Aurillac, future Pope Sylvester II, who had spent some time in Catalonia in the 960s, was instrumental in the adoption of Arabic numerals, as well as the abacus in France and Christian Europe.

== France and the Near East (16th–19th centuries) ==
Between the 16th and 19th century, France had at times a relatively dormant relation with the Near East (or Western Asia), while at other times was closely politically intertwined. Relations with the region were mostly dominated through the two empires that ruled the area, namely the rivaling Ottoman Empire, and the various Persian dynasties between these centuries (Safavids, Afsharids, and Qajars). The rivalry between the French, British, and Russians was a key factor in foreign policies for the French for the region, finding themselves at times allied with the Turks or Persians.

=== Franco-Ottoman alliance (16th–18th centuries) ===
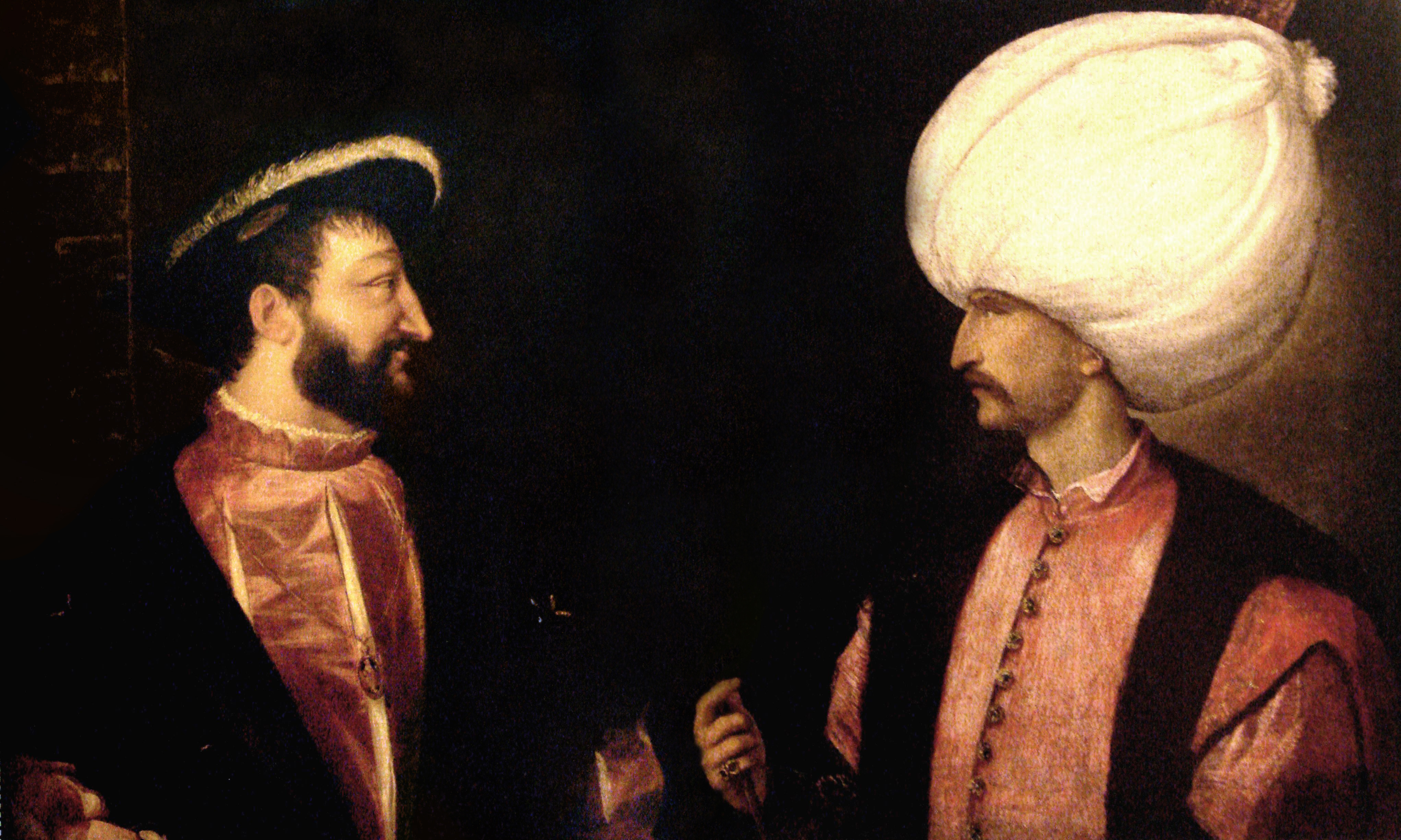
Francis I (left) and Suleiman the Magnificent (right) initiated a Franco-Ottoman alliance from the 1530s.

Under the reign of Francis I, France became the first country in Europe to establish formal relations with the Ottoman Empire, and to set up instruction in the Arabic language, through the instruction of Guillaume Postel at the Collège de France.

A Franco-Ottoman alliance was established in 1536 between the king of France Francis I and the Turkish ruler of the Ottoman Empire Suleiman the Magnificent following the critical setbacks which Francis had encountered in Europe against Charles V. The alliance has been called "the first nonideological diplomatic alliance of its kind between a Christian and non-Christian empire". It caused a scandal in the Christian world, and was designated as "the impious alliance", or "the sacrilegious union of the Lily and the Crescent"; nevertheless, it endured since it served the objective interests of both parties.

The French forces, led by François de Bourbon and the Ottoman forces, led by Barbarossa, joined at Marseille in August 1543, and collaborated to bombard the city of Nice in the Siege of Nice. In this action 110 Ottoman galleys, amounting to 30,000 men, combined with 50 French galleys. The Franco-Ottomans laid waste to the city, but met a stiff resistance which gave rise to the story of Catherine Ségurane. Afterwards, Francis allowed the Ottomans to winter at Toulon.

The strategic and sometimes tactical alliance lasted for about three centuries, until the Napoleonic Campaign in Egypt, an Ottoman territory, in 1798–1801.

=== French diplomacy with Persia (16th–19th centuries) ===
The advent of Shah Ismail I in 1501 coincided with crucial world events. Becoming the eventual archrival of the Ottomans, the shah sought, unsuccessfully, to establish a precarious alliance against the Ottomans together with the Portuguese, Emperor Charles V, and King Ludvig II of Hungary. Whereas other European governments repeatedly insisted on their avowed desire to cooperate with Persia against the Turks, France remained aloof due to the treaty of 1536 between Francis I and Suleiman the Magnificent. When Suleiman I invaded north-west Persia and took Tabriz during the Ottoman-Safavid War (1532-1555), he was accompanied by the French ambassador Gabriel de Luetz, whose advice enabled the Ottomans to force the Persians to surrender the citadel of Van.

When the tide turned in 1604 as Persia gained the upper hand against Ottonan Turkey, the French ambassador to the Porte, Savary de Brèves, wrote a memoir on how an alliance with Persian would be detrimental to Franco–Ottoman relations. Thus, the Turkish alliance prevented Henri IV from responding to the overtures made to him by shah Abbas I, who was rapidly reconquering lost territories and conquering beyond that in Anatolia and the Caucasus.

French endeavors in the Near East remained cautious and limited even after the fall of the Safavids. However, France played an important part in post-Safavid external policies through Marquis de Bonnac, ambassador to the Porte, and who was an active mediator between Russia, Iran, and Turkey, all regional rivals. Cultural links between France and Persia, although gradually developing through this period, suffered at times because of ruptures in diplomatic commercial relations. However, relations picked up intensely with the advent of Napoleon and the Qajar dynasty in Persia.

==== Franco-Persian alliance (19th century) ====
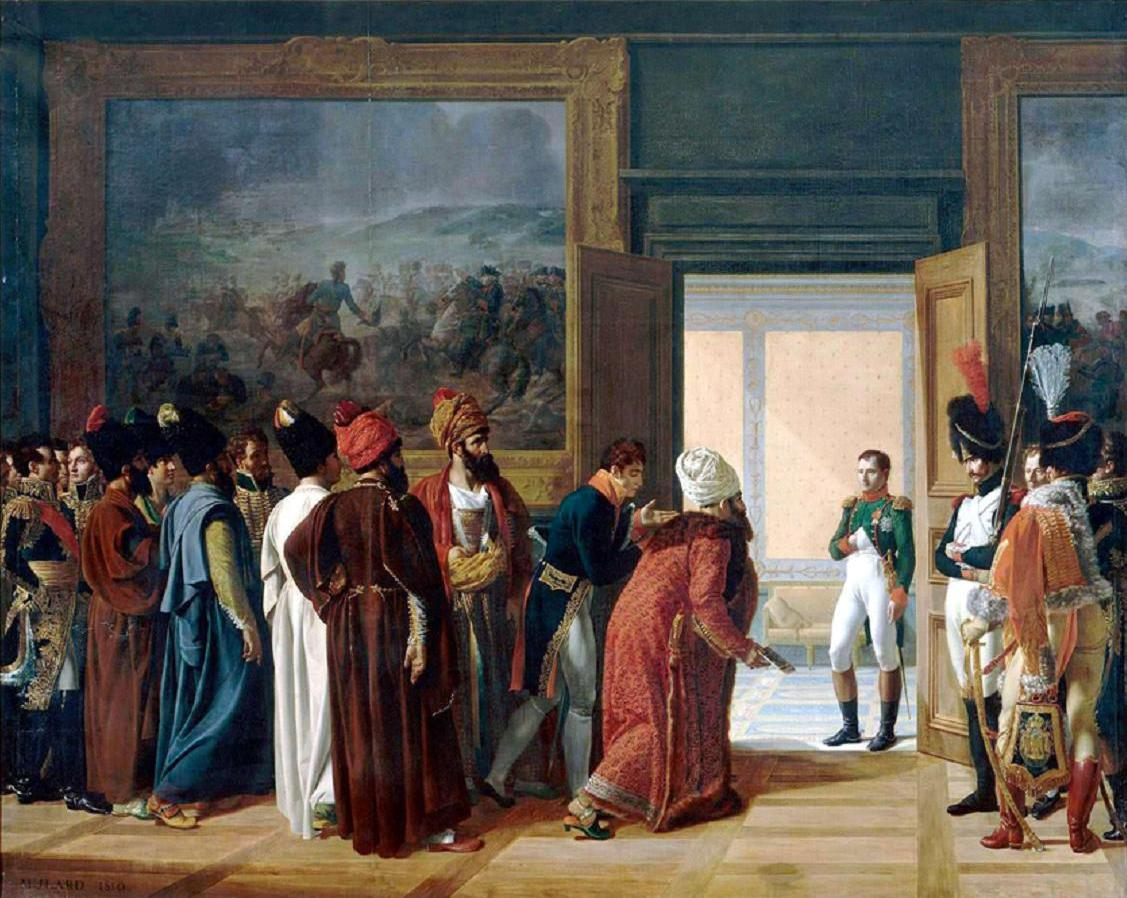
The Persian Envoy Mirza Mohammad-Reza Qazvini meeting with Napoleon I at the Finckenstein Palace, 27 Avril 1807, for the signature of the Treaty of Finckenstein, a Franco-Persian alliance

Despite the hostility of Russian Empress Catherine the Great towards both neighbouring rival Persia and the French Revolution, the ascendancy of the new monarchy in Persia represented by the Qajar dynasty did not at once led to closer relations between the two, except for the scientific mission of the physicians Jean-Guillaume Bruguières and Guillaume-Antoine Olivier. However, things changed in 1804 when Fath-Ali Shah Qajar asked Napoleon to help him recover Georgia, which had been ruled by Persia for centuries and was part of its integral domains, but had been invaded and annexed by Imperial Russia. Napoleon thought that closer ties with Persia might facilitate the defeat of Russia and open the way to India as well.

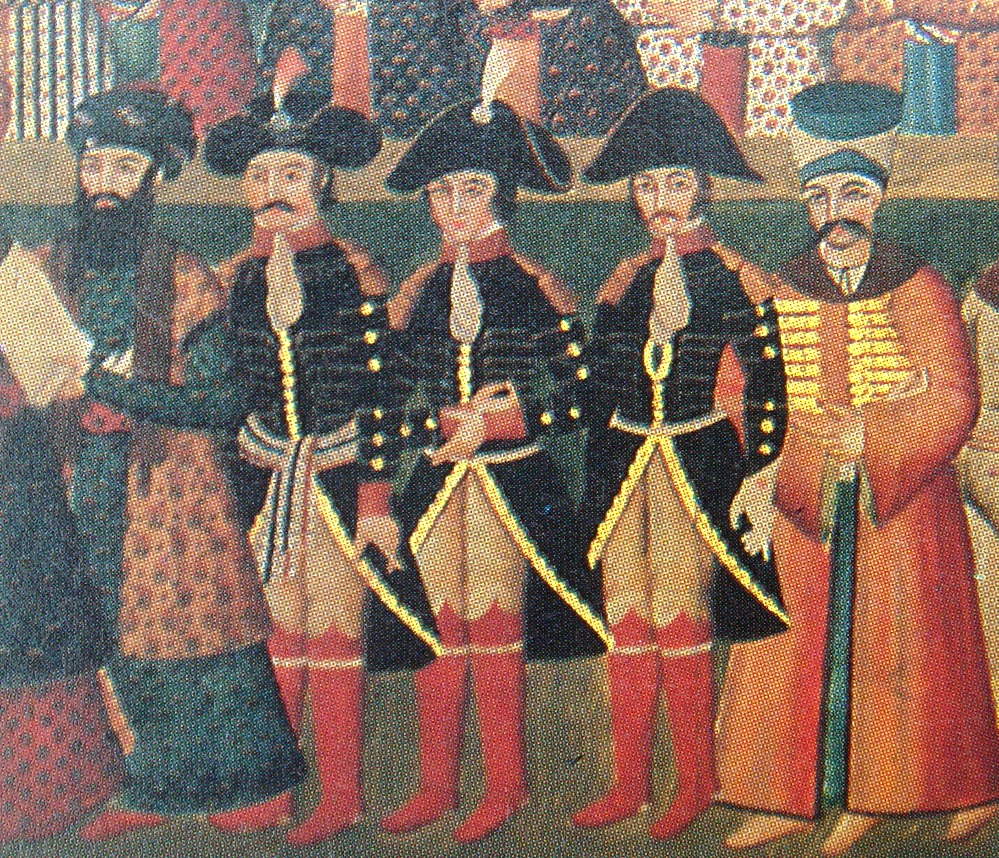
General Gardane, with colleagues Jaubert and Joanin, at the Persian court of Fath Ali Shah in 1808

Following his victory at Austerlitz in 1805, Napoleon managed to establish the short-lived Franco-Ottoman alliance and a Franco-Persian alliance formalized in the Treaty of Finckenstein in 1807, while Persia and Russia were already for three years in the Russo-Persian War (1804-1813), in order to obtain strategic support in his fight against the Russian Empire.

The treaty included French support for Persia to reclaim its lost territories comprising Georgia and other territories in the Caucasus that were occupied by Russia by that time, promising to act so that Russia would surrender the territory. In exchange, Persia was to fight Great Britain, and allow France to cross the Persian territory to eventually reach India.

Changes in the political atmosphere that marked the peace between France and Russia at the Treaty of Tilsit made the alliance lose its motivation. The ongoing Russo-Persian War (1804-1813) despite several successes partly influenced due to initial French assistance, resulted eventually in combination with the Treaty of Tilsit in a disaster for Persia, as not only was it forced to recognize Russian suzerainty over Georgia, its own land which it had been ruling for centuries, but it also facilitated the cession of Dagestan and most of what is today Azerbaijan to Russia amongst the other terms of the Treaty of Gulistan.

=== French plans in Egypt ===
Napoleon attempted to establish a decisive French presence in Asia, by first launching the French invasion of Egypt and Syria in 1798. He wished to establish a French presence in the Middle East, and was then planning to make a junction with Tipu Sahib in India against the British. Napoleon assured the French Directory that "as soon as he had conquered Egypt, he will establish relations with the Indian princes and, together with them, attack the English in their possessions." According to a 13 February 1798 report by Talleyrand, "Having occupied and fortified Egypt, we shall send a force of 15,000 men from Suez to India, to join the forces of Tipu-Sahib and drive away the English." The Directory, though troubled by the scope and cost of the enterprise, agreed so the popular general would be absent from the centre of power.

== Commercial, religious and military expansion (16th–18th century) ==
=== Early-modern contacts with East-Asia (1527-) ===
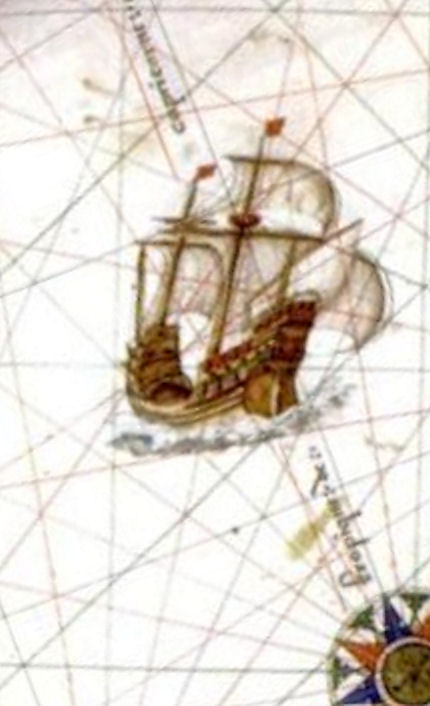
Sailing ship near Java la Grande in Vallard Atlas 1547, Dieppe school

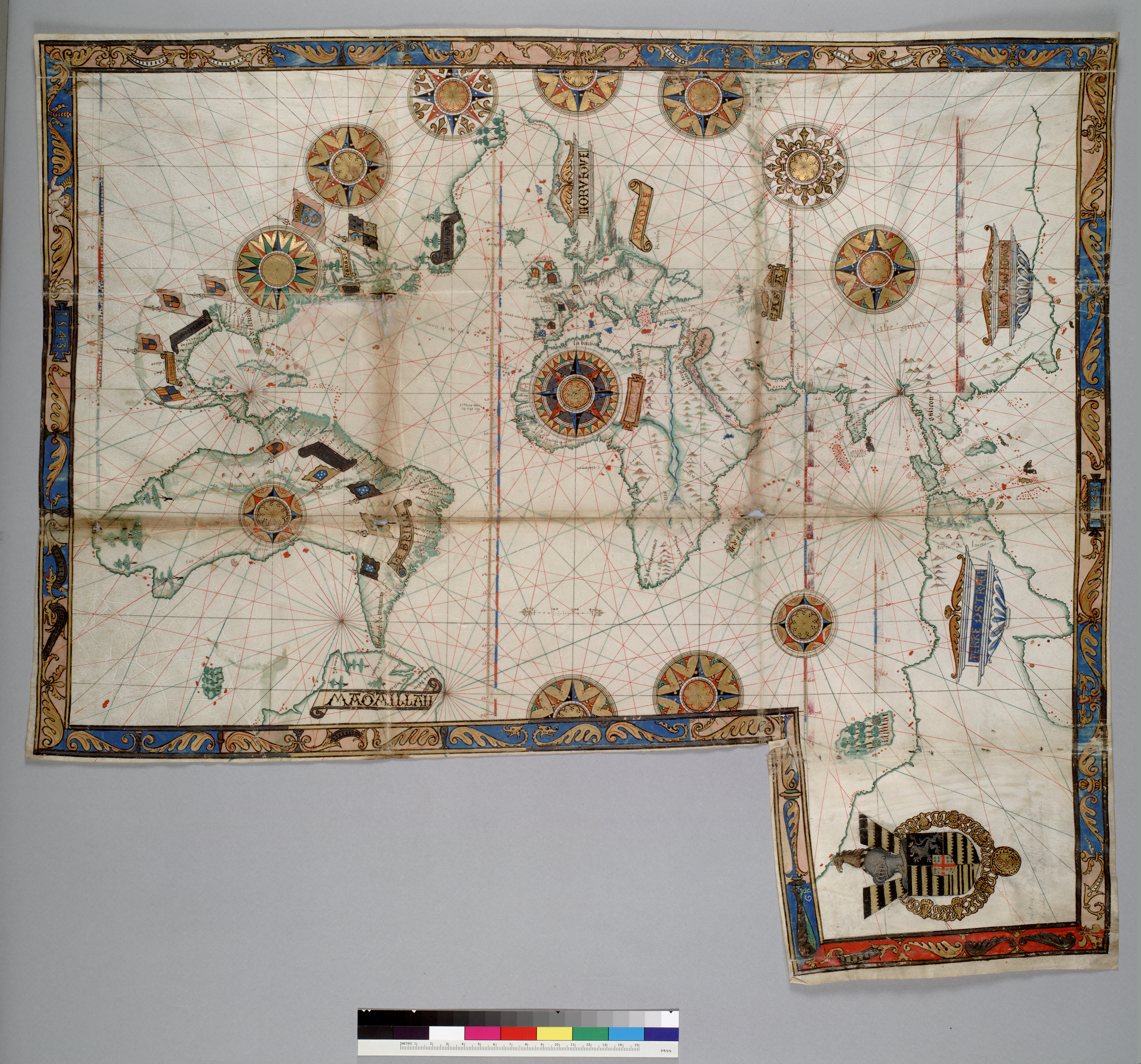
Example of Dieppe maps, by Guillaume Brouscon, 1543

France began trading with Eastern Asia from the early 16th century. In 1526, a sailor from Honfleur named Pierre Caunay sailed to Sumatra. He lost his ship on the return leg between Africa and Madagascar, where the crew was imprisoned by the Portuguese. In July 1527, a French Norman trading ship from Rouen is recorded by the Portuguese João de Barros to have arrived in the Indian city of Diu. The next year, a ship under Jean de Breuilly also arrived in Diu, but this time was seized by the Portuguese.

In 1529, Jean Parmentier, sailing with the Sacre and the Pensée, reached Sumatra. Upon its return, the expedition triggered the development of the Dieppe maps, influencing the work of Dieppe cartographers, such as Jean Rotz.

Following the Portuguese and Spanish forays into Asia after 1500, a few Frenchmen participated in the activities of Catholic religious orders in these countries during the 16th century. The first instance of France-Thailand relations occurred according to the Jesuit Giovanni Pietro Maffei when about 1550 a French Franciscan, Bonferre, hearing of the great kingdom of the Peguans and the Siamese in the East, went on a Portuguese ship from Goa to Cosme (Pegu), where for three years he preached the Gospel, but without any result.

==== François Pyrard and François Martin (1601–1611) ====
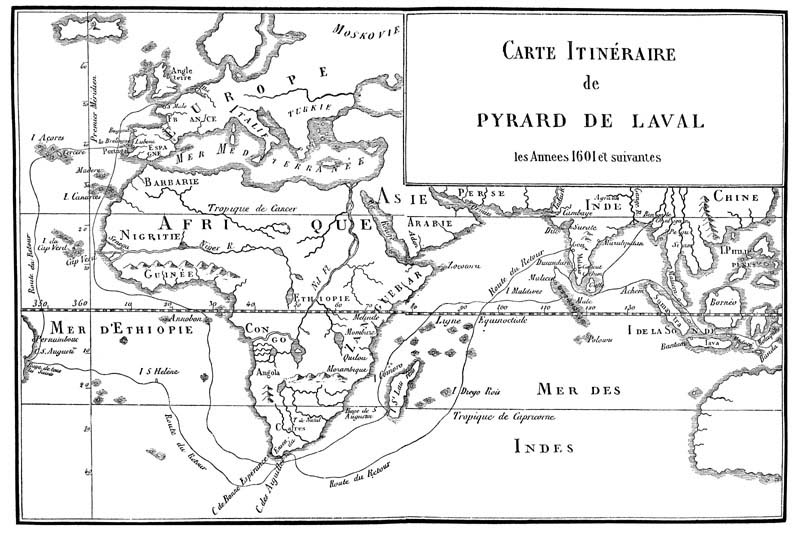
Itinerary of François Pyrard de Laval (1601—1611)

In December 1600 a company was formed through the association of Saint-Malo, Laval and Vitré, to trade with the Moluccas and Japan. Two ships, the Croissant and the Corbin, were sent around the Cape in May 1601. One was wrecked in the Maldives, leading to the adventure of François Pyrard de Laval who managed to return to France in 1611. The second ship, carrying François Martin de Vitré, reached Ceylon and traded with Acheh in Sumatra, but was captured by the Dutch on the return leg at Cape Finisterre. François Martin de Vitré was the first Frenchman to write an account of travels to the Far East in 1604, at the request of Henry IV, and from that time numerous accounts on Asia were published.

From 1604 to 1609, following the return of François Martin de Vitré, Henry IV developed a strong enthusiasm for commerce with Asia, and attempted to set up a French East India Company on the model of England and the Netherlands. On 1 June 1604, he issued letter patents to Dieppe merchants to form the first French East Indies Company, giving them exclusive rights to Asian trade for 15 years, but no ships were actually sent. In 1606, Henri de Feynes left for China, which he became the first Frenchman to visit. On 1609, another adventurer, Pierre-Olivier Malherbe returned from a circumnavigation, and informed Henry IV of his adventures. He visited China, and in India had an encounter with Akbar.

On the missionary front, Nicolas Trigault resumed France-China relations when he left Europe to do missionary work in Asia around 1610, eventually arriving at Nanjing, China in 1611.

==== Hasekura Tsunenaga (1615) ====
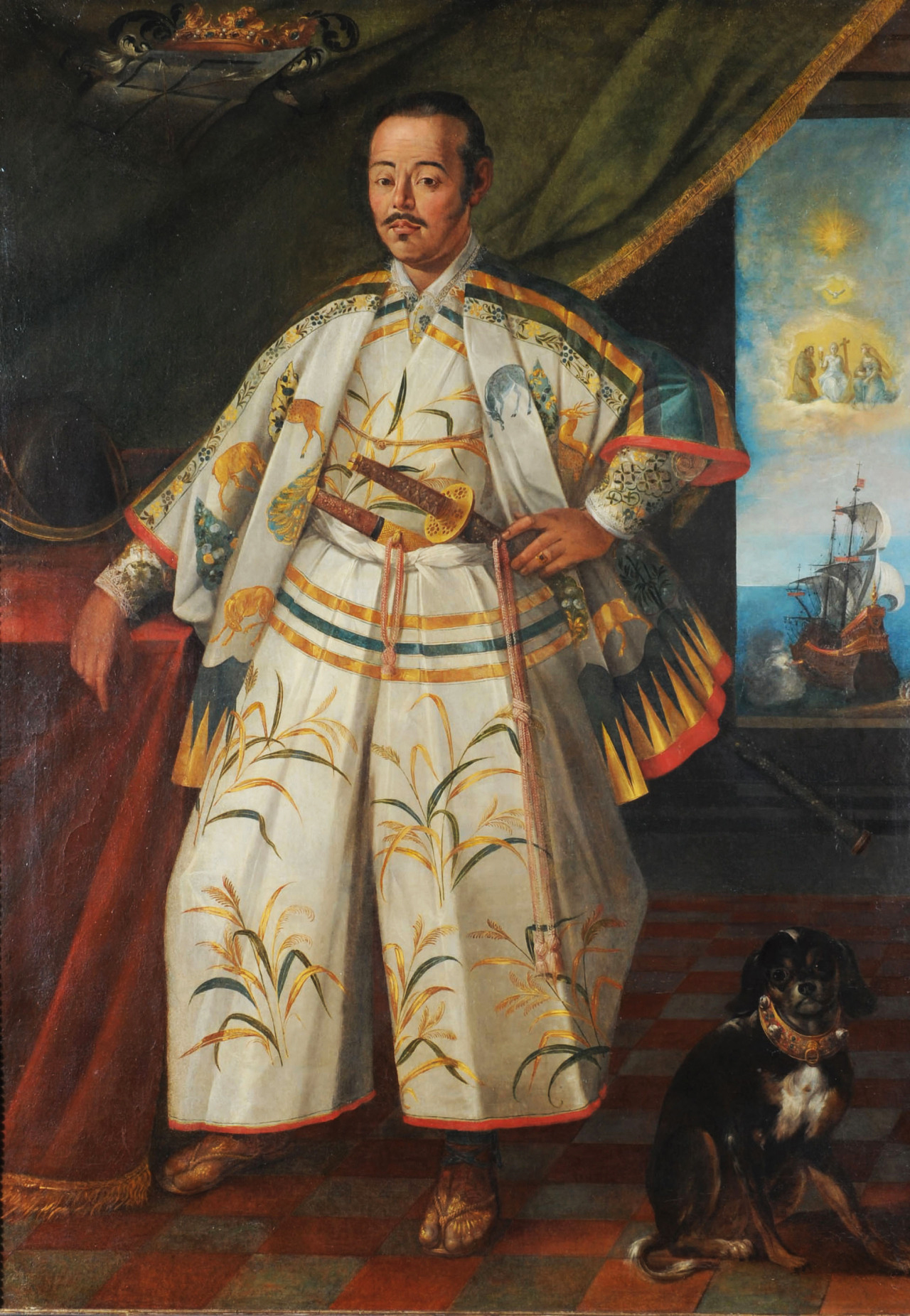
Hasekura Tsunenaga initiated France-Japan relations when he landed in Saint-Tropez in 1615.

France-Japan relations started in 1615 when Hasekura Tsunenaga, a Japanese samurai and ambassador, sent to Rome by Date Masamune, landed at Saint-Tropez for a few days. In 1636, Guillaume Courtet, a French Dominican priest, would reciprocate when he set foot in Japan. He penetrated into Japan clandestinely, against the 1613 interdiction of Christianity. He was caught, tortured, and died in Nagasaki on 29 September 1637.

==== Company of the Moluccas (1615) ====
In 1615, the regent Marie de Médicis incorporated the merchants of Dieppe and other harbours to found the Company of the Moluccas. In 1616, two expeditions were Asia–bound from Honfleur in Normandy: three ships left for India, and two ships for Bantam. One ship returned from Bantam in 1617 with a small cargo, and letters from the Dutch expressing their hostility towards French ships in the East Indies. Also in 1616, two ships were sent from Saint-Malo to Java. One was captured by the Dutch, but the other obtained an agreement from the ruler of Pondicherry to build a fortress and a factory there, and returned with a rich cargo.

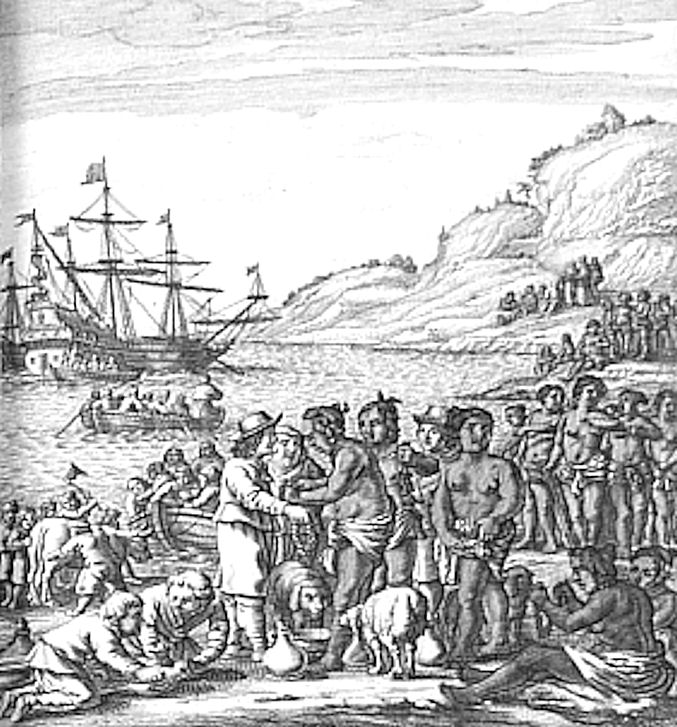
"Fleet of Montmorency", led by Augustin de Beaulieu, in the East Indies (1619—1622)

In 1619, an armed expedition composed of three ships (275 crew, 106 cannons) called the "Fleet of Montmorency" under General Augustin de Beaulieu was sent from Honfleur, to fight the Dutch in the Far East. They encountered the Dutch fleet off Sumatra. One ship was captured, another remained in Asia for inter-country trade, and the third returned to Le Havre in 1622. In 1624, with the Treaty of Compiègne, Richelieu obtained that the Dutch would stop fighting the French in the East. Isaac de Razilly commented however:

As regards Asia and the East Indies there is no hope of planting colonies, for the way is too long, and the Spaniards and Dutch are too strong to suffer it.

— Isaac de Razilly, 1625.

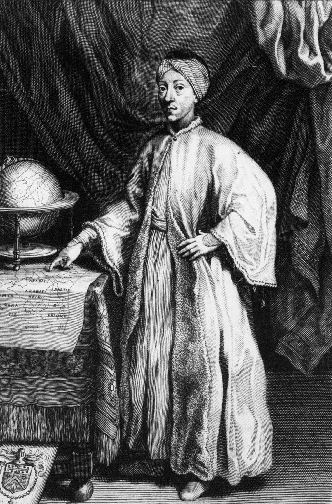
Jean de Thévenot, from "Relation d'un voyage fait au Levant" (1664)

However, trade further developed, with the activities of people such as Jean de Thévenot and Jean-Baptiste Tavernier in 17th century Asia. Gilles de Régimont travelled to Persia and India in 1630 and returned in 1632 with a rich cargo. He formed a trading company at Dieppe in 1633, and sent ships every year to the Indian Ocean.

In 1638, the Honfleur sailor Pierre Berthelot, after becoming a Carmelite in Goa in the mission of Francis Xavier, was martyred in Aceh.

=== Expansion under Louis XIV ===
France adopted a more structured approach to its expansion in Asia during the 17th century during the rule of Louis XIV, in an organized attempt to establish a mercantile empire by taking a share of the lucrative market of the Indian Ocean. On the religious plane, the Paris Foreign Missions Society was formed from 1658 in order to provide for missionary work in Asia mainly, under French control. Soon after, the French East India Company was established in 1664.

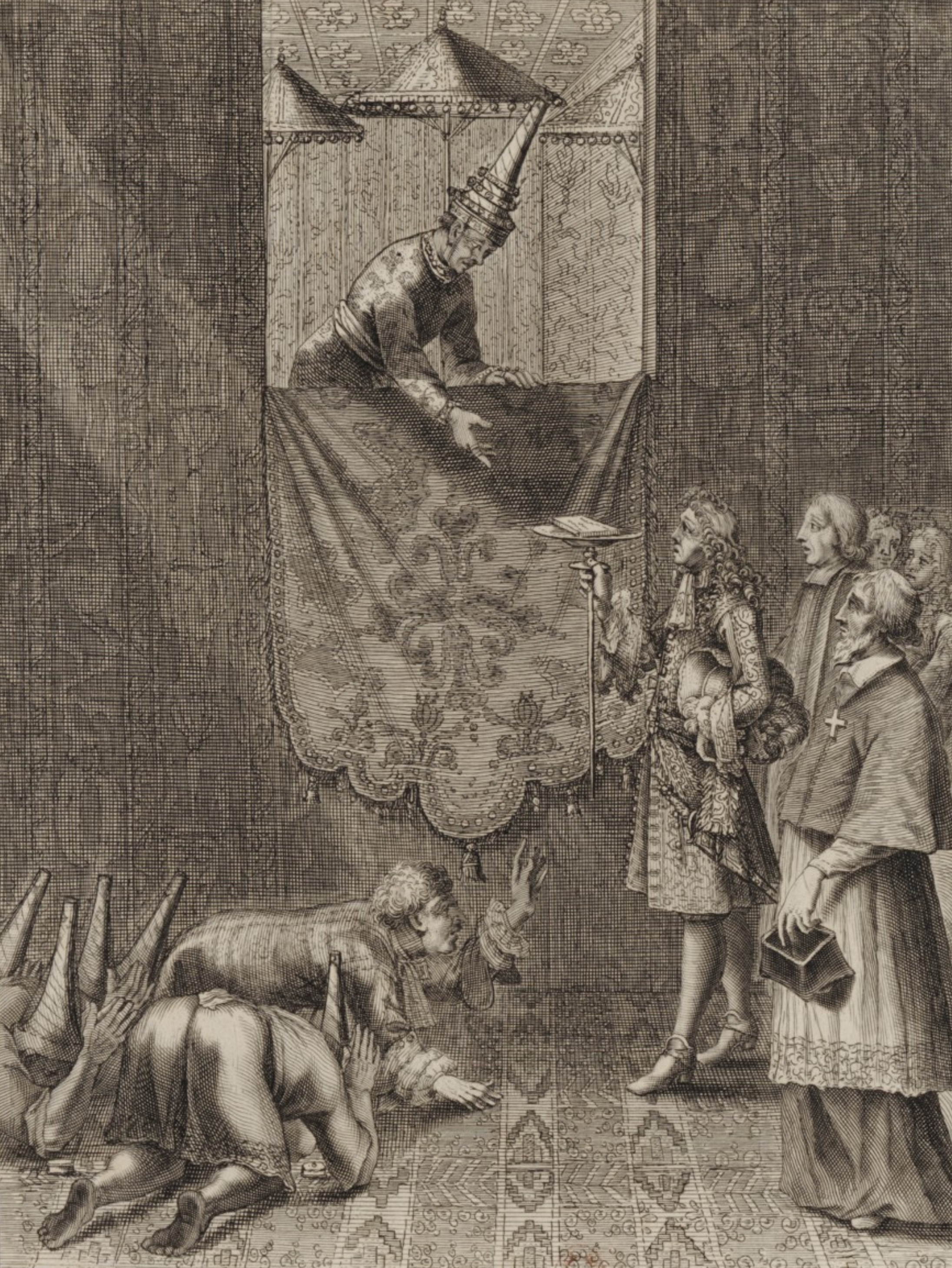
Chevalier de Chaumont presents a letter from Louis XIV to King Narai in 1685.

In 1664 a mission was sent to Madagascar under François Caron, formerly in the service of the Dutch East India Company. The Madagascar mission failed, but soon after, Caron succeeded in founding French outposts at Surat (1668) and at Masulipatam (1669) in India;. Caron became "Commissaire" at Pondicherry (1668—1672). The French East India Company set up a trading centre at Pondicherry in 1673. This outpost eventually became the chief French settlement in India.

In 1672, Caron helped lead French forces in Ceylon, where the strategic bay at Trincomalee was captured and St. Thomé (also known as Meilâpûr) on the Coromandel coast was also taken. However, his military success was short-lived. The French were driven out while Caron was en route to Europe in 1673.

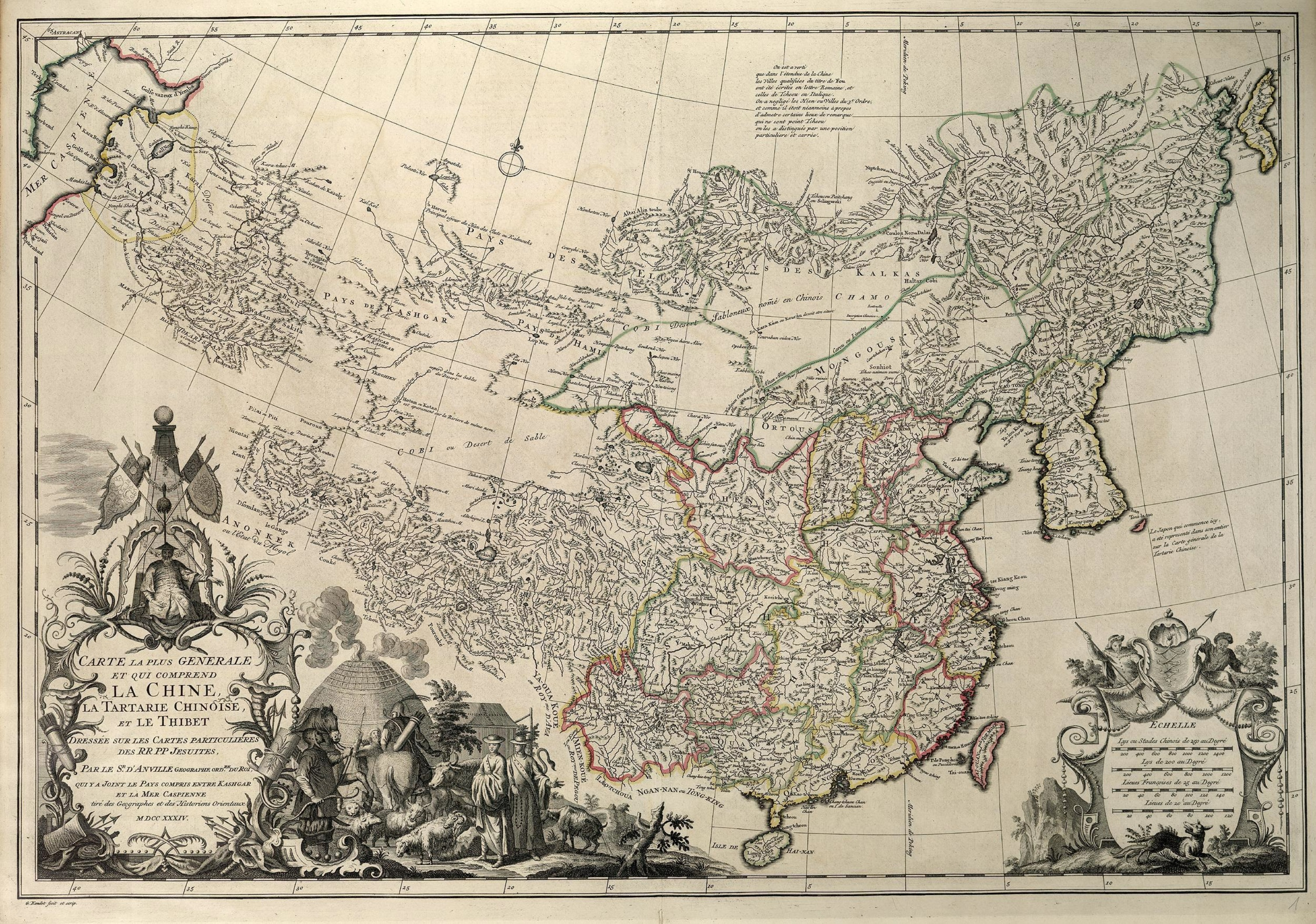
D'Anville's map of China and Central Asia (1734), compiled on the basis of the first systematic geographic survey of the entire Chinese Empire by a team of French Jesuits (c. 1700)

During the reign of Louis XIV, France further developed France–Thailand relations and sent numerous embassies to Siam, led by Chevalier de Chaumont in 1685 and later by Simon de la Loubère in 1687, until French troops were ousted from the country following the 1688 Siege of Bangkok. Around the same time France actively participated in the Jesuit China missions, as Louis XIV sent in 1685 a mission of five Jesuits "mathematicians" to China in an attempt to break the Portuguese predominance: Jean de Fontaney (1643–1710), Joachim Bouvet (1656–1730), Jean-François Gerbillon (1654–1707), Louis Le Comte (1655–1728) and Claude de Visdelou (1656–1737). While French Jesuits were found at the court of the Manchu Kangxi Emperor in China, Louis received the visit of a Chinese Jesuit, Michael Shen Fu-Tsung, by 1684. Furthermore, several years later, he had at his court a Chinese librarian and translator — Arcadio Huang.

=== Louis XV/ Louis XVI ===
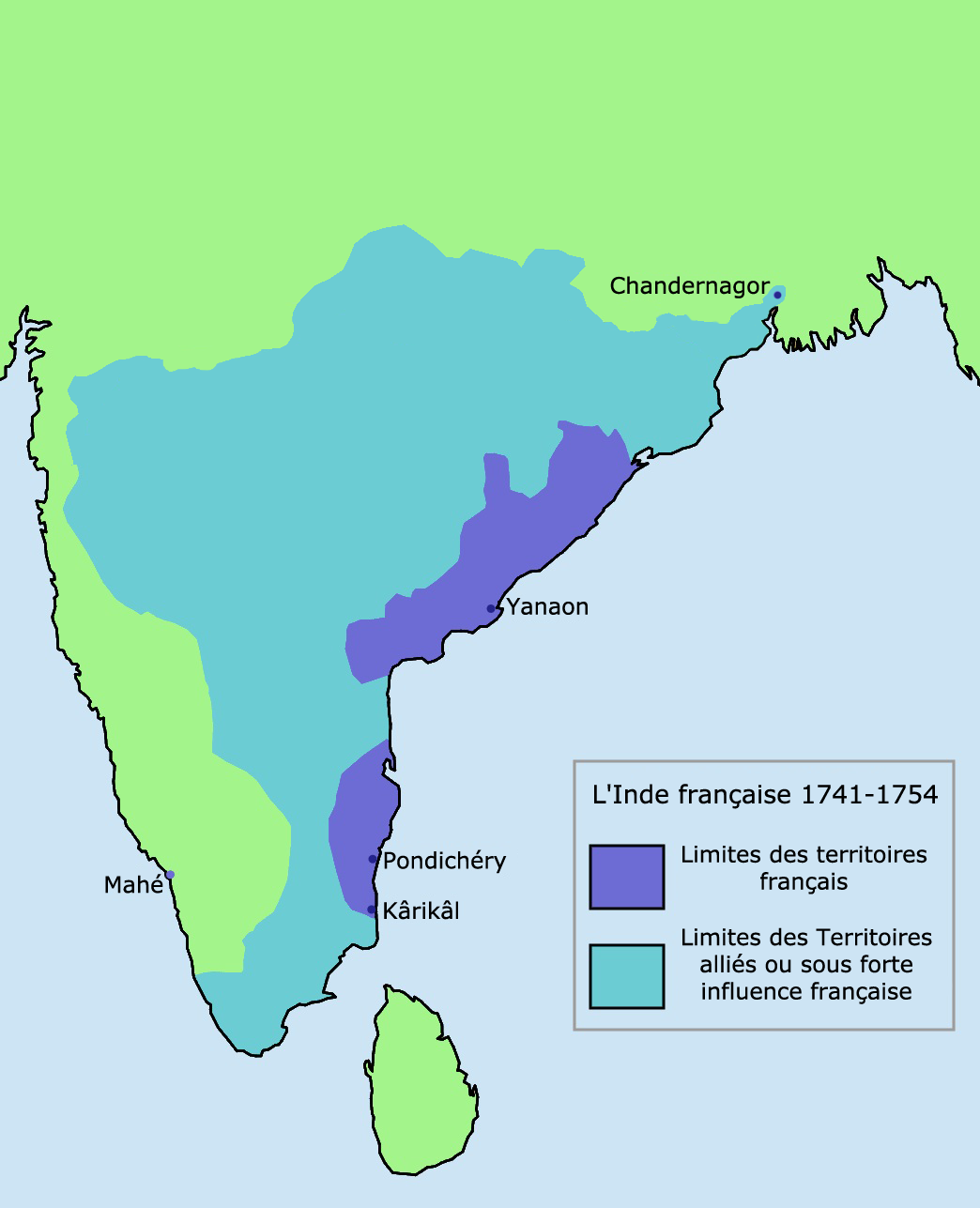
Maximum extension of French influence in India

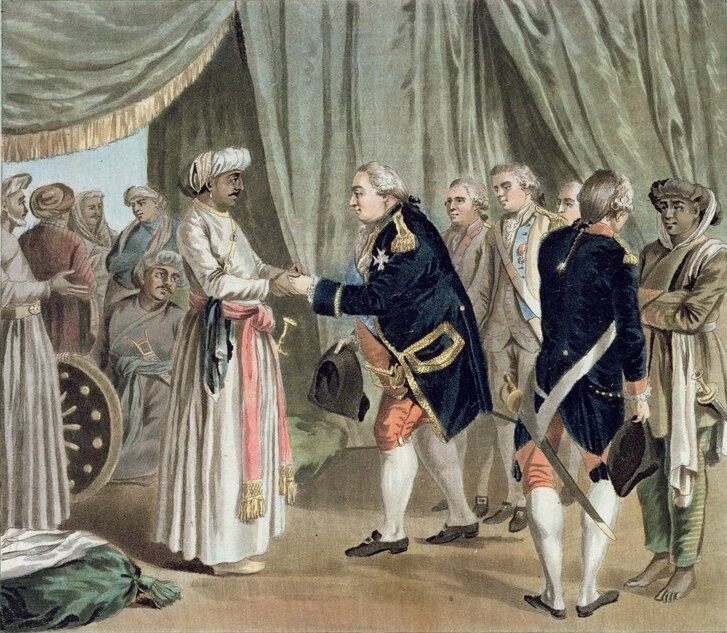
Suffren meeting with Hyder Ali in 1782, J.B. Morret engraving (1789)

After these first experiences, France took a more active role in Asia from its base in India. France was able to establish the beginnings of a commercial and territorial empire in India, leading to the formation of French India. Active Franco-Indian alliances were established to reinforce French influence and counter British influence on the subcontinent. Suffren had a considerable role in upholding French naval power in the Indian Ocean. Burma–France relations started in 1727 with approaches by Joseph François Dupleix, and were cemented in 1729 with the building of a shipyard in the city of Syriam. France allied with the Mon people and participated in the Burman-Mon conflict in 1751–1756 under Sieur de Bruno and Pierre de Milard.

The geographical exploration of Asia was expanded thanks to the efforts of Bougainville and La Pérouse.

Following the development of France-Vietnam relations through early trade and religious contacts, France intervened militarily in Vietnam at the end of the 18th century through the French assistance to Nguyễn Ánh under Mgr Pigneau de Behaine.

France thus managed to gain strong positions in South Asia and Southeast Asia, but these efforts were essentially wrecked with the outcome of the French Revolution and Napoleonic Wars.

Trade also developed, with the activities of people such as Pierre Poivre who dealt with Vietnam from the 1720s.

=== Asia in 17th–18th-century French art ===
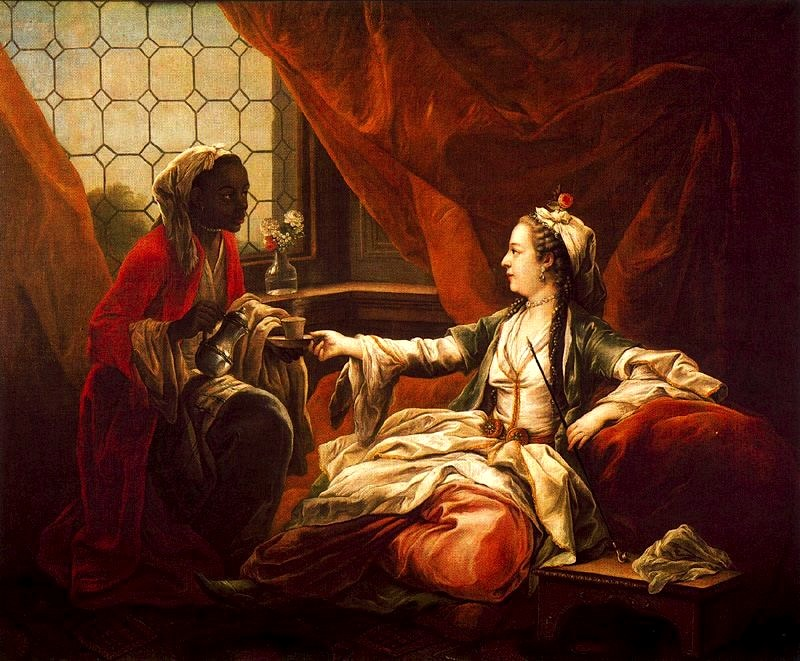
Madame de Pompadour portrayed as a Turkish lady by Charles André van Loo (1747)

The discovery of Asia led to a strong cultural interest in Asian arts. France especially developed a taste for artistic forms derived from Chinese art and narratives, called Chinoiserie, as well as for Turkish scenes, called Turquerie. French textile industry was also strongly influenced by Asian style, with the development of the silk and tapestry industries. A carpet industry façon de Turquie ("in the manner of Turkey") was developed in France in the reign of Henry IV by Pierre Dupont, who was returning from the Levant, and especially rose to prominence during the reign of Louis XIV. The Tapis de Savonnerie especially exemplify this tradition ("the superb carpets of the Savonnerie, which long rivalled the carpets of Turkey, and latterly have far surpassed them") which was further adapted to local taste and developed with the Gobelins carpets. This tradition also spread to Great Britain where it revived the British carpet industry in the 18th century.

== Napoleon's Asian ventures ==
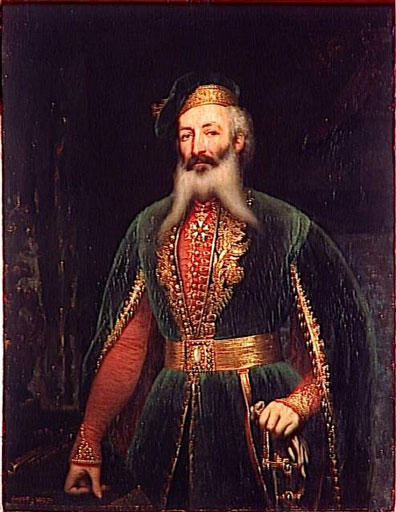
Jean-François Allard became a General in the army of Ranjit Singh.

For a brief period (1806—1815), France had an intense role in Indonesia, since the Netherlands became a province of France. The islands of Java and Bali were thus in contact with a Franco-Dutch administration. Napoleon handpicked a new Governor-General, the "Iron Marshall" Willem Daendels, sent ships and troops to reinforce the Dutch East Indies against possible British attacks, and had military fortifications built through the length of Java. A treaty of alliance was signed in 1808 between the new administration and the Balinese king of Badung, to provide workers and soldiers for the Franco-Dutch defensive effort, but Java was captured a British expedition in 1811, and the agreement was not implemented.

After the Napoleonic era, some former soldiers of Napoleon left France as mercenaries in Asian countries. One of them Jean-François Allard, became the leader of the European officer corps in the Punjab, in the Maharaja Ranjit Singh's service. Another mercenary of Ranjit Singh, Claude Auguste Court was an early student of Kushan coinage, whose coin–rubbings books are on display at the British Museum.

== Colonial era ==
Through its defeat in the Napoleonic Wars, France lost most of its colonial possessions, but the 19th century brought an era of Industrial Revolution combined with European expansionism that saw France expand anew to form a second colonial empire in Asia.

=== French Indochina ===
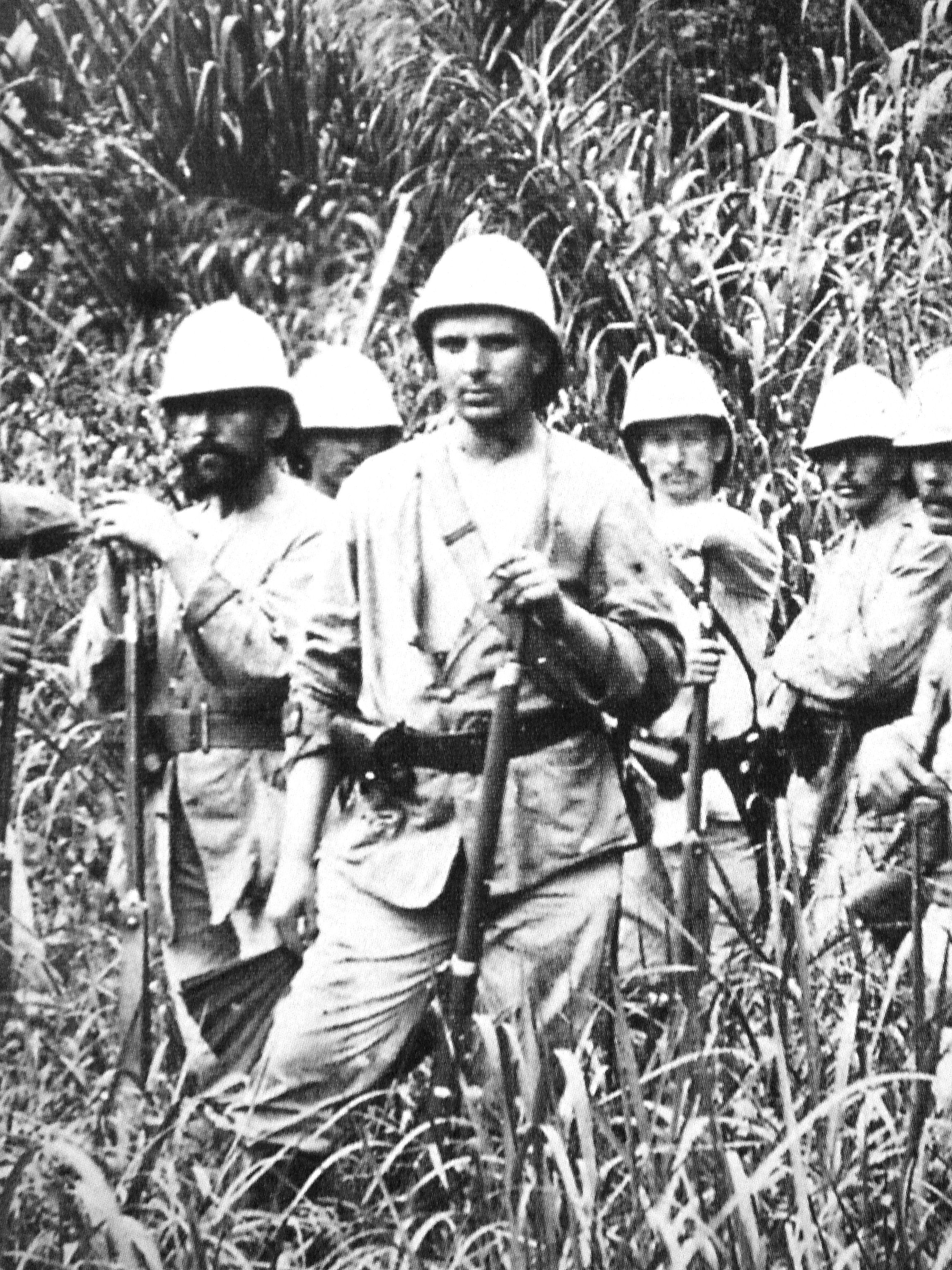
French soldiers in the Tonkin (c. 1890)

In the 1820s, France tried to reestablish contacts with Vietnam. On 12 January 1825, an embassy led by Captain Hyacinthe de Bougainville attempted to obtain a meeting with emperor Minh Mạng but failed. Instead, Christian missionaries were smuggled onshore in the person of Father Regéreau of the Paris Foreign Missions Society. These actions triggered edicts of persecution against Christianity by Minh Mạng. Using these persecutions as a pretext, in 1843, the French Foreign Minister, François Guizot, sent a fleet to the East under Admiral Jean-Baptiste Cécille and Captain Charner, together with the diplomat Lagrené. The move was in response to Britain's victory in the First Opium War in 1842, which France hoped to counterbalance by expanding their influence in Southern China. The pretext of the move was supporting British efforts in China, and to fight the persecution of French missionaries in Vietnam. New religious persecutions again triggered the Cochinchina campaign (1858–1862) which marked the real beginning of territorial expansion in Vietnam.

Expansion of French Indochina over Siam, as depicted in a map of Thailand's territorial losses

Northern Vietnam was then disputed with China, leading to the Tonkin campaign (1883–1886), and to French victory in the Sino-French War (1884–1885). France also expanded westward from its Vietnamese basis to dispute territory with Siam, leading to the Franco-Siamese conflict of 1893. French Indochina was formed in October 1887 from Annam, Tonkin, Cochinchina (which together form modern Vietnam), and the Kingdom of Cambodia. Laos was added after the Franco-Siamese crisis.

=== China campaigns ===
France intervened several times in China, together with other Western powers, to expand Western influence there. France participated actively to the Second Opium War in 1860, also using religious persecutions as a pretext. In 1900, the Boxer Rebellion led to massive French and Western intervention.

=== Korea ===
France also had an interventionist role in Northeast Asia throughout the second half of the 19th century.

In Korea, religious persecutions again motivated the French expedition to Korea in 1866. Although there were no territorial gains, these events would progressively lead to the opening of the "hermit kingdom" to the rest of the world.

=== Japan ===
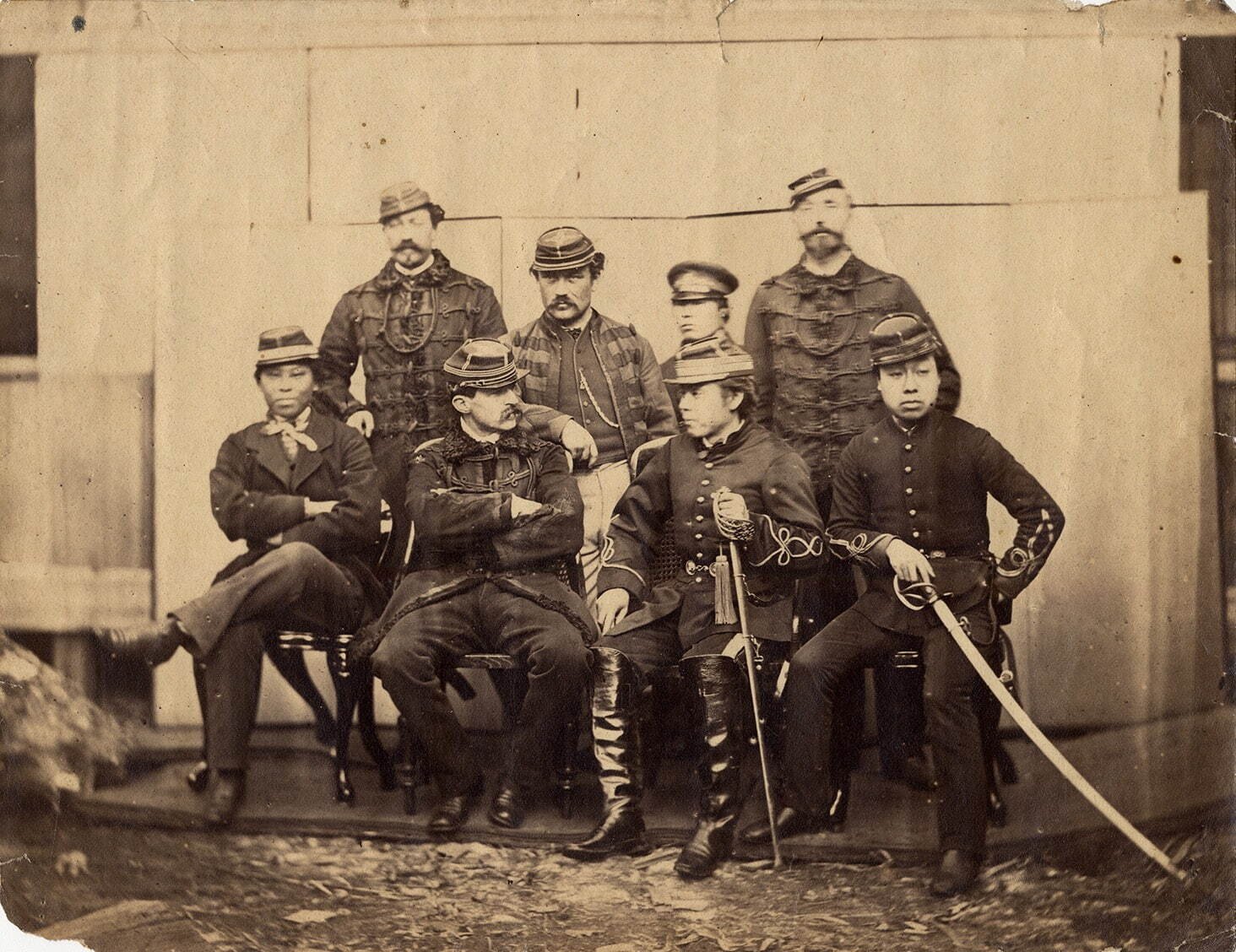
The French military advisers and their Japanese allies in Hokkaido in 1868

In Japan, France had a key role in fighting anti-foreign forces and supporting the Late Tokugawa shogunate. In 1863–1864, France battled anti-forces at the Bombardment of Shimonoseki. In 1867, a French military mission to Japan was sent by Napoleon III to support the shōgun. French soldiers such as Jules Brunet even fought on the side of the shōgun against pro-Imperial forces during the Boshin war.

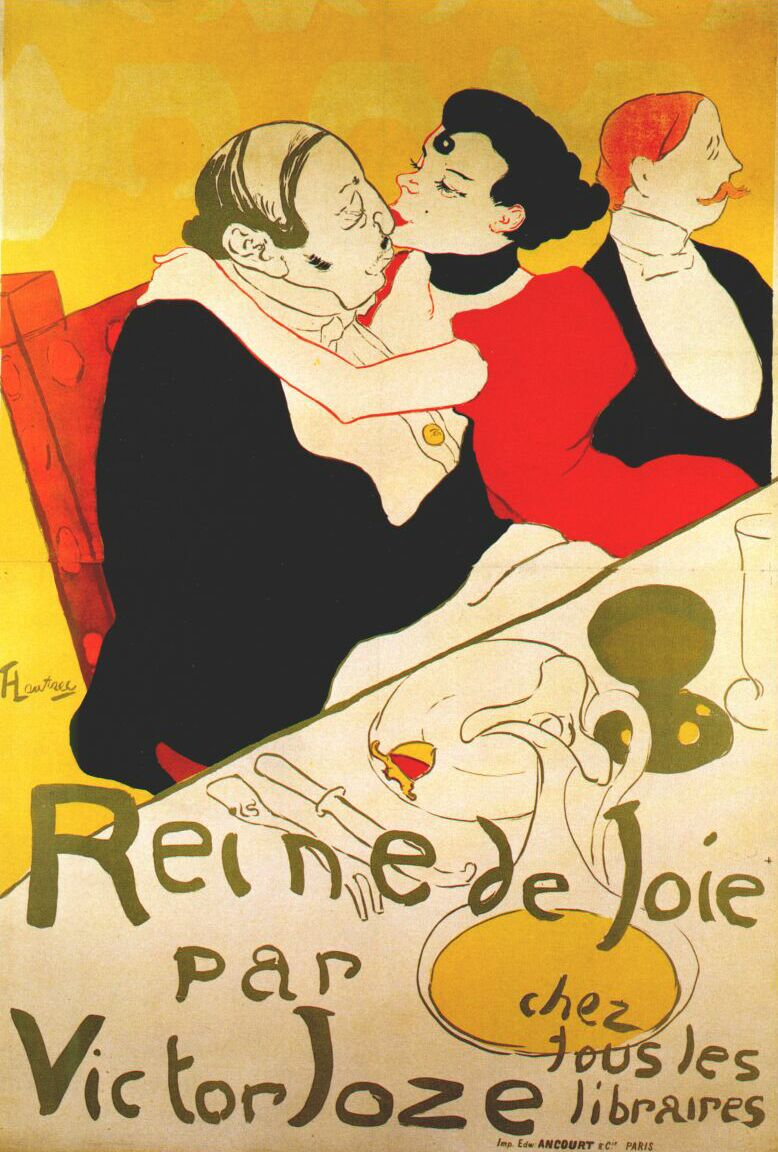
Henri de Toulouse-Lautrec lithograph poster of 1892, an example of Japonism

Although the shōgun was defeated in the Boshin war, France continued to take an active role in supporting Japan military through the 1872–1880 mission, the 1884–1889 mission, the 1918–1919 mission, and had a key role in the development of the Imperial Japanese Navy with the mission of Emile Bertin.

=== Asia in 19th-century French art ===
Asia influenced Western authors, and especially French ones, in an artistic school known as Orientalism. Asian scenes were typically depicted in an idealistic and voluptuous manner. Impressionism also was strongly influenced by the vividness of Japanese painting through Japonism. French literature was also strongly influenced by Asia, as in the works of Pierre Loti.

== Decolonization and modern collaboration ==
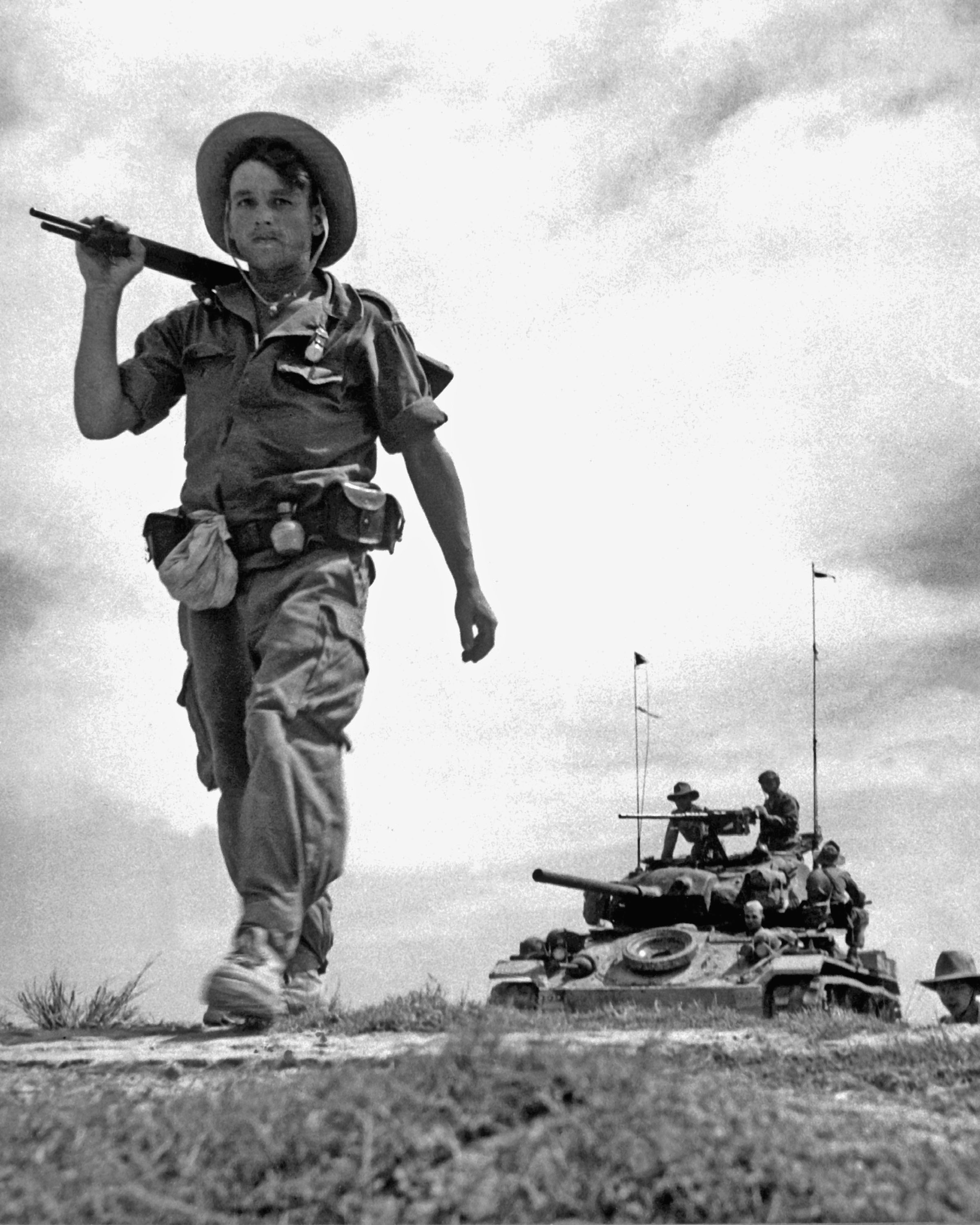
A French Foreign Legion unit patrols in a Communist-controlled area during the Indochina War.

The 20th century was marked by the French difficulties during World War II, and the general decolonization that followed. In particular, the Indochina War (1946–1954) marked the end of French military presence in Southeast Asia.

Since then, contacts have resumed, and France has remained a strong economic partner to Asian countries. French exports include nuclear power technologies, advanced transportation technologies such as Airbus or TGV, food products, and consumer industries. Asia in turn finds in France a receptive market for its manufactured goods.

== Gallery ==
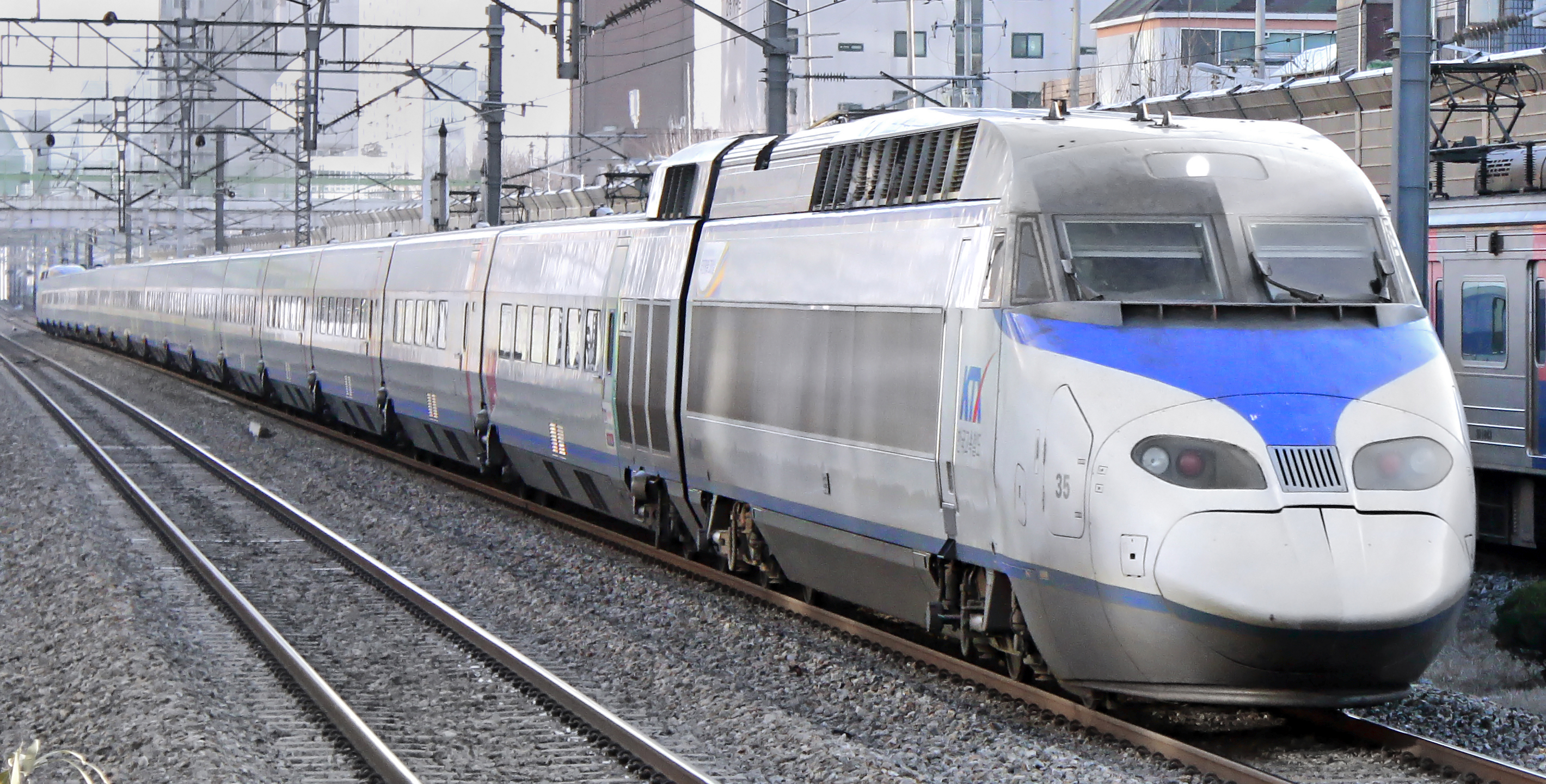
A TGV-based Korea Train Express train

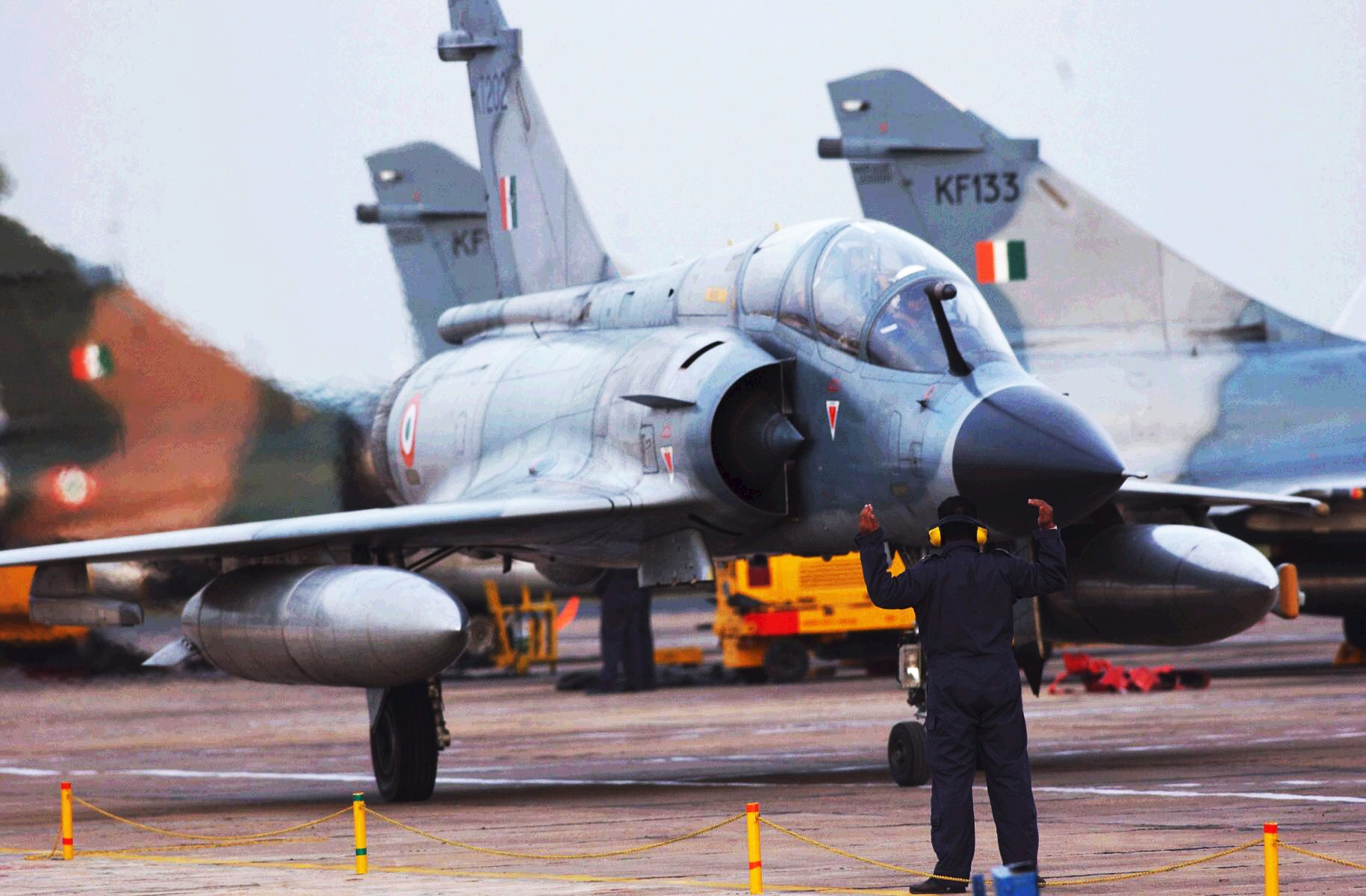
The Indian Air Force has the second largest fleet of France's Mirage 2000H after Armée de l'Air.

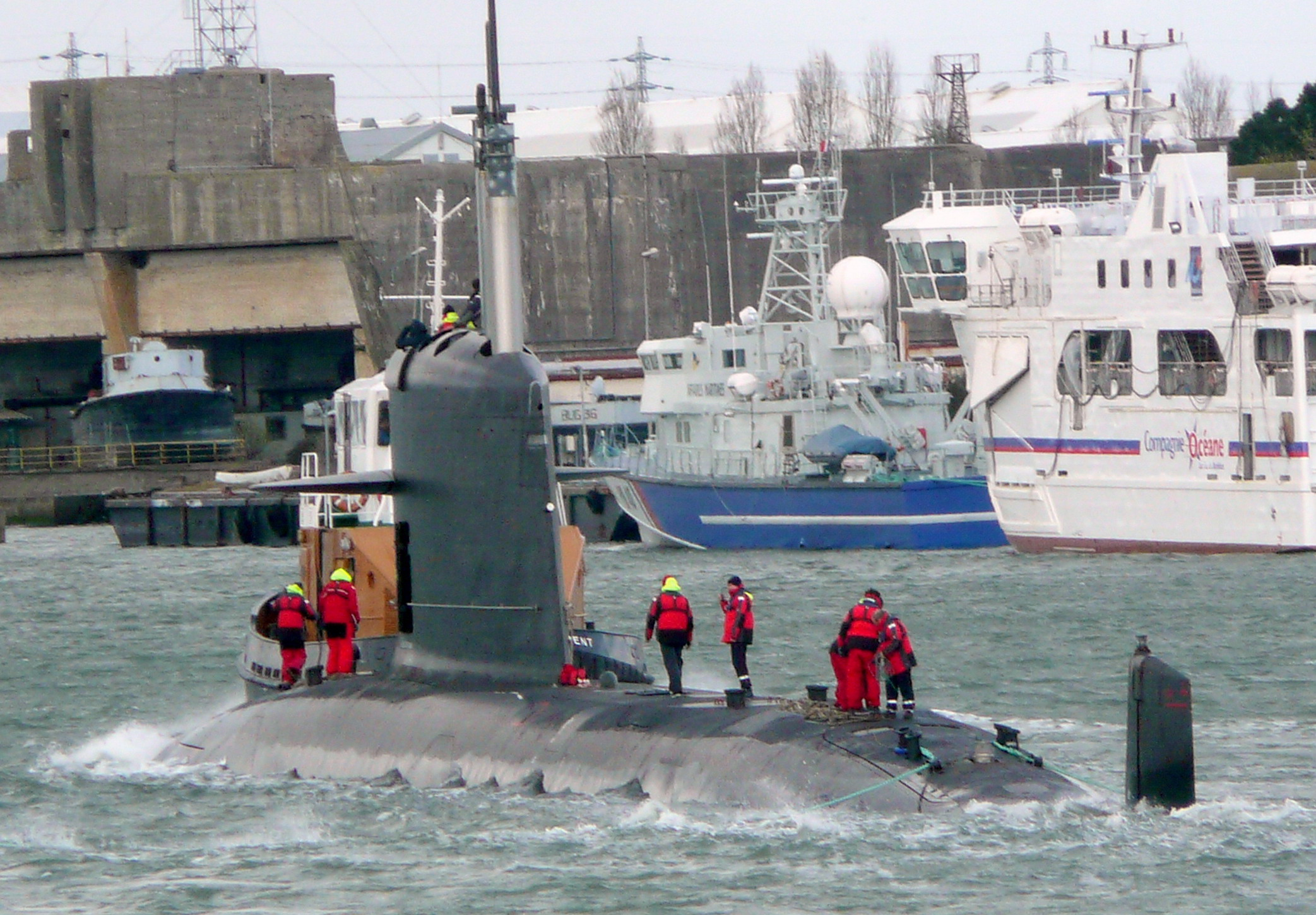
The Scorpène-class submarine has been ordered by the Royal Malaysian Navy and the Indian Navy.

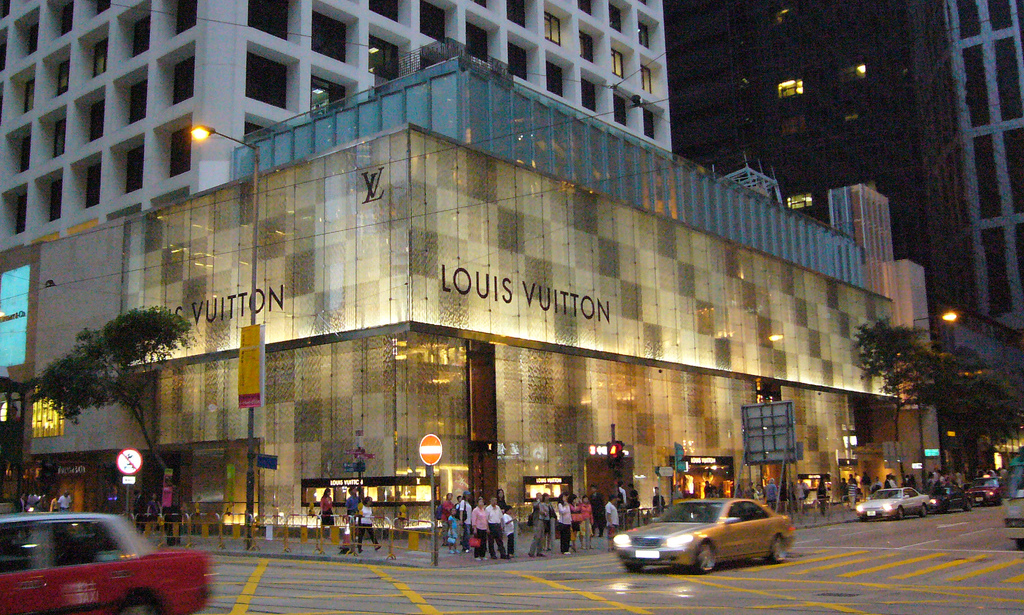
A Louis Vuitton store in Hong Kong

== France's foreign relations with Asian countries ==
- Afghanistan–France relations
- Armenia–France relations
- Azerbaijan–France relations
- Bahrain–France relations
- Bangladesh–France relations
- Bhutan–France relations
- Brunei–France relations
- Cambodia–France relations
- China–France relations
- Cyprus–France relations
- (Georgia (country)) France–Georgia relations
- France–India relations
- France–Indonesia relations
- France–Iran relations
- France–Iraq relations
- France–Israel relations
- France–Japan relations
- France–Jordan relations
- France–Kazakhstan relations
- France–Kuwait relations
- France–Kyrgyzstan relations
- France–Laos relations
- France–Lebanon relations
- France–Malaysia relations
- France–Maldives relations
- France–Mongolia relations
- France–Myanmar relations
- France–Nepal relations
- France–North Korea relations
- France–Oman relations
- France–Pakistan relations
- France–Palestine relations
- France–Philippines relations
- France–Qatar relations
- France–Saudi Arabia relations
- France–Singapore relations
- France–South Korea relations
- France–Sri Lanka relations
- France–Syria relations
- France–Taiwan relations
- France–Tajikistan relations
- France–Thailand relations
- France–Timor-Leste relations
- France–Turkey relations
- France–Turkmenistan relations
- France–United Arab Emirates relations
- France–Uzbekistan relations
- France–Vietnam relations
- France–Yemen relations

== See also ==
- Chronology of European exploration of Asia

== Bibliography ==
- Boardman, John The Diffusion of Classical Art in Antiquity, Princeton 1993 ISBN 0-691-03680-2
- Boutin, Aimée, and Elizabeth Emery, eds. "Cultural Exchange and Creative Identity: France/Asia in the Nineteenth and Early Twentieth Centuries", L'Esprit Créateur, The International Quarterly of French and Francophone Studies, Volume 56, Number 3, Fall 2016,
- Cotterell, Arthur. Western Power in Asia: Its Slow Rise and Swift Fall, 1415–1999 (John Wiley & Sons, 2010).
- Fletcher, Richard, 2004, The Cross and the Crescent, Penguin Books, ISBN 978-0-14-101207-0
- Hanna, Willard A. (2004). Bali Chronicles Periplus, Singapore. ISBN 0-7946-0272-X.
- Merriman, Roger Bigelow. Suleiman the Magnificent 1520–1566 READ BOOKS, 2007 ISBN 1-4067-7272-0
- Miller, William. The Ottoman Empire and Its Successors, 1801–1927 Routledge, 1966 ISBN 0-7146-1974-4
- Lamb, Harold. Suleiman the Magnificent – Sultan of the East READ BOOKS, 2008 ISBN 1-4437-3144-7
- Lee, Robert. France and the exploitation of China, 1885–1901: A study in economic imperialism (Hong Kong: Oxford University Press, 1989).
- McAbe, Ina Baghdiantz 2008 Orientalism in early Modern France Berg ISBN 978-1-84520-374-0
- O'Callaghan, Joseph F. A History of Medieval Spain Cornell University Press, 1983 ISBN 0-8014-9264-5
- Starostina, Natalia. "Engineering the Empire of Images: Constructing Railways in Asia before the Great War." Southeast Review of Asian Studies 31 (2009): 181–206.
- Tucker, Spencer C. Vietnam University Press of Kentucky (1999). ISBN 0-8131-0966-3.
- French & Francophone Studies, Volume 21, 2017 – Issue 1: France-Asia.
