= Henri de Feynes =

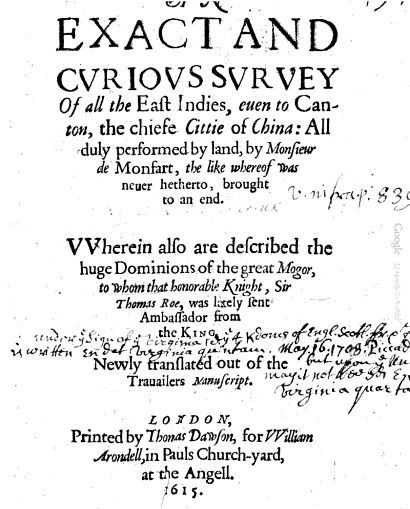
Exact and Curious survey by Henri de Feynes, 1615.

Henri de Feynes, Comte de Monfart, Monsart or Montfort, was a 17th-century French explorer and adventurer who was the first Frenchman to visit China. He may have been sent on a secret mission by King Henry IV. Henri de Feynes arrived in China in 1609, after three years travelling on land and on the seas. He finally reached the city of Canton.

Henri de Feynes published an account of his journey in London in 1615. His book was then published in French in 1630. Long thought to be a charlatan, corroboration having been found from contemporaries Jean Mocquet and François Pyrard, his account is now recognised as genuine.

== Works ==
- Henri de Feynes An exact and curious suruey of all the East Indies, euen to Canton 1615, London
- Henri de Feynes Voyage par terre depuis Paris jusques à la Chine (Paris, 1630)

== See also ==
- France-Asia relations
