= Jean Mocquet =

Jean Mocquet (1576 – after 1617) was a French traveller and royal apothecary. He made six long sea voyages, and attempted a circumnavigation of Earth, apparently in order mainly to collect plants and animal specimen for King Henry IV of France. He published an account of his travels in 1617, Voyages en Afrique, Asie, Indes orientales et occidentales.

== Biography ==
Mocquet was born in Meaux in Île-de-France. He was apothecary of the French king, and travelled widely during his life. He referred to himself as "keeper of the cabinet of curiosities of the King in the Tuileries".

He made in total six sea voyages, including to South America and India, and attempted a circumnavigation of Earth. Mocquet was apparently commissioned by King Henry IV to collect items fitting for furnishing a cabinet of curiosities during his travels. His main interest appears to have been the collection of plants and animals unknown or rare in Europe, though he also made ethnographic observations.

== Travels ==
Mocquet's first voyage began on 9 October 1601, when he accompanied the ship La Serène from Saint-Malo to the Canary Islands and the coast of north Africa. His second journey was with Daniel de La Touche, Lord of La Ravardière, and started in January 1604 and lasted until May; it carried him across the Atlantic Ocean via Lanzarote and Cape Verde to the mouth of the Amazon River, and further along the coast of South America to the Caribbean. Mocquet's third voyage went to Morocco in 1605–1607. In October 1607 he set out from Paris again, this time on a journey that would take him via Portugal to Goa in India; it was a journey fraught with difficulties, but he returned to France August 1610. During his stay in Goa he met his compatriot traveller François Pyrard de Laval. He however soon set out again, travelling through the Mediterranean to Lebanon and Jerusalem via Cyprus, Malta and Sardinia. His last voyage was commenced in the summer of 1614. Mocquet had the intention of making a circumnavigation of the globe, but he only reached the south of Spain before he had to abort his efforts and returned to Paris. His health was then apparently in rapid decline.

Mocquet wrote and published an account of his voyages, Voyages en Afrique, Asie, Indes orientales et occidentales published in 1617. His description of the natives of South America is sympathetic, and contains detailed descriptions of ethnological interest. He also provided descriptions of the nature of the regions visited, including on the uses of aloe and honey from stingless bees.

After the death of the king in 1610, the plans to expand the royal cabinet of curiosities were abandoned. Mocquet appealed discretely to Marie de' Medici to let him continue the project, but without success.

== Sources cited ==
- de Cilleuls, Jean (1961a). "Les grands voyages de Jean Mocquet, apothicaire du "Cabinet des Singularitez" de Louis XIII aux Tuileries". Revue d'Histoire de la Pharmacie (in French). 49 (168): 10–17. doi:10.3406/pharm.1961.7566.
- de Cilleuls, Jean (1961b). "Les grands voyages de Jean Mocquet, apothicaire et garde du "Cabinet des Singularitez" de Louis XIII aux Tuileries (Suite et fin)". Revue d'Histoire de la Pharmacie (in French). 49 (169): 78–85. doi:10.3406/pharm.1961.7576.
- Howgego, Raymond John (2003). Encyclopedia of exploration to 1800. Hordern House. ISBN 1 875567 36 4.
- Schnapper, Antoine (2012) [1988]. Le géant, la licorne et la tulipe : Les cabinets de curiosités en France au XVIIe sciècle (in French). Paris: Flammarion. ISBN 978-2-0812-8263-6.
