= Jean de Breuilly =

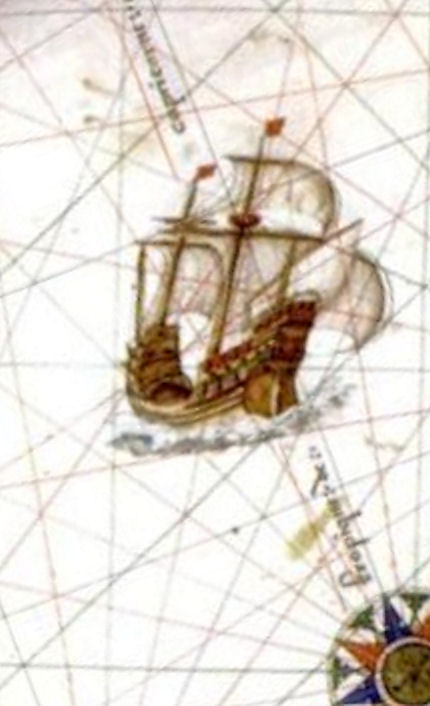
Sailing ship near Java la Grande in Vallard Atlas 1547, Dieppe school.

Jean de Breuilly was a 16th-century French adventurer from Honfleur. In 1528, he left for an expedition to Asia, to seek the whereabouts of the expedition of Pierre Caunay, but was unable to find it.

Jean de Breuilly stopped at Zanzibar in March 1528. He then arrived in the harbour of Diu on the Indian coast, but there his ship was seized by the Portuguese.

His ship seems to have been called the Marie de Bon Secours, also named Grand Anglais.

== See also ==
- France-Asia relations
