= Pierre Caunay =

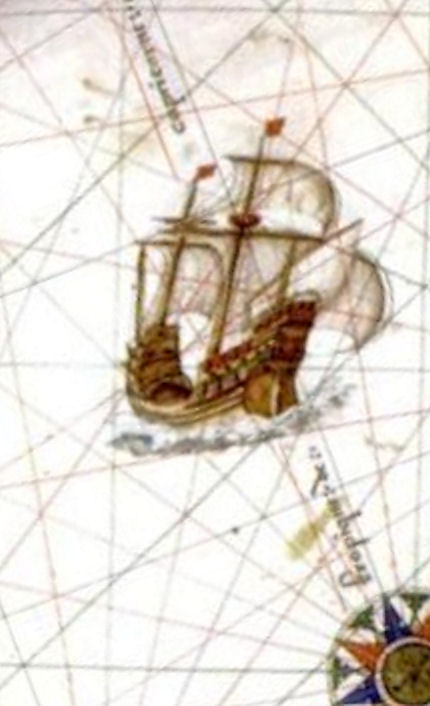
Sailing ship near Java la Grande in Vallard Atlas 1547, Dieppe school.

Pierre Caunay was a 16th-century French adventurer from Honfleur. In 1526, Pierre Caunay sailed to Sumatra, with the objective of reaching the Moluccas to participate in the spice trade. He was part of a fleet of three ships, sponsored by Francis I, financed by a bank of Florence, and set up by entrepreneur Jean Ango and the Verrazano brothers. The ships were separated in the Atlantic, and two of them, led by the brother Verrazano, continued to Brazil. Pierre Cauny however passed the Cape of Good Hope and continued to reach Sumatra. Part of his crew was killed in Aceh in Sumatra, as well as his Portuguese pilot, so that Pierre Caunay decided to return to France.

He lost his ship on the return leg between Africa and Madagascar. Twelve of the crew survived and sailed to Mozambique, where they were imprisoned by the Portuguese. Their story was reported by the Governor of Mozambique himself. Some other sailed stayed in Madagascar, where they were picked up by later ships.

The expedition of Jean de Breuilly in 1528 was sent to seek the whereabouts of the expedition of Pierre Caunay, but was unable to find it.

== See also ==
- France-Asia relations
