= France–Nepal relations =

- France: Nepal

Diplomatic mission
- Embassy of France, Kathmandu: Embassy of Nepal, Paris

Envoy
- French Ambassador to Nepal Gilles Bourbao: Nepalese Ambassador to France Dipak Adhikari

France–Nepal relations are diplomatic relations between France and Nepal.

France–Nepal relations were officially established on 20 April 1949.

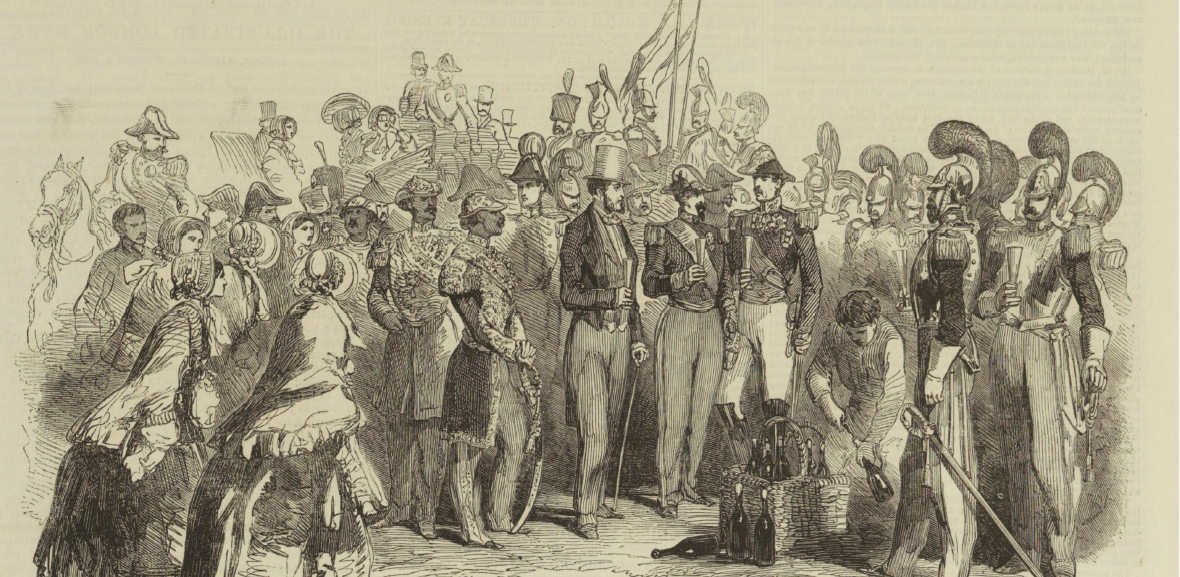
Prime Minister Jung Bahadur Rana in Paris, 1850

Nowadays there are tens of thousands of Nepali citizens that have immigrated to and reside in France, mostly in the Paris Ile-de-France region and Marseille. In addition, there are hundreds of Nepali men serve in the ranks of the French Foreign Legion.
