= L'Esprit Créateur =

- Discipline: French literature
- Language: English, French
- Edited by: Mária Minich Brewer; Daniel Brewer

Publication details
- History: 1961–present
- Publisher: Johns Hopkins University Press (United States)
- Frequency: Quarterly

Standard abbreviations
- ISO 4: Esprit Créat.

Indexing
- ISSN: 0014-0767 (print); 1931-0234 (web)
- OCLC no.: 1568231

Links
- Journal homepage; Online access; Online archive

L'Esprit Créateur is a quarterly academic journal established in 1961 and published by the Johns Hopkins University Press. The journal is dedicated to the study of French and Francophone literature, and the literary and cultural criticism surrounding them. Each issue focuses on a specific theme or critical issue and includes reviews and illustrations. The journal's founding editor was John Erickson. The current editors-in-chief are Mária Minich Brewer and Daniel Brewer (Department of French and Italian, University of Minnesota).
