= Cyprus–France relations =

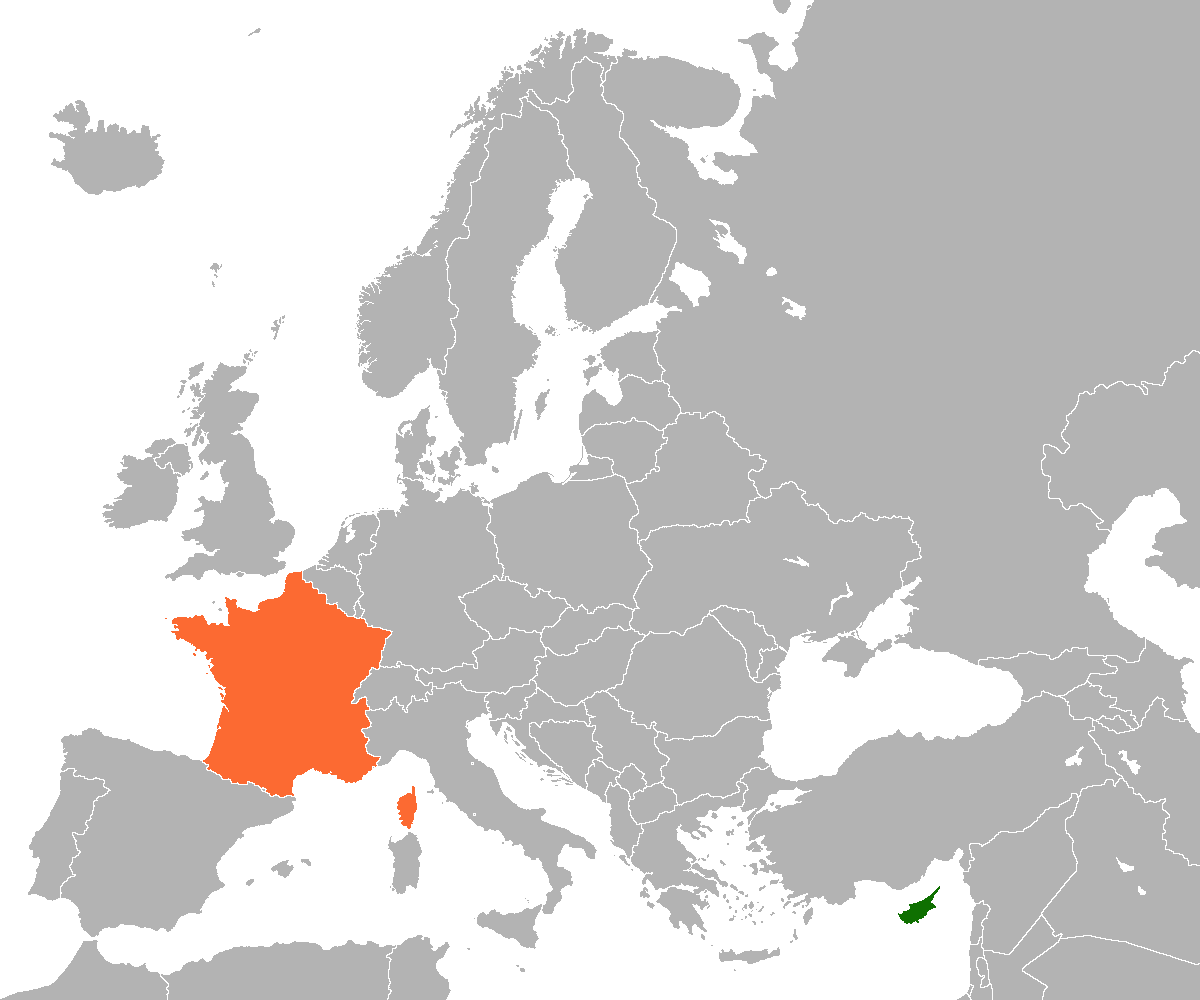
- Cyprus: France

Cyprus–France relations refers to the diplomatic, political, economic, cultural, and defense ties between the Republic of Cyprus and France. The two countries share membership of the European Union, Council of Europe and Organization for Security and Co-operation in Europe. Cyprus is an associate member of the Francophonie organization since 2006. France is a supporter of Cyprus against Turkey's refusal to recognize and admit Cypriot ships and planes. France recognized Cyprus on 16 August 1960. France fully supported Cyprus's application to join the European Union, which concluded with membership on 1 May 2004. France maintains an embassy in Nicosia, and Cyprus maintains an embassy in Paris.

== Background ==
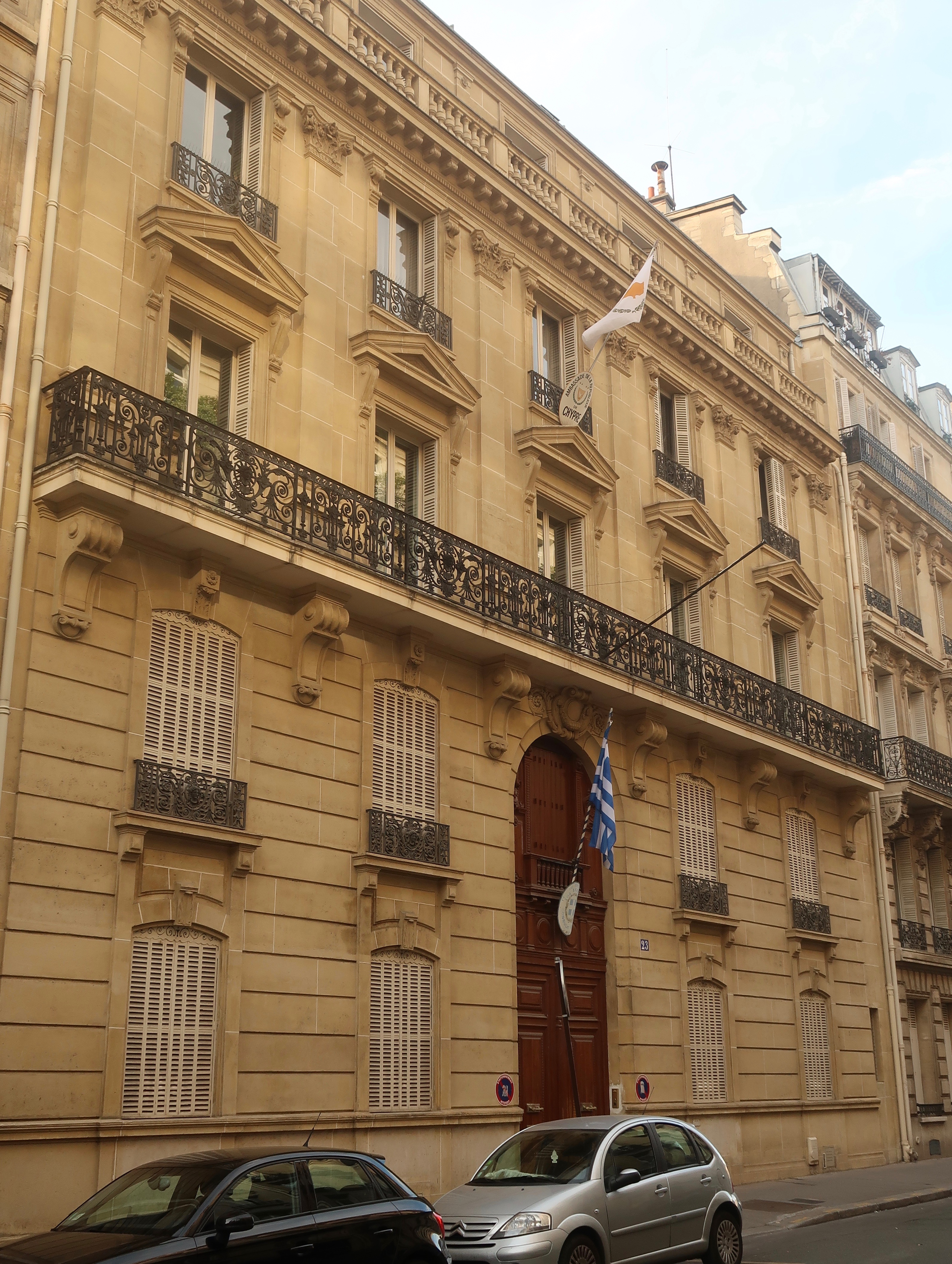
Embassy of Cyprus in Paris

Relations between the two countries date back centuries to the medieval period. Cyprus was ruled by the French origin House of Lusignan (1192–1489), which established a Frankish kingdom on the island following the Third Crusade. The Lusignan period left a lasting cultural and architectural influence on Cyprus.

Modern diplomatic relations were established after Cyprus gained independence from the United Kingdom in 1960. France has traditionally supported Cyprus's sovereignty and territorial integrity, particularly following the 1974 events on the island. France is one of the countries that supports Cyprus's accession to the European Union.

== Defense and security cooperation ==
The two countries hold close defense cooperation that has helped consolidate their relations, as well as singing several bilateral defense agreements, meant to enhance the military coordination between the two in the Eastern Mediterranean. Both countries hold joint military exercises on a regular basis, as France regards Cyprus as a location in which helps it strengthen its strategic footprint in the region. Cyprus has shown interest in buying French military equipment, thus expanding their defense collaboration.

== Energy cooperation ==
Recent discoveries of hydrocarbon in the Eastern Mediterranean, have increased cooperation between the two countries, as France's multinational energy company TotalEnergies has been licensed to explore and drill in Cyprus's Exclusive Economic Zone (EEZ). France has expressed political support for Cyprus's sovereign rights to exploit natural resources within its EEZ in accordance with international law.

== Economic relations ==
France is an important trade partner for Cyprus within the European Union. Bilateral trade includes pharmaceuticals, machinery, agricultural products, and services. French companies operate in sectors such as energy, infrastructure, and defense in Cyprus, while Cypriot shipping and services firms maintain business links with France.

== Educational and cultural cooperation ==
The Alliance française of Limassol, in partnership with the Institut français, has for many years been a major player in the promotion of French language and culture in Cyprus. Several schools and universities offer French courses, strengthening the educational ties between the two countries. In an informal setting, French is taught in public structures such as the Public Language Institutes (150 learners in 2020–2021), the Supplementary Education Centers (90); at the Cypriot Academy (90); or in the private sector at the French Institute (400 learners), or in the AF of Limassol and Paphos (111 learners). In addition, the presence of L'école Franco-cypriote, has strengthened relations between Cyprus and the French language. The Franco-Cypriot school also aims to promote French and Cypriot languages and cultures, in a European and international perspective.

== 2026 ==
During the 2026 Iran conflict, drone were sent targeting Cyprus, mainly targeting the RAF Akrotiri. Following this attack France sent anti missile and anti drone systems to Cyprus. On 9 March 2026 President Macron landed for a visit in Cyprus, expressing solidarity after the Iranian attack. He will meet with Cypriot President Nikos Christodoulides and Greek Prime Kyriakos Mitsotakis.

== See also ==
- Foreign relations of Cyprus
- Foreign relations of France
