= François Pyrard de Laval =

French navigator and writer

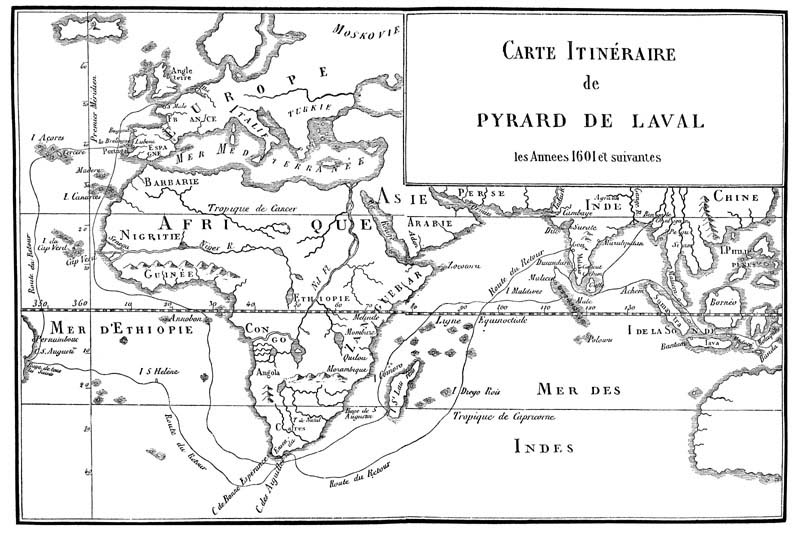
Itinerary of François Pyrard de Laval

François Pyrard de Laval (French pronunciation: [fʁɑ̃swa piʁaʁ də laval]; c. 1578 – ca. 1623) was a French navigator who is remembered for a personal written account of his adventures in the Maldives from 1602 to 1607, which was part of a ten-year journey (1601–1611) in South Asia.

He was a native of Laval, and was a cousin to theologian Pierre Pyrard (1581–1667).

On 2 July 1602, Pyrard and a handful of sailors were shipwrecked on South Maalhosmadulu Atoll of the Maldives. They were taken captive by the Maldivians and spent five years as "unwilling guests" on the islands, with most of the time spent on Malé. The sailors endured malaria and what was noted by Pyrard as "sporadic cruel treatment" during their captivity.

Pyrard learnt the local Dhivehi language and by doing so was able to achieve an insight into Maldivian society never before experienced and documented by a European. He took extensive notes regarding Dhivehi culture, customs and history.

In February 1607, the Frenchmen escaped from Malé by boat in the midst of chaos during a Bengali raid. Shortly after his return to Laval in 1611, Pyrard published an account of his 1601–1611 journey.

== Bibliography ==
"The Voyage of François Pyrard of Laval to the East Indies, the Maldives, the Moluccas, and Brazil".

Variously translated and published in English in three volumes

Volume 1 - ISBN 978-1-4094-1343-1

Volume 2 - ISBN 978-1-02-040707-9

Volume 3 - ISBN 978-1-108-01347-5

== See also ==
- France-Asia relations
