= Cristóvão de Mendonça =

Portuguese nobleman and explorer

- Born: 1475; Mourão, Kingdom of Portugal
- Died: 1532 (aged 56–57); Ormus
- Occupation: Explorer
- Parent(s): Diogo de Mendonça; Brites Soares de Albergaria

Cristóvão de Mendonça (Mourão, 1475 – Ormus, 1532) was a Portuguese noble and explorer who was active in South East Asia in the 16th century.

== Mendonça in João de Barros's Décadas da Ásia ==
Mendonça is known from a small number of Portuguese sources, notably João de Barros. Barros was one of the first great Portuguese historians, most famous for his work Décadas da Ásia (Decades of Asia), a history of the Portuguese Empire in India and Asia, published between 1552–1615. Barros mentions that Cristóvão de Mendonça was the son of a Pedro de Mendonça of Mourão, but his date of birth is not given. Mendonça later governed Hormuz (Ormus) as Captain-Major from 1527. He died there in 1532.

Mendonça is named by Barros as the captain of a ship that left Lisbon in 1519 and, after arriving at Goa, as having been given instructions to search for Pliny's legendary Isles of Gold (Chryse), said to lie to "beyond Sumatra":

At the end of June of the year 1520, a ship arrived that had departed the Kingdom that year, the Captain and Pilot being Pedro Eanes, nicknamed the Frenchman, who being a diligent man and one well versed in matters of the sea, King Manuel had entrusted with letters for Diogo Lopez concerning matters of service. And among other things that the King ordered Diogo Lopez to do that year, was to send some person in the same ship with Pedro Eanes, to who would be entrusted to go to discover the Isles of Gold beyond Sumatra, of which we have already written above, for many persons who had gone to these parts of India had given him great hope that they could be discovered. Diogo Lopez then entrusted this to Christovão de Mendoça, the son of Pero Mendoça the lord mayor of Mourão; of whose voyage we will make mention below.

Barros promises to return to the topic of the voyage to the Isles of Gold, and subsequently does so, relating how Mendonça was diverted from the quest by the requirement to assist with the building and defence of a fort at Pedir in the territory of the Sumatran principality of Pacem (Pasai). Mendonça and other Portuguese captains are described as assisting with the construction of a fort at Pedir (Sumatra), after which he proceeded to Malacca:

And there came to the port of Pedir Raphael Catanho and Christovão de Mendoça with his three ships for the discovery of the Isles of Gold… Antonio de Brito was still commanding there… as the construction of the fortress had taken much time, and Raphael Catanho, Raphael Perstrello, and Christovão de Mendoça had to provision and take on pepper and other things for their voyages, and also as the monsoon season by which they each had to go, principally Christovão de Mendoça, had already passed, they were all ordered to stay there to assist and support the fortress, as it was not yet in a state where it could be defended… After putting the fort in a good state of defence, Christovão de Mendoça and Dinis Fernandez departed for Malacca.

As there is no further mention by Barros of the quest by Cristóvão de Mendonça for the Ilhas do Ouro, it is not clear whether he ever carried out this commission, or whether Barros intended to explain why it was not carried out by relating how he was diverted by the defence of Pedir.

Barros relates that prior to Mendonça being ordered to discover the Isles of Gold they had already been sought by Diogo Pacheco, whose attempt came to grief on the coast of Sumatra:

Diogo Pacheco came there a little before Manuel Pacheco from Malacca, and brought great information on the Isles of Gold that were generally known in India to be to the south of Sumatra. For the discovery of which Diogo Lopez ordered him to go, for he, Diogo Pacheco was most knowledgeable in matters of the sea and had great ability as a discoverer, besides being himself a gentleman… The weather was such that the sea swallowed the brigantine, and the ship came onto the coast ... this destruction of Diogo Pacheco, was the first of those of us who lost their lives for the discovery of this Isle of Gold.

The belief in the Isles of Gold/Ilhas do Ouro derived from the legendary Suvarnadvipa and (Suvarnabhumi) mentioned in ancient Indian literature and incorporated into Graeco-Roman geography as the Islands of Gold and Silver (Chryse and Argyre) and the Golden Chersonese (Chersonesus Aurea).

== Mendonça and the theory of the Portuguese discovery of Australia ==
Mendonça's name has featured prominently in relation to a theory that Portuguese mariners visited Australia, during the 16th century. While few surviving Portuguese documents or maps, beyond Barros, mention Mendonça, and none of these mention Australia, Kenneth McIntyre (1977) hypothesized that Mendonça may have led a fleet of three caravels that visited the east coast of Australia in 1521–24. In one of his last pieces of writing on the topic (1994), McIntyre stated that whether "the discoverer was Mendonça or some other ... [I am] certain he was Portuguese".

In particular, McIntyre suggested, the "Mahogany Ship", an unidentified wreck near Warrnambool, Victoria, may have been a caravel. However, by the time that McIntyre put forward his hypotheses, the wreck had not been seen for about 90 years. While the Mahogany Ship has often been described in the Australian media as resembling a Portuguese caravel, such identifications followed, rather than preceded McIntyre's theory.

McIntyre pointed out that any such Portuguese expedition would likely have remained secret, because it might have violated the Treaty of Tordesillas, under which Portugal agreed that Spain would have exclusive rights to exploration in the Pacific. In addition, McIntyre argued, many Portuguese records were lost in the disastrous Lisbon earthquake of 1755.

Other Australian authors who have supported McIntyre's theory, including his suggestion of Mendonça as the likely commander of such a fleet include Lawrence Fitzgerald (1984) and Peter Trickett (2007).

== Recent work ==
In his 2007 book Beyond Capricorn, science journalist Peter Trickett revealed other information relating to Mendonça's life, including a fragment of stone engraved with Mendonça's name found in South Africa and clearly dated 1524, and a drawing that may show the 1519 fleet on its way to Goa. Trickett also connected Mendonça with the discovery of the North Island of New Zealand.

Luis Felipe Thomaz, Professor of Oriental Studies at the Universidade Católica Portuguesa, Lisbon, contributed a study of the expedition of Cristóvão de Mendonça to the conference, “Portugueses na Austrália”, held at the Museu da Ciência, Coimbra, Portugal in May 2008.

== Other points of view ==
Commenting on McIntyre's theory in 1984, Captain A. Ariel suggested it was extremely unlikely any sixteenth century mariner would have taken a voyage southwards down Australia's eastern coast, through uncharted dangerous waters and against prevailing winds, on the assumption Magellan was sailing westwards, in southern latitudes, against the Roaring Forties.

Writing in 2006, Associate Professor W.A.R.(Bill) Richardson of Flinders University, South Australia suggested the claim that Cristóvão de Mendonça sailed down the east coast of Australia is sheer speculation, based on voyages about which no real details have survived.

== See also ==
- Portuguese discoveries
- History of Australia before 1901
