= Belfast Coastal Reserve =

Protected area in Victoria, Australia

Belfast Coastal Reserve (Australia)

Belfast Coastal Reserve is a narrow belt of public land on the Shipwreck Coast about 300 kilometres south-west of Melbourne in the State of Victoria, Australia. Stretching 22 kilometres from Levys Point Reserve at Warrnambool in the east, to Belfast Lough at Port Fairy in the west, it comprises rocky reefs, sandy beaches, coastal dunes, salt marshes and estuaries.

Originally set aside for recreation, education and conservation, the reserve has been severely degraded due to neglect and inappropriate use, for example commercial activities such as sand mining and grazing, and high-impact recreational activities such as off-road driving. School and community groups, together with natural resource and land managers, have worked over recent decades to restore native vegetation to improve biodiversity, habitat and stabilise the dunes.

Many rare and endangered animals are either resident in the reserve, such as the Eastern Mourning Skink, or inhabit the reserve seasonally, such as the Orange-bellied Parrot. The reserve is sited on the East Asian-Australasian Flyway and is an important feeding ground for international migratory shorebirds in their non-breeding season, such as the Ruddy Turnstone. The area is also a home to Victoria's largest population of hooded plovers, and southern right whales and dolphins may appear in the reserve's waters.

The reserve retains strong cultural heritage values for the Gunditjmara people. Remains of the legendary Mahogany Ship are purported to be located within the reserve. Ever-changing seascapes and sweeping beaches make Belfast Coastal Reserve a popular destination for holiday makers and overseas visitors.

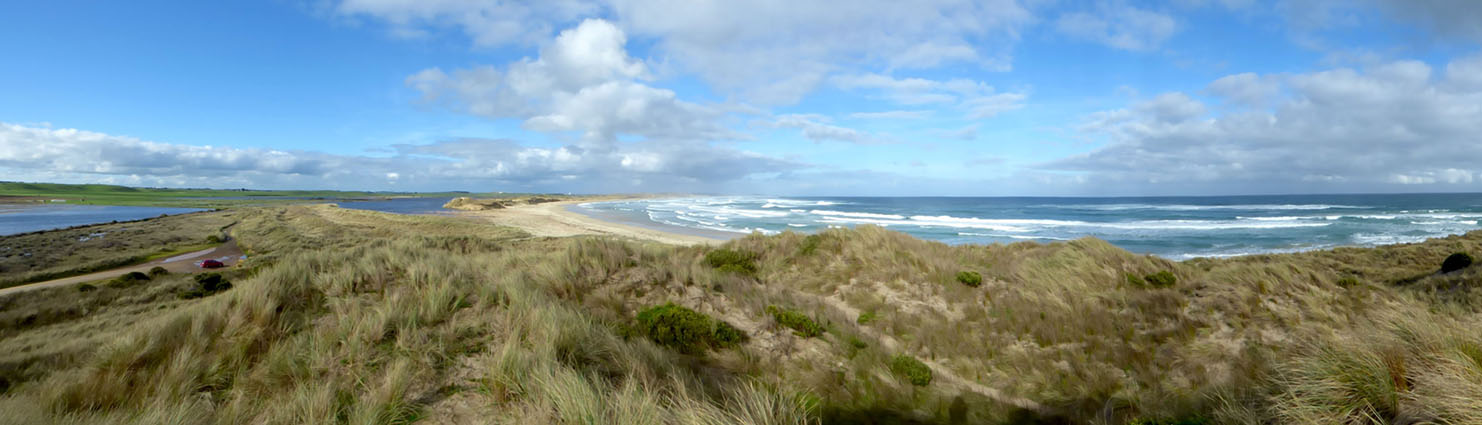
Rutledges Cutting, the western outlet of the Merri River
