= Notorious (ship) =

Replica of a fifteenth-century caravel

Notorious is a replica fifteenth-century caravel. The ship took ten years to build, made entirely from reclaimed timber. It was launched at Martins Point, Port Fairy, Victoria, Australia, on 7 February 2011. Notorious was fitted with sails and conducted its first week-long journey from Port Fairy to Geelong in January 2012.

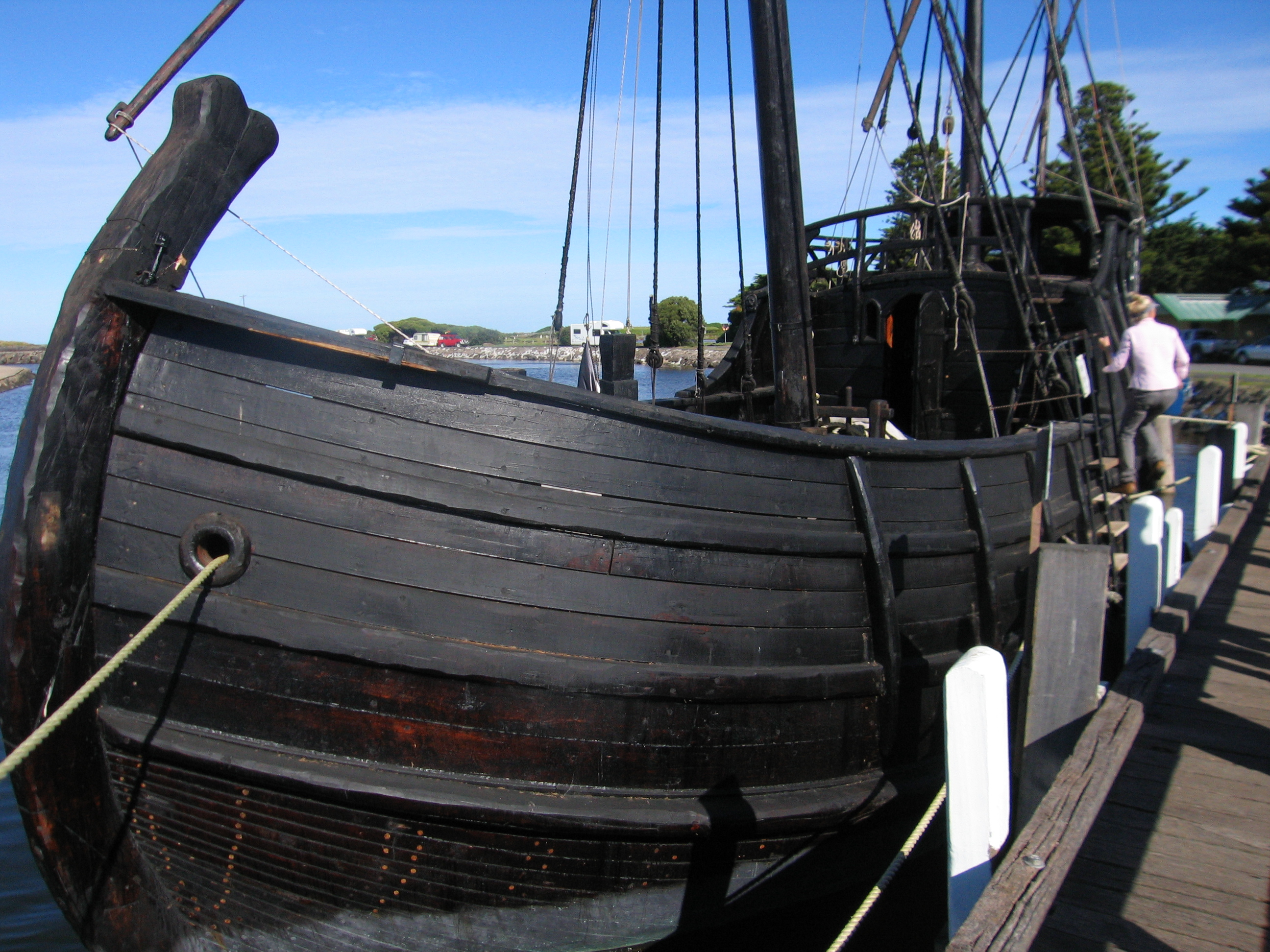
Notorious looking from the bow, while docked at Port Fairy in April 2011

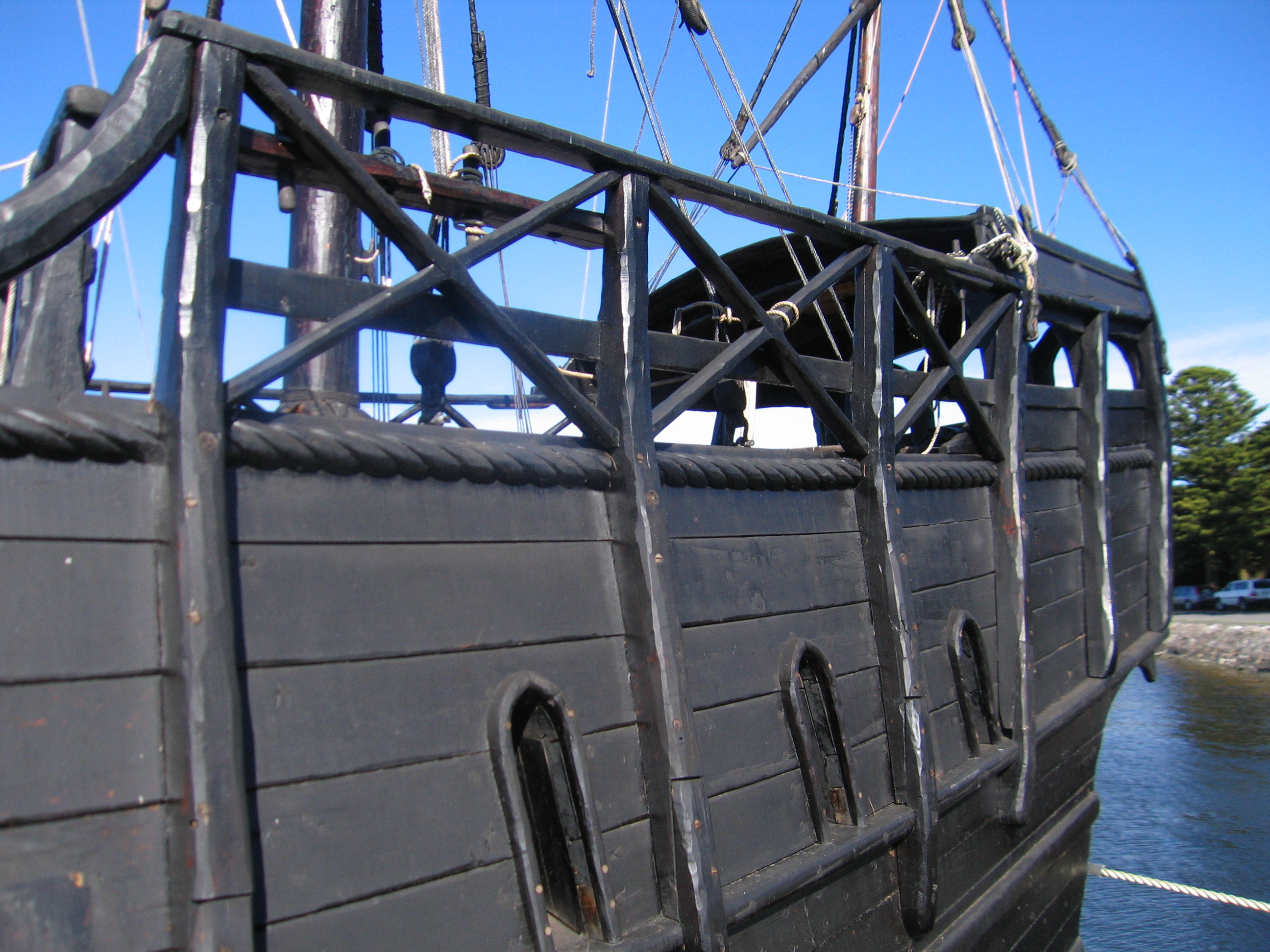
Notorious looking aft

== Design and construction ==
Notorious is a full-size, wooden sailing ship, a re-creation of a caravel, c1500. Notorious was researched, designed, and constructed single-handedly from reclaimed timber by Graeme Wylie, at his home at Bushfield, near Warrnambool, Victoria, Australia. The ship's keelson was laid in April 2002. The keelson is an ironbark beam salvaged from the viaduct, at the Warrnambool Breakwater. The ship's frames were completed towards the end of 2003. By 2008, the ship was opened to the public at the construction site, while the planking was still being completed. The ship was launched at Martin's Point, Port Fairy, on 7 February 2011.

Notorious was constructed of reclaimed Monterey cypress (Cupressus macrocarpa) with a displacement of 58 tonnes. The ship is 17.5 metres in length overall, has a beam of 5.5 metres, and a draught of 2.1 metres. The vessel is lateen rigged, making it Australia's only operational lateen-rigged ship. The interior is an authentic period design, including a cooking fire. The ship has modern GPS navigation, a diesel engine and some other modern conveniences, all hidden behind timber panels.

== Inspiration ==
The Mahogany Ship, a shipwreck first seen by Europeans in 1836, partly buried in sand dunes between Warrnambool and Port Fairy, and last seen in 1886, was part of the inspiration for Wylie. Several writers have claimed the Mahogany Ship was a Portuguese caravel that sailed from Batavia in 1520, down the eastern Australian seaboard and into Bass Strait, before entering the Southern Ocean.

Caravels were a revolutionary design in ship evolution, being the first European vessels with a transom, with the steerboard taken to the rear of the ship. These ships were rigged with the lateen sail, a sail in widespread use in the Mediterranean Sea since Roman times.

== Operational history ==
Her maiden voyage, in January 2012, was from Port Fairy, through Bass Strait, to Port Phillip Bay. Since then, Notorious has sailed over 20,000 nautical miles between the Southern Ocean, Bass Strait, the Tasman and Coral Seas. Notorious is owned and operated by Seadog Sailing Inc, visiting Queensland ports. As a museum ship, it is also open for onboard and below deck Inspection. Notorious is the only sailing caravel in the Southern Hemisphere.
