= Ken McIntyre =

Ken McIntyre may refer to:

- Kenneth McIntyre, Australian lawyer and historian
- Makanda Ken McIntyre, American jazz musician and composer
