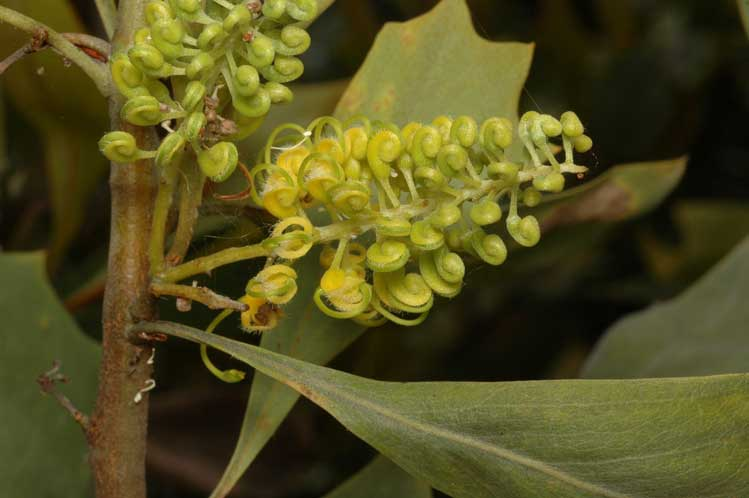
- In the Hunter Region Botanic Gardens

Conservation status
- Least Concern (IUCN 3.1)

Scientific classification
- Kingdom: Plantae
- Clade: Embryophytes
- Clade: Tracheophytes
- Clade: Spermatophytes
- Clade: Angiosperms
- Clade: Eudicots
- Order: Proteales
- Family: Proteaceae
- Genus: Grevillea
- Species: G. agrifolia

Binomial name
- Grevillea agrifolia A.Cunn. ex R.Br.

Subspecies
- Grevillea agrifolia subsp. agrifolia; Grevillea agrifolia subsp. microcarpa

= Grevillea agrifolia =

Blue grevillea

Species of plant native to Australia

Grevillea agrifolia, the blue grevillea, is a species of flowering plant in the family Proteaceae and is native to the north of Western Australia and parts of the Northern Territory. It is a shrub or tree with narrowly oblong leaves with the narrower end towards the base, and creamy-yellow flowers.

== Description ==
Grevillea agrifolia is a shrub or tree that typically grows to a height of 1–4.5 mm (0.039–0.177 in). Its leaves are egg-shaped with the narrower end towards the base to more or less round, 50–160 mm (2.0–6.3 in) long and 20–55 mm (0.79–2.17 in) wide, usually with a few triangular teeth or lobes on the edges. The flowers are green in the bud stage, creamy yellow as they open, and are arranged in dense clusters on the ends of branches or in leaf axils on a flowering stem 20–55 mm (0.79–2.17 in) long. The perianth is glabrous on the outside, but bearded after the flowers open and the pistil is 13.5–20 mm (0.53–0.79 in) long. Flowering occurs from March to September and the fruit is an oblong to more or less spherical follicle 11–24 mm (0.43–0.94 in) long.

== Taxonomy ==
Grevillea agrifolia was first formally described in 1830 in Robert Brown's from an unpublished description by Allan Cunningham and the description was published in Supplementum primum prodromi florae Novae Hollandiae. The specific epithet (agrifolia) means "wounded leaves", referring to the type specimens.

In 2000, Robert Owen Makinson described two subspecies of G. agrifolia and the names are accepted by the Australian Plant Census:

- Grevillea agrifolia A.Cunn. ex R.Br. subsp. agrifolia has leaves 40–95 mm (1.6–3.7 in) wide and follicles 18–24 mm (0.71–0.94 in) long;
- Grevillea agrifolia subsp. microcarpa (Olde & Marriott) Makinson has leaves 10–40 mm (0.39–1.57 in) wide and follicles 18–24 mm (0.71–0.94 in) long.

Grevillea microcarpa was first formally described in 1993 by Peter M. Olde and Neil R. Marriott in the journal Telopea but in 2000 was reduced to G. agrifolia subsp. microcarpa by Makinson in the Flora of Australia.

== Distribution and habitat ==
Blue grevillea grows in rocky places in coastal areas and near water in the Kimberley region of Western Australia and in the Victoria River district in the Northern Territory. Subspecies microcarpa is restricted to the area between Napier Broome Bay and the King Edward and Drysdale Rivers in the northern Kimberley region.

== Conservation status ==
Grevillea agrifolia is listed as least concern on the IUCN Red List of Threatened Species, due to it being a common, widespread species with no known current or near future substantial threats.
