= Theory of the Portuguese discovery of Australia =

Generally unaccepted theory of Portuguese discovery of Australia

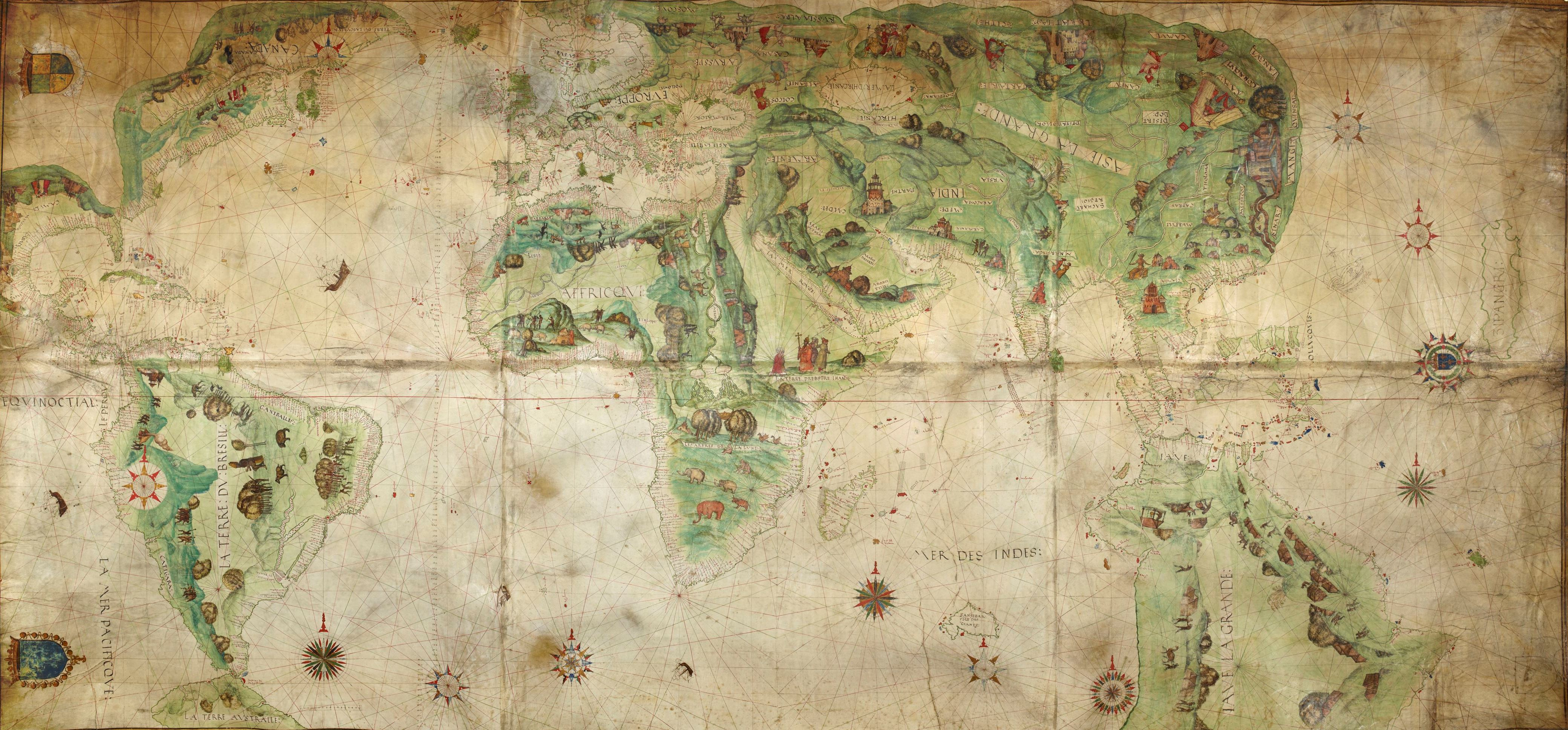
The Harleian Mappemonde, British Library, Add. MS 5413. Copy held by the National Library of Australia.

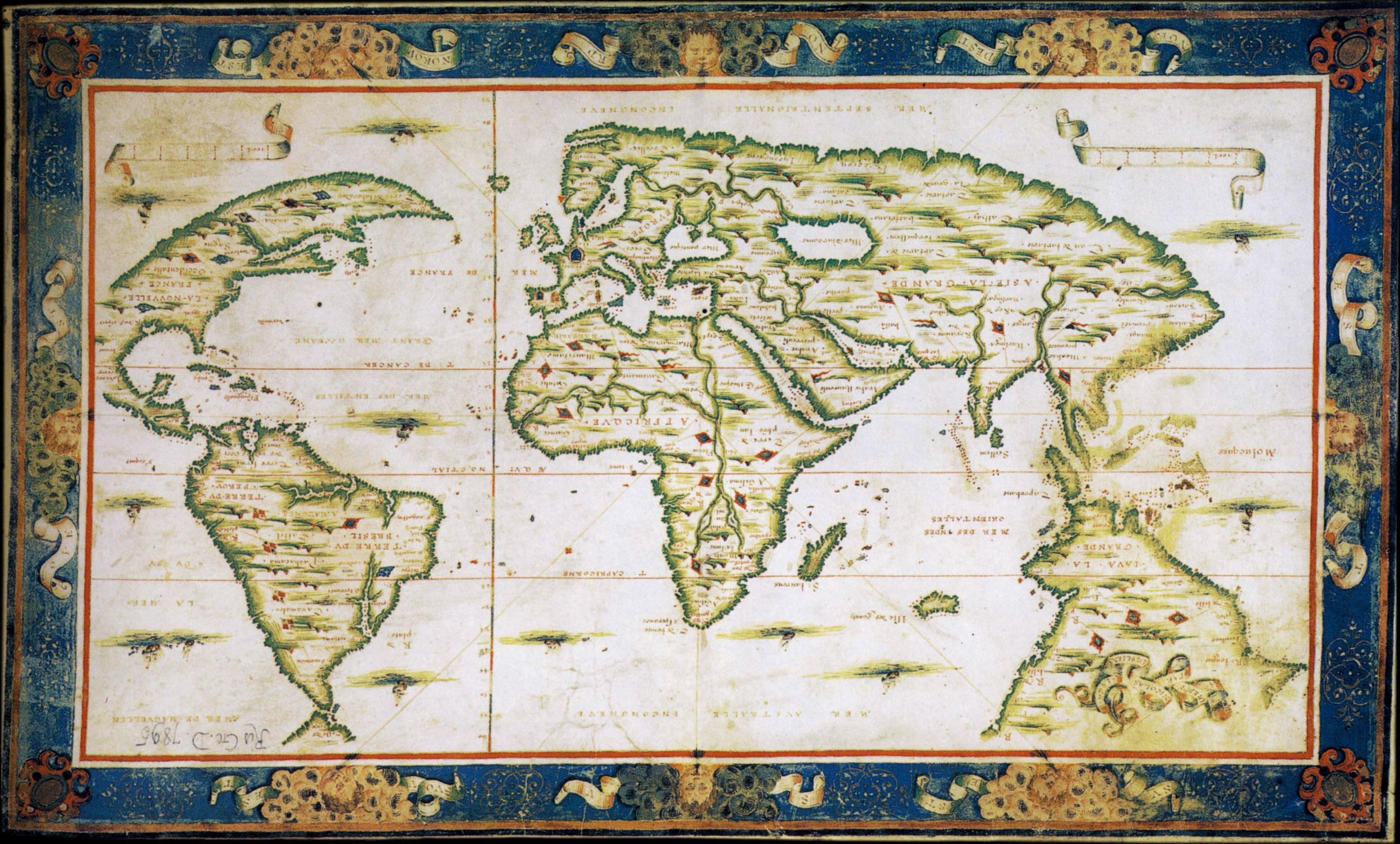
World map of Nicolas Desliens (1566), part of the Dieppe Maps, Bibliothèque Nationale de France, Paris

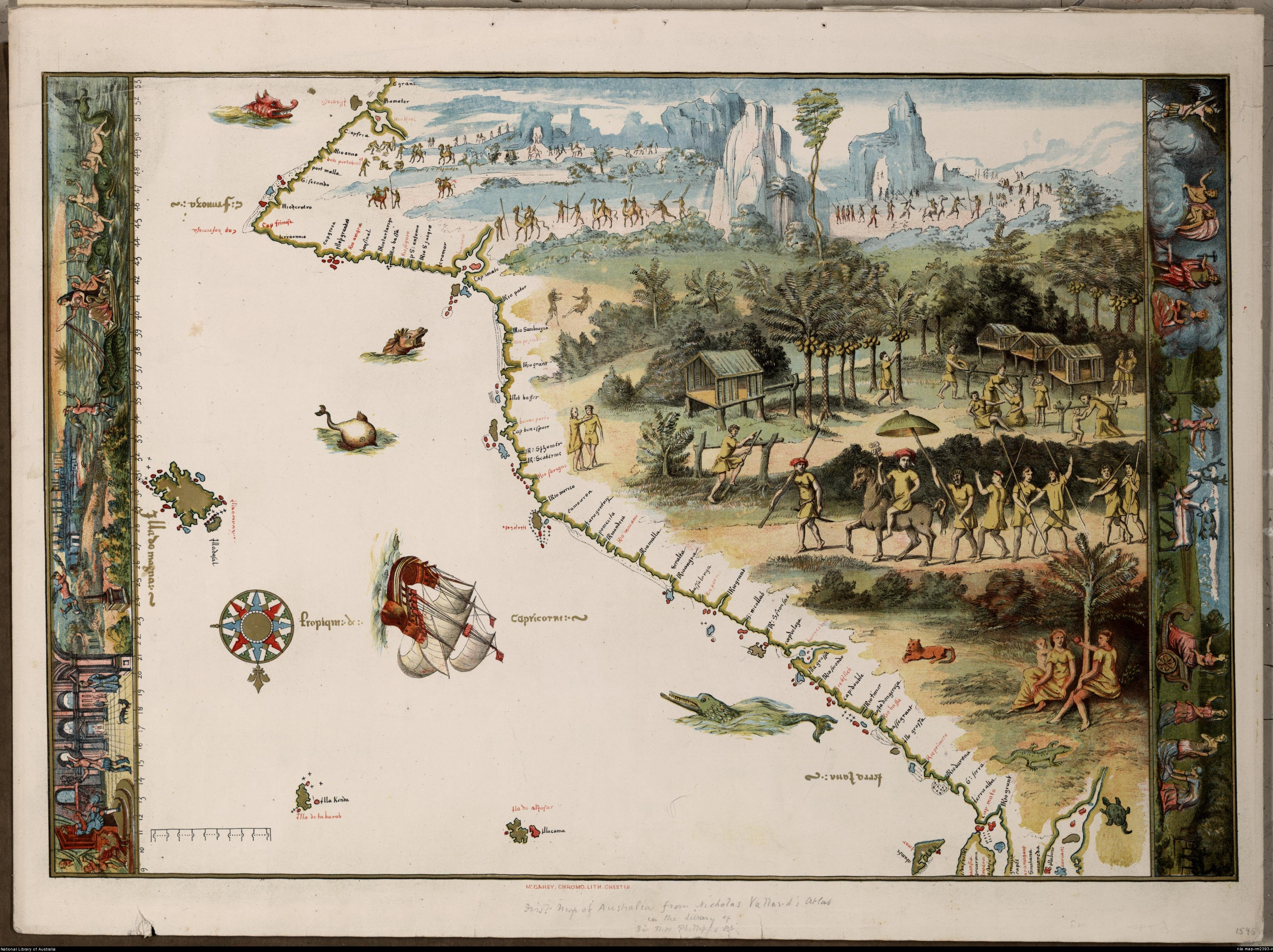
Jave la Grande's east coast: from Nicholas Vallard atlas, 1547. This is part of an 1856 copy of one of the Dieppe Maps. Copy held by the National Library of Australia.

The south eastern section of Map of La Terre Australle Desceliers, showing Portuguese discoveries along the east coast of Australia in the early 1500s

According to the theory of the Portuguese discovery of Australia, early Portuguese navigators were the first Europeans to sight Australia, between 1521 and 1524, well before the arrival of the Dutch navigator, Willem Janszoon, in 1606 on board the Duyfken, who is generally considered to be the first European discoverer. While lacking generally accepted evidence, this theory is based on the following:

- The Dieppe maps, a group of 16th-century French world maps, depict a large landmass between Indonesia and Antarctica. Labelled as Java la Grande, this landmass carries French, Portuguese, and Gallicized Portuguese placenames, and has been interpreted by some as corresponding to Australia's northwestern and eastern coasts.

The proximity of Portuguese colonies in Southeast Asia from c. 1513–1516, particularly Portuguese Timor, which is approximately 650 kilometres (400 mi) from the Australian coast.

- Various antiquities found on Australian coastlines, claimed by some to be relics of early Portuguese voyages to Australia but which are generally regarded as evidence of Makassan visit to Northern Australia.

Precedence for earliest non-Aboriginal visits to Australia has also been claimed for China (Admiral Zheng), France, (Note: Credit for the discovery of Australia was given to Frenchman Binot Paulmier de Gonneville (1504) by Brosses.) Spain, (Note: In the early 20th century, Lawrence Hargrave argued from archaeological evidence that Spain had established a colony in Botany Bay in the 16th century.) and even Phoenicia, also all without generally accepted evidence.

== Historiography ==
=== Development of the theory in the 19th century ===
Although Scotsman Alexander Dalrymple wrote on this topic in 1786, it was Richard Henry Major, Keeper of Maps at the British Museum, who in 1859 first made significant efforts to prove the Portuguese visited Australia before the Dutch. A group of mid-16th-century French maps, the Dieppe maps, formed his main evidence. However, there is widespread agreement today that his approach to historical research was flawed and his claims often exaggerated. Writing in an academic journal in 1861, Major announced the discovery of a map by Manuel Godinho de Eredia, claiming it proved a Portuguese visit to North Western Australia, possibly dated to 1601. In fact, this map's origins are from 1630. On finally locating and examining Erédia's writings, Major realised the planned voyage to lands south of Sumba in Indonesia had never taken place. Major published a retraction in 1873, but his reputation was destroyed. Major's interpretation was examined critically by the Portuguese historian Joaquim Pedro de Oliveira Martins, who concluded that neither the patalie regiã on the 1521 world map of Antoine de La Sale nor the Jave la Grande on the Dieppe Maps was evidence of Australia having been visited by Portuguese visitors in the first quarter of the sixteenth century, but that this feature had found its way on to the maps from descriptions of islands of the Sunda archipelago beyond Java collected from native informants by the Portuguese.

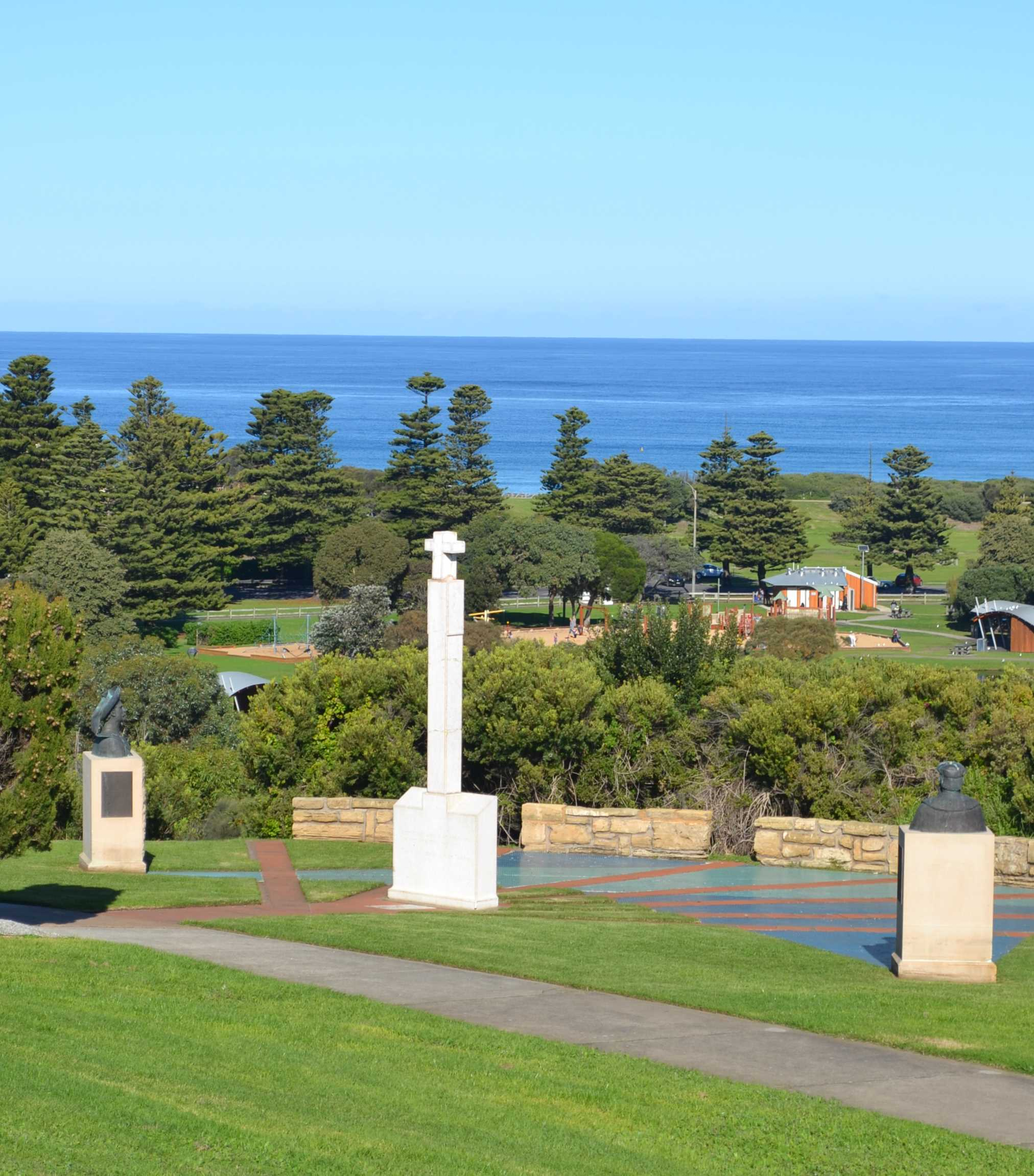
Monument including statues of Vasco Da Gama and Prince Henry the Navigator, at Warrnambool, Victoria

In 1895, George Collingridge produced his The Discovery of Australia, an attempt to trace all European efforts to find the Great Southern Land to the time of Cook, and also introducing his interpretation of the theory of Portuguese visitation of Australia, using the Dieppe maps. Fluent in Portuguese and Spanish, Collingridge was inspired by the publicity surrounding the arrival in Australia of copies of several Dieppe maps, which had been purchased by libraries in Melbourne, Adelaide and Sydney. Despite a number of errors regarding place names, and "untenable" theories to explain misplacement on the Dieppe maps, his book was a remarkable effort considering it was written at a time when many maps and documents were inaccessible and document photography was still in its infancy. Collingridge's theory did not find public approval, however, and Professors G. Arnold Wood and Ernest Scott publicly criticised much of what he had written. Collingridge produced a shorter version of this book for use in New South Wales schools; The First Discovery of Australia and New Guinea. It was not used.

Edward Heawood also provided early criticism of the theory. In 1899 he noted that the argument for the coasts of Australia having been reached early in the 16th century rested almost entirely on the supposition that at that time, "a certain unknown map-maker drew a large land, with indications of definite knowledge of its coasts, in the quarter of the globe in which Australia is placed". He pointed out that "a difficulty arises from the necessity of supposing at least two separate voyages of discovery, one on each coast, though absolutely no record of any such exists". He added: "The difficulty, of course, has been to account for this map in any other way". The delineation of Japan in the Dieppe maps, the insertion in them of an Isle des Géants in the southern Indian Ocean, and of Catigara on the west coast of South America, and in their later versions the depiction of a fictitious coastline of a southern continent with numerous bays and rivers, showed the slight reliance to be placed on them with respect to outlying parts of the world and the influence still exercised on their makers by the old writers". He concluded: "This should surely make us hesitate to base so important assumption as that of a discovery of Australia in the sixteenth century on their unsupported testimony".

=== Kenneth McIntyre and development of the theory in the 20th century ===
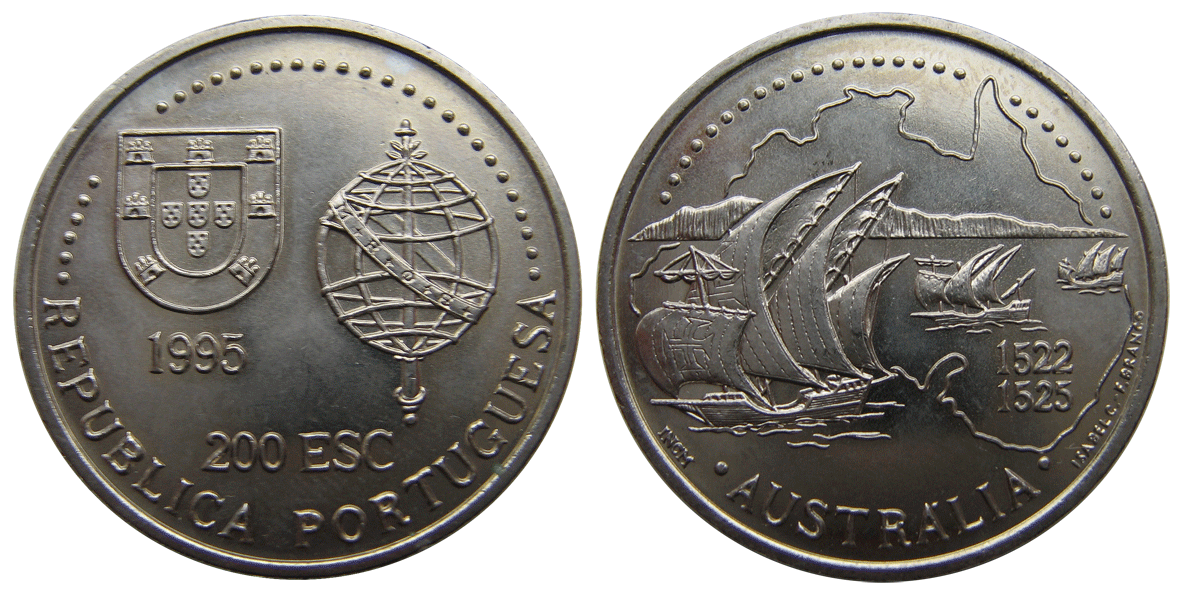
Portuguese 200 escudo coin of 1995 commemorating the claim of discovery

The development of the theory of Portuguese discovery of Australia owes much to Melbourne lawyer Kenneth McIntyre's 1977 book, The Secret Discovery of Australia; Portuguese ventures 200 years before Cook. McIntyre's book was reprinted in an abridged paperback edition in 1982 and again in 1987, and it was found on school history reading lists by the mid-1980s. According to Tony Disney, McIntyre's theory influenced a generation of history teachers in Australian schools. A TV documentary was made of the book in the 1980s by Michael Thornhill and McIntyre, and the theory featured in many positive newspaper reviews and articles over the next twenty years. Australian history school textbooks also reflect the evolution of acceptance of his theories. The support of Helen Wallis, Curator of Maps at the British Library during her visits to Australia in the 1980s seemed to add academic weight to McIntyre's theory. In 1987, the Australian Minister for Science, Barry Jones, launching the Second Mahogany Ship Symposium in Warrnambool, said: "I read Kenneth McIntyre's important book ... as soon as it appeared in 1977. I found its central argument ... persuasive, if not conclusive." The appearance of variant but essentially supporting theories in the late 1970s and early 1980s by other writers, including Ian McKiggan and Lawrence Fitzgerald, also added credence to the theory of Portuguese discovery of Australia. In 1994, McIntyre expressed pleasure that his theory was gaining acceptance in Australia: "It is gradually seeping through. The important thing is that ... it has been on the school syllabus, and therefore students have ... read about it. They in due course become teachers and ... they will then tell their students and so on".

== Purported evidence and arguments ==
=== Interpretation of the Dieppe Maps ===
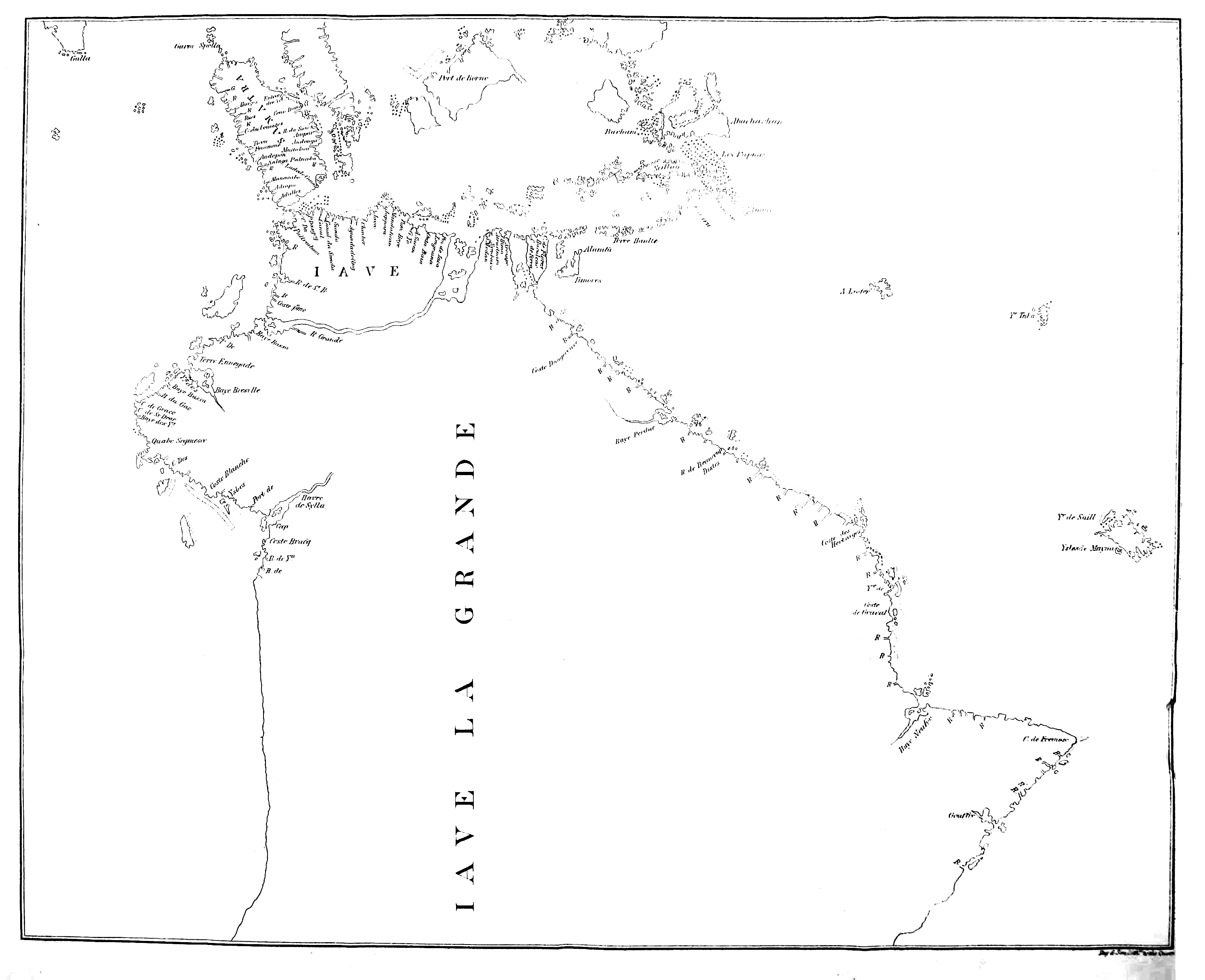
Jave la Grande on the Harleian Mappemonde, as illustrated in Ernest Favenc, The history of Australian exploration from 1788 to 1888, London & Sydney, Griffith, Farran, Okeden & Welsh, Turner & Henderson, 1888

The central plank of the theory of Portuguese discovery of Australia suggests the continent called Jave la Grande, which uniquely appears on a series of 16th-century French world maps, the Dieppe school of maps, represents Australia. Speaking in 1982, Kenneth McIntyre described the Dieppe maps as "the only evidence of Portuguese discovery of Eastern Australia". He stressed this to point out "that the Mahogany Ship, and the Geelong Keys, and other things of that sort, are not part of the proof that the Portuguese discovered Australia. It is the other way around. The Dieppe maps prove (sic) that the Portuguese discovered Australia, and this throws a fierce bright light on our mysteries such as the Mahogany Ship". Later writers on the same topic take the same approach of concentrating primarily on "Jave la Grande" as it appears in the Dieppe maps, including Fitzgerald, McKiggan and most recently, Peter Trickett. Critics of the theory of Portuguese discovery of Australia, including A. Ariel, M. Pearson, W. A. R. Richardson, Gayle K. Brunelle and Robert J. King also concentrate on the "Jave la Grande" landmass of the Dieppe maps (see below).

W. A. R. Richardson argues that Jave la Grande as it appears on the Dieppe world maps is at least partly based on Portuguese sources that no longer exist. McIntyre attributed discrepancies between the Jave la Grande coastline and Australia's to the difficulties of accurately recording positions without a reliable method of determining longitude, and the techniques used to convert maps to different projections.

In the late 1970s, mathematician Ian McKiggan developed his theory of exponential longitude error theory to explain discrepancies, although he modified this position after a public exchange of opinion with W. A. R. Richardson. McIntyre's own theory about distortion of the maps and the calculations used to correct the maps has also been challenged. Both Lawrence Fitzgerald and Peter Trickett argue Jave la Grande is based on Portuguese sea charts, now lost, which the mapmakers of Dieppe misaligned. Both these writers try to compare the coastal features of Jave la Grande with modern Australia's, by realigning them.

In 1994, McIntyre suggested that the writings of Pedro Nunes supported his interpretation of the distortion that occurred on the Dieppe Maps.

Helen Wallis, Keeper of Maps at the British Museum, referred in 1988 to the interpretation "explosion" on the subject of the Dieppe maps. She herself argued the case for discovery of Australia by "a local Portuguese voyage otherwise unknown" seventy years before the Dutch, a chart of which was "presumably" brought back to Dieppe by the survivors of a French voyage to Sumatra led by Jean Parmentier in 1529–30.

=== Cristóvão de Mendonça's role ===
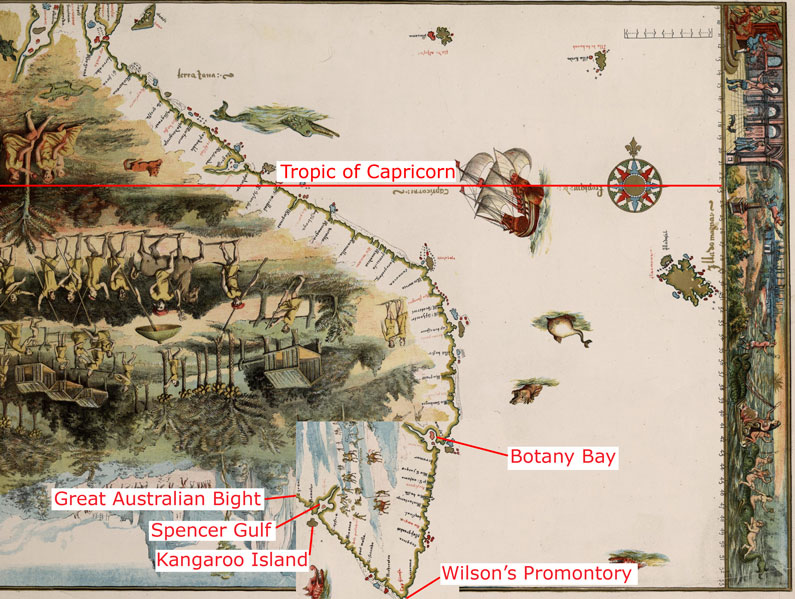
The Vallard map, with part of it rotated at 90 degrees, and the claimed locations by Peter Trickett in Beyond Capricorn

Cristóvão de Mendonça is known from a small number of Portuguese sources, notably the famous Portuguese historian João de Barros in Décadas da Ásia (Decades of Asia), a history of the growth of the Portuguese Empire in India and Asia, published between 1552 and 1615. Mendonça appears in Barros' account with instructions to search for the legendary Isles of Gold. However, Mendonça and other Portuguese sailors are then described as assisting with the construction of a fort at Pedir (Sumatra) and Barros does not mention the expedition again.

McIntyre nominated Cristóvão de Mendonça as the commander of a voyage to Australia c. 1521–1524, one he argued had to be kept secret because of the 1494 Treaty of Tordesillas, which divided the undiscovered world into two-halves for Portugal and Spain. Barros and other Portuguese sources do not mention a discovery of land that could be Australia, but McIntyre conjectured this was because original documents were lost in the 1755 Lisbon earthquake, (Note: However, a significant library of Portuguese discovery maps and documents still exists in Goa.) or the official policy of silence. (Note: Laurence Bergreen asserts that if Magellan had sailed for his homeland Portugal, his voyage may have been lost to posterity. By an edict of the Portuguese king in 1504, it was punishable by death to disclose any discoveries or plans of exploration. Between 1500 ad 1550 there were no publications in Portugal relating to discoveries by Portugal.)

Most proponents of the theory of Portuguese discovery of Australia have supported McIntyre's hypothesis that it was Mendonça who sailed down the eastern Australian coast and provided charts which found their way onto the Dieppe maps, to be included as "Jave la Grande" in the 1540, 1550s and 1560s. McIntyre claimed the maps indicated Mendonça went as far south as Port Fairy, Victoria; Fitzgerald claims they show he went as far as Tasmania; Trickett states as far as Spencer Gulf in South Australia, and New Zealand's North Island.

=== Claims of Portuguese words in Aboriginal Australian languages ===
In the 1970s and 1980s, linguist Carl Georg von Brandenstein, approaching the theory from another perspective, claimed that 60 words used by Aboriginal people of the Australian north-west had Portuguese origins. According to Peter Mühlhäusler of the University of Adelaide:

Von Brandenstein discusses a number of words in Pilbara [Aboriginal Australian] languages which show some resemblances with Portuguese (and Latin) words, and concludes that perhaps fifteen out of a total of sixty might be borrowings from either Portuguese or Latin. The most convincing is the word for 'turtle' in various Pilbara languages including Ngarluma, Karierra, Ngarla, Yinjibarndi, and Nyamal, which is "tartaruga" or "thartaruga" – the former being identical to the Portuguese word for this animal. Such borrowings must presumably date to the early Portuguese interception of the Pilbara coast, and indicate that the Portuguese did communicate with the Aboriginal people of the Pilbara coast. Again, however, there is no evidence that the contacts were intensive or extensive enough to give rise to any contact language.

Von Brandenstein also claimed the Portuguese had established a "secret colony ... and cut a road as far as the present day town of Broome" and that "stone housing in the east Kimberley could not have been made without outside influence". However, according to Nicholas Thieberger, modern linguistic and archaeological research has not corroborated his arguments. Mühlhäusler agrees, stating that "von Brandenstein's evidence is quite unconvincing: his historical data is speculative – the colonisation being clandestine, there are no written records of it and his claims are not supported by the linguistic evidence he cites."

=== Other purported textual and cartographic evidence ===
In contemporary Australia, reports of textual and cartographic evidence, of varying significance, and occasionally artifacts are sometimes cited as likely to "rewrite" Australian History because they suggest a foreign presence in Australia. In January 2014, a New York Gallery listed a sixteenth-century Portuguese manuscript for sale, one page of which contained marginalia of an unidentified animal that the Gallery suggested might be a kangaroo. Martin Woods of the National Library of Australia commented: "The likeness of the animal to a kangaroo or wallaby is clear enough, but then it could be another animal in south-east Asia, like any number of deer species.... For now, unfortunately the appearance of a long-eared big-footed animal in a manuscript doesn't really add much." Peter Pridmore of La Trobe University has suggested the marginalia depicts an aardvark.

==== Speculum Orbis Terrae ====
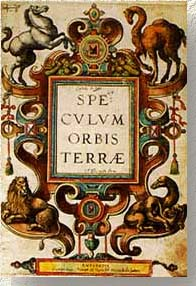
Title page of Speculum Orbis Terrae, an atlas published in 1593. Kenneth McIntyre argues the animal in the bottom right corner is a kangaroo.

Other texts originating from the same era represent a land to the south of New Guinea, with a variety of flora and fauna. Part of a map in Cornelis de Jode's 1593 atlas Speculum Orbis Terrae depicts New Guinea and a hypothetical land to the south inhabited by dragons. Kenneth McIntyre suggested that although Cornelis de Jode was Dutch, the title page of Speculum Orbis Terrae may provide evidence of early Portuguese knowledge of Australia. The page depicts four animals: a horse, representing Europe, a camel, to represent Asia, a lion, for Africa, and another animal that resembles a kangaroo, to represent a fourth continent. The latter creature features a marsupial pouch containing two offspring, and the characteristically bent hind legs of a kangaroo or another member of the macropod family. However, as macropods (including several species of tree-kangaroo, pademelon, dorcopsis, and the agile wallaby) are found in New Guinea and the Aru Islands, this may have no relevance to a possible Portuguese discovery of Australia. Another explanation is that the animal is based on a North American opossum.

==== James Cook and Cooktown harbour ====
On 11 June 1770, James Cook's Endeavour struck a coral reef (now known as Endeavour Reef) off the coast of what is now Queensland. It was a potentially catastrophic event and the ship immediately began to take water. However, over the next four days the ship managed to limp along, searching for safety. In 1976, McIntyre suggested that Cook had been able to find a large harbour (Cooktown harbour) because he had access to a copy of one of the Dieppe maps. McIntyre felt Cook's comment in his Journal, which at the 1982 Mahogany ship Symposium he cited as "this harbour will do excellently for our purposes, although it's not as large as I had been told", indicated he carried a copy of or had seen a copy of the Dauphin Map, and by implication was using it to chart his way along the eastern Australian coast. McIntyre acknowledged in his book that Cook may have been told this by the lookout or boat crew, but added it was a "peculiar remark to make." Reference to this remained in subsequent editions of The Secret Discovery of Australia. (Note: See p. 194 of the 1984 edition for example.)

In 1997, Ray Parkin edited a definitive account of Cook's voyage of 1768–1771, transcribing the Endeavour's original log, Cook's Journal and accounts by other members of the crew. Parkin transcribed the relevant Journal entry as "...anchored in 4 fathom about a mile from the shore and then made a signal for the boats to come on board, after which I went myself and buoy'd the channel which I found very narrow and the harbour much smaller than I had been told but very convenient for our purpose." The log for 14 June also mentions the ship's boats sounding the way for the crippled Endeavour. Nevertheless, the influence of McIntyre's interpretation can still be seen in contemporary Australian school curriculum materials. (Note: See an Australian schools junior secondary curriculum example.)

=== Purported evidence from relics ===
==== Mahogany Ship ====
According to McIntyre, the remains of one of Cristóvão de Mendonça's caravels was discovered in 1836 by a group of shipwrecked whalers while they were walking along the sand dunes to the nearest settlement, Port Fairy. The men came across the wreck of a ship made of wood that appeared to be mahogany. Between 1836 and 1880, 40 people recorded that they had seen an "ancient" or "Spanish" wreck. Whatever it was, the wreck has not been seen since 1880, despite extensive searches in recent times. McIntyre's accuracy in transcribing original documents to support his argument has been criticized by some recent writers. Murray Johns' 2005 survey of 19th-century accounts of the Mahogany Ship suggests that the eyewitness accounts actually relate to more than one shipwreck in the area. Johns concludes these wrecks were of early 19th-century Australian construction and are unrelated to Portuguese maritime activity.

==== The Geelong Keys ====
In 1847, at Limeburners Point, near Geelong, Victoria, Charles La Trobe, a keen amateur geologist, was examining shells and other marine deposits revealed by excavations associated with lime production in the area. A worker showed him a set of five keys he claimed to have found the day before. La Trobe concluded that the keys had been dropped onto what had been the beach around 100–150 years before. Kenneth McIntyre hypothesised they were dropped in 1522 by Mendonça or one of his sailors. Since the keys have been lost, however, their origin cannot be verified.

A more likely explanation is that the "much decayed" keys were dropped by one of the limeburners shortly before being found, as the layer of dirt and shells they were found below was dated as around 2300–2800 years old, making La Trobe's dating implausible. According to geologist Edmund Gill, and engineer and historian Peter Alsop, the error by La Trobe is quite understandable, given that in 1847 most Europeans thought the world was only 6000 years old.

==== Cannon ====
In 1916, two bronze cannon were found on a small island in Napier Broome Bay, on the Kimberly coast of Western Australia. Since the guns were erroneously thought to be carronades, the small island was named Carronade Island.

Kenneth McIntyre believed the cannons gave weight to the theory of Portuguese discovery of Australia. However, scientists at the Western Australian Museum in Fremantle made a detailed analysis of the weapons, and determined that they are swivel guns, and almost certainly of late 18th-century Makassan, rather than European, origin. The claim that one of the guns displays a Portuguese "coat of arms" is incorrect.

In January 2012, a swivel gun found two years before at Dundee Beach near Darwin was widely reported by web news sources and the Australian press to be of Portuguese origin. However, later analysis by the Museum and Art Gallery of the Northern Territory indicated it was also of Southeast Asian origin. Further analysis suggests that the lead in the gun most closely resembles that from Andalusia in Spain, although it may have been recycled in Indonesia. The museum holds seven guns of Southeast Asian manufacture in its collection. Another swivel gun of Southeast Asian manufacture, found in Darwin in 1908, is held by the Museum of South Australia. In 2014, it was revealed that sand inside the Dundee beach gun was dated to 1750.

==== Bittangabee Bay ====
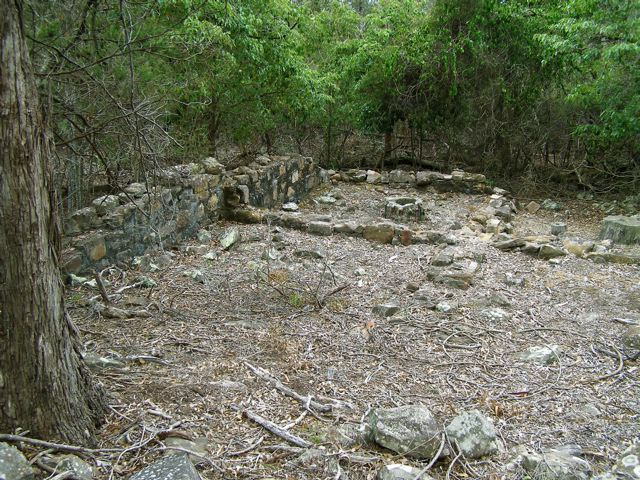
Remains of Bittangabee House, constructed by the Imlay Brothers and abandoned before completion c. 1844. Claimed by Kenneth McIntyre to be Portuguese and by Gavin Menzies as of Chinese construction.

Kenneth McIntyre first suggested in 1977 that the stone ruins at Bittangabee Bay, in Beowa National Park near Eden on the south coast of New South Wales, were of Portuguese origin.

The ruins are the foundations of a building, surrounded by stone rubble that McIntyre argued may have once formed a defensive wall. McIntyre also identified the date 15?4 carved into a stone. McIntyre hypothesized the crew of a Portuguese caravel may have built a stone blockhouse and defensive wall while wintering on a voyage of discovery down Australia's east coast.

Since McIntyre advanced his theory in 1977, significant research on the site has been conducted by Michael Pearson, former Historian for the NSW Parks and Wildlife Service. Pearson identified the Bittangabee Bay ruins as having been built as a store house by the Imlay brothers, early European inhabitants, who had whaling and pastoral interests in the Eden area. The local Protector of Aborigines, George Augustus Robinson, wrote about the commencement of the building in July 1844. The building was left unfinished at the time of the death of two of the three brothers in 1846 and 1847.

Other visitors and writers, including Lawrence Fitzgerald, have been unable to find the 15?4 date. Writing in Beyond Capricorn in 2007, Peter Trickett suggests the date McIntyre saw may be random pick marks in the stonework.

Trickett accepts Pearson's work, but hypothesizes that the Imlays may have started their building on top of a ruined Portuguese structure, thus explaining the surrounding rocks and partly dressed stones. Trickett also suggests the Indigenous Australian name for the area may have Portuguese origins.

==== Kilwa Sultanate coins ====
In 1944, nine coins were found on Marchinbar Island by RAAF radar operator Maurie Isenberg. Four coins were identified as Dutch duits dating from 1690 to the 1780s, while five with Arabic inscriptions were identified as being from the Kilwa Sultanate of east Africa. The coins are now held by the Powerhouse Museum, Sydney. In 2018 another coin, also thought to be from Kilwa, was found on a beach on Elcho Island, another of the Wessel Islands, by archaeologist and member of the Past Masters group, Mike Hermes. Hermes speculated that this may indicate trade between indigenous Australians and Kilwa, or that they coins had arrived as a result of Makassan contact with Australia. Ian S McIntosh's view is also that the coins were "probably introduced by sailors from Makassar... in the first wave of trepanging and exploration in the 1780s."

== Criticisms and alternative views of the Dieppe Maps ==
Possibly because of the degree of conjecture involved in the theory of Portuguese discovery of Australia, there have been a number of critics. Matthew Flinders cast a sceptical eye over the "Great Java" of the Dieppe maps in A Voyage to Terra Australis, published in 1814, and concluded:

it should appear to have been partly formed from vague information, collected, probably, by the early Portuguese navigators, from the eastern nations; and that conjecture has done the rest. It may, at the same time, be admitted, that a part of the west and north-west coasts, where the coincidence of form is most striking, might have been seen by the Portuguese themselves, before the year 1540, in their voyages to, and from, India.

In the last chapter of The Secret Discovery of Australia, Kenneth McIntyre threw down a challenge, stating: "Every critic who seeks to deny the Portuguese discovery of Australia is faced with the problem of providing an alternative theory to explain away the existence of the Dieppe maps. If the Dauphin is not the record of real exploration, then what is it?"

By far the most prolific writer on this theory, and also its most consistent critic, has been Flinders University Associate Professor W.A.R. (Bill) Richardson, who has written 20 articles relating to the topic since 1983. (Note: See a review of Richardson's 2006 book.) Richardson, an academic fluent in Portuguese and Spanish, first approached the Dieppe maps in an effort to prove they did relate to Portuguese discovery of Australia. His criticisms are therefore all the more interesting. He suggests that he quickly realised that there was no connection between the Dieppe maps and modern Australia's coastline:

The case for an early Portuguese discovery of Australia rests entirely on imagined resemblances between the "continent" of Jave La Grande on the Dieppe maps and Australia. There are no surviving Portuguese 16th-century charts showing any trace of land in that area, and there are no records whatsoever of any voyage along any part of the Australian coastline before 1606. Advocates of the Portuguese discovery theory endeavour to explain away this embarrassing lack of direct supporting evidence as being due to two factors: the Portuguese official secrets policy, which must have been applied with a degree of efficiency that is hard to credit, and the 1755 Lisbon earthquake which, they claim, must have destroyed all the relevant archival material.

He dismisses the claim that Cristóvão de Mendonça sailed down the east coast of Australia as sheer speculation, based on voyages about which no details have survived. In the same way, the re-assembling of sections of the "Jave La Grande" coastline so that it fits the straitjacket of the real outline of Australia relies upon a second set of assumptions. He argues taking that approach, "Jave La Grande" could be re-assembled to look like anything.

Another dimension of the argument Richardson advances against the theory relates to methodology. Richardson argues that McIntyre's practice of re-drawing sections of maps in his book was misleading because, in an effort to clarify, he actually omitted crucial features and names that did not support the Portuguese discovery theory.

Richardson's own view is that a study of placenames on "Jave La Grande" identifies it as unmistakably connected to the coasts of southern Java and Indochina. Emeritus Professor Victor Prescott has claimed Richardson "brilliantly demolished the argument that Java la Grande show(s) the east coast of Australia." However, Australian historian Alan Frost has recently written that Richardson's argument that the east coast of Java la Grande was in fact the coast of Vietnam is "so speculative and convoluted as not to be credible".

In 1984, criticism of The Secret Discovery of Australia also came from master mariner Captain A. Ariel, who argued McIntyre had made serious errors in his explanation and measurement of "erration" in longitude. Ariel concluded that McIntyre erred on "all navigational ... counts" and that The Secret Discovery of Australia was a "monumental piece of misinterpretation."

French cartographic historian Sarah Toulouse concluded, in 1998, that it seemed most reasonable to see in la Grande Jave, in the present state of the available sources, the pure product of imagination of a Norman cartographer who formed a school with his compatriots.

In 2005, historian Michael Pearson made the following comment on the Dieppe maps as evidence of a Portuguese discovery of Australia:

If the Portuguese did in fact map the northern, western and eastern coasts, this information was hidden from general knowledge ... The Dieppe maps had no claimed sources, no "discoverer" of the land shown ... and the iconography on the various maps is based on Sumatran animals and ethnography, not the reality of Australia. In this sense the maps did not really expand European knowledge of Australia, the portrayal of "Jave La Grande" having no greater status that any other conjectural portrayal of Terra Australis.

In a recent interpretation of the Dieppe maps, Professor Gayle K. Brunelle of California State University, Fullerton argued that the Dieppe school of cartographers should be seen as acting as propagandists for French geographic knowledge and territorial claims. The decades from about 1535 to 1562 (when the Dieppe school of cartographers flourished) were also the period in which French trade with the New World was at its 16th-century height, in terms of the North Atlantic fish trade, the fur trade, and, most important for the cartographers, the rivalry with the Portuguese for control of the coasts of Brazil and the supplies of lucrative brazilwood. The bright red dye produced from brazilwood replaced woad as the primary dyestuff in the cloth industry in France and the Low Countries. The Dieppe cartographers used the skills and geographic knowledge of Portuguese mariners, pilots and geographers working in France to produce maps meant to emphasize French interests in and dominion over territory in the New World that the Portuguese also claimed, both in Newfoundland and in Brazil. Brunelle noted that, in design and decorative style the Dieppe maps represented a blending of the latest knowledge circulating in Europe with older visions of world geography deriving from Ptolemy and mediaeval cartographers and explorers such as Marco Polo. Renaissance mapmakers such as those based in Dieppe relied heavily on each other's work, as well as on maps from previous generations, and thus their maps represented a mixture of old and new information often coexisting uneasily in the same map.

Academic debate about the Dieppe maps continues into the twenty-first century. In 2019, Professor Brian Lees and Associate Professor Shawn Laffan presented a paper arguing the Jean Rotz 1542 world map is a good "first approximation" of the Australian continent.

Cartographic historian Robert J. King has also written extensively on the subject, arguing that Jave la Grande on the Dieppe maps reflects 16th-century cosmography. In 2010, King received the Australasian Hydrographic Society's Literary Achievement Award for 2010 in recognition of his work on the origins of the Dieppe Maps. In an article published in 2022, based on a presentation made to an international workshop at the Biblioteca Nacional, Lisbon, King said that there was no evidence in Portuguese records and charts of the early 16th century that their navigators discovered Australia. He said that the large southern land, called Jave la Grande, or Terre de Lucac, on the world maps of the Dieppe school of marine cartography, which proponents of an early Portuguese discovery adduced in support, could be explained by setting those maps in the context of the development of cosmographic theory and its cartographic expression from Henricus Martellus to Gerard Mercator, 1491–1569. The southern continent of the Dieppe cartographers, like Mercator's southern continent with its promontory of Beach (Locach), were the product not of actual discovery by French or Portuguese navigators but of imaginative extrapolation from a few mis-identified or misplaced coasts in the southern hemisphere. Following Magellan's expedition of 1519–1522, mis-identification of Marco Polo's Java Minor (Sumatra) with the island of Madura allowed the southern coast of Java Major (Java) to remain undefined, despite the survivors of Magellan's expedition having made their return voyage to Spain by the south of Java (Java Major) rather than through the strait between Madura and Java as was understood from Antonio Pigafetta's account of the voyage. This permitted cartographers to identify Java Major as a promontory of Terra Australis and with Marco Polo's Locach. An adaptation of Oronce Fine's map of 1531 formed the basis of the world maps of Gerardus Mercator and the Dieppe cartographers. With them, the Regio Patalis, shown as a promontory of the Terra Australis on Fine's map, was identified with Marco Polo's Java Major, or Locach (also known as Beach). The ysles de magna and ye. de saill, shown off the east coast of Jave la Grande on the Harleian map, which appear as I. de Mague and I. de Sally on André Thevet's Quarte Partie du Monde, represent the two islands discovered by Magellan during his voyage across the Pacific in 1522, which he called the Desventuradas, or Islas Infortunatos (Unfortunate Isles). The Jave la Grande and Terre de Lucac of the Dieppe maps represented Marco Polo's Java Major and Locach, displaced by the map-makers who misconstrued the information on Southeast Asia and America brought back by Portuguese and Spanish navigators. In a subsequent article, he argues that the Dieppe mapmakers identified Java Major (Jave la Grande) or, in the case of Guillaume Brouscon Locach (Terre de lucac), with Oronce Fine's Regio Patalis.

== See also ==
- History of Australia
- Timeline of Australian history
- Marchinbar Island, location of an early deposit of coins in Australia
- Makassan contact with Australia
- Baijini, a legendary people interpreted by some researchers as pre-Macassan visitors to Arnhem Land

== Sources ==
- Ariel, A. (1984). "Navigating with Kenneth McIntyre: a professional critique". The Great Circle. 6 (2): 135–139.
- Fitzgerald, L. (1984). Java La Grande. Hobart: The Publishers. ISBN 0-949325-00-7.
- Flinders, Matthew (1814). A Voyage to Terra Australis: Undertaken for the Purpose of Completing the Discovery of that Vast Country, and Prosecuted in the Years 1801, 1802, and 1803, in His Majesty's Ship the Investigator. Vol. 1. London: G. Nicol & Son. Wikidata Q19027014.
- Major, Richard Henry, ed. (1859). Early Voyages to Terra Australis, now called Australia: A Collection of Documents, and Extracts from Early Manuscript Maps, Illustrative of the History of Discovery on the Coasts of that Vast Island, from the Beginning of the Sixteenth Century to the Time of Captain Cook. London: Hakluyt Society. OCLC 1548155. OL 13500500M. Wikidata Q19090938.
- McIntyre, Kenneth Gordon (1977). The secret discovery of Australia: Portuguese ventures 200 years before Captain Cook. Medindie: Souvenir Press. ISBN 0285623036. OCLC 906273849.
- McIntyre, Kenneth Gordon (1982). Goodwin, R. (ed.). "Early European Exploration of Australia". Proceedings of the First Australian Symposium on the Mahogany Ship. Warrnambool Institute of Advanced Education. ISBN 0-9599121-9-3.
- Nixon, Bob (2001). "A fresh perspective on the Mahogany Ship" (PDF). The Skeptic. 21 (1, Autumn 2001). Australian Skeptics: 31–36. Archived from the original (PDF) on 4 September 2007.
- Parkin, R. (2003) [1997]. H.M. Bark Endeavour. Carlton, Australia: The Miegunyah Press. ISBN 0-522-85093-6.
- Pearson, Michael (2005). Cresswell, Margaret (ed.). Great Southern Land: The Maritime Exploration of Terra Australis (PDF). Canberra: Department of the Environment and Heritage. ISBN 0-642-55185-5. OCLC 67617194. OL 26818732M. Wikidata Q110529184. Archived from the original (PDF) on 4 October 2023.
- Thieberger, N. (2006). Mc Gregor, W. M. (ed.). "Language is like a carpet; Carl Georg von Brandenstein and Australian languages". Encountering Aboriginal Languages: Studies in the History of Australian Linguistics. Canberra: Pacific Linguistics.
- Trickett, Peter (2007). Beyond Capricorn: How Portuguese Adventurers Secretly Discovered and Mapped Australia and New Zealand 250 Years before Captain Cook. Adelaide: East Street Publications. ISBN 978-0-9751145-9-9. LCCN 2007408437. OL 31777707M. Wikidata Q132705331.
