= Carronade Island =

Island in Western Australia

Location of Carronade Island

Carronade Island lies off the northern (Kimberley) coast of Western Australia (13°56′42″S 126°36′09″E), in Napier Broome Bay. It owes its name to two swivel guns found there in 1916, mistakenly described at the time as carronades.

In July 1916, the Royal Australian Navy cruiser HMAS Encounter entered Napier Broome Bay. On a small island in the bay, a party from the ship found two bronze cannons, protruding from the ground and placed about 1.8 metres (6 ft) apart.

The two bronze guns, of different bore and design but both about one metre in length, were removed to Garden Island Naval dockyard. They were initially interpreted as "part of the armament of a Spanish or Portuguese caravel", a claim also made by writer Kenneth McIntyre in 1977. McIntyre cited the guns as evidence for his theory of Portuguese discovery of Australia and described the cannons as "the most tangible extant link with the first European discovery of Australia".

A detailed report by Jeremy Green of the Western Australian Museum identified both of the weapons as swivel guns. Using metallurgical examination, including X-ray and chemical analysis, the guns have been identified as of late 18th century South East Asian origin and likely to have arrived through Makassan contact with Australia. The claim that the more decorated gun displays a Portuguese "rose and crown" is incorrect.
