= Mahogany Ship =

Hypothesised early Australian shipwreck

The Mahogany Ship is a putative early Australian shipwreck that is believed by some to lie beneath the sand in the Armstrong Bay area, approximately 3 to 6 kilometres (1.9 to 3.7 mi) west of Warrnambool in southwest Victoria, Australia. In many modern accounts it is described as a Portuguese caravel after the wreck was associated with the theory of Portuguese discovery of Australia by Kenneth McIntyre in his 1977 book The Secret Discovery of Australia. The most recent research has questioned this theory and provided other explanations.

Three Mahogany Ship Symposia have been conducted in nearby Warrnambool in 1981, 1987 and 2005, attracting significant public and academic interest and the contributions of Manning Clark, Barry Jones, Kenneth McIntyre, Lawrence Fitzgerald, Ian McKiggan, Bill Richardson, Edmund Gill, Jack Loney and many others.

== Eyewitness accounts ==
While there is no conclusive evidence such a wreck exists today, nineteenth-century accounts of the relic persist both in popular folklore and in publications of varying academic rigour. In the 1980s and 1990s, writers Jack Loney and Ian McKiggan documented the accounts of a number of purported nineteenth century eyewitnesses to the wreck. While these were of varying degrees of detail, they indicate a strong local tradition about the wreck in the area. Commenting on the surge of interest in the wreck that appeared at the end of the nineteenth century, Loney observed that research on the wreck was often based around "loosely written words, sometimes presented from hearsay, sometimes from people who could barely read or write, and in most cases from some recalling memories forty or fifty years old." McKiggan took a more liberal view, sharing the opinion of well-known local historian Jack Powling, who wrote "When people knew it, and could see it, they called it 'The Old Wreck;' it was only after it disappeared... that it was given the romantic and slightly misleading name of 'The Mahogany Ship.' Much has been written about it, and much of what has been written has been frankly a good deal of nonsense... Legend by now it may be, but the Old Wreck is no myth..." In 2005, Murray Johns also documented the nineteenth century eyewitnesses to the wreck, but found they fell into three distinct groups – those who placed the wreck in the sea, a second group who said it was on the beach, a third group who identified it as high up in the sand dunes. This has led Johns to conclude the accounts were describing three separate wrecks.

The earliest documented account of a wreck in the area was carried by a Portland newspaper article of 1847 which described "a wreck, about two miles on the Belfast side of Warrnambool…of…a three hundred ton vessel …thrown completely into the [sand] hummocks". The article went on to connect the wreck to the 1841 discovery of a number of articles of French manufacture found strewed along the beach. In 1981, writer Ian McKiggan also found further evidence of an 1841 French shipwreck in the area in the journal of Government Surveyor C.J. Tyers. Tyers wrote that the wreckage (including a keg containing a boat compass by maker Devot of Havre) indicated an unknown French whaler had been lost in the area.

Researcher Jenny Williams Fawcett describes the "1836 Hopkins River Incident" as a foundation myth of the Mahogany Ship story. A popular version of this story was included in The Book of the Bush by George Dunderdale, in 1898, as follows:

In January, 1836, Captain Smith, who was in charge of the whaling station at Port Fairy, went with two men, named Wilson and Gibbs, in a whale boat to the islands near Warrnambool, to look for seal. They… found the mouth of the river Hopkins. In trying to land there, their boat capsized in the surf... [They] succeeded in reaching the shore naked, and they travelled back along the coast to Port Fairy... On this journey they found the wreck of a vessel, supposed to be a Spanish one, which has since been covered by the drifting sand. When Captain Mills was afterwards harbour master at Belfast, he took the bearings of it…. Vain search was made for it many years afterwards in the hope that it was a Spanish galleon laden with doubloons.

According to Jenny Fawcett, Dunderdale was merely repeating an account provided by David Fermaner, who also had not seen the wreck. As Fawcett notes, Captain Mills never wrote of a buried wreck himself, although he was central to various tellings of the story. Fawcett also dismisses the widely cited accounts of local whaler Hugh Donnelly, who claimed to have been a part of the 1836 incident. Fawcett's research indicates Donnelly did not actually arrive in the area until 1843.

A letter to the editor of The Argus in April, 1890, quotes 'a sight-bearing' of the wreck taken by Captain Mills, and supplied to the writer by 'Mr. J.A. Lynar, of Queen-street, Melbourne'. It reads:

Well to the eastward of Gorman's-lane, proceed eastward along the beach till you bring the point of land on which the old iron church stood in line with the highest point of Tower Hill Island. The wreck would be almost in straight line with those objects well in the hummocks."

Another letter, from 1910, quoted a resident who rented a farm in the area in 1853 when the ship was said to be still readily visible and he could 'ride into its interior'. His location was:

...starting from Dennington [near Warrnambool] and going past two conspicuous high sandhills on the west side of the Merri River, the wreck being nearly in line with them... there was another wreck about two miles further west, near Gorman's-lane, but it was a modern ship as far as he could judge and he thinks that that is the wreck which Captain Mills visited and described as lying south-east of Tower Hill."

In the opinion of Johns, Captain John Mason of Port Fairy was the first to describe the ship as being constructed of a dark timber which had the appearance of cedar or mahogany, in a letter to the Melbourne Argus on 1 April 1876. Mason clarified his account in The Australasian on 1 November 1890, expressing uncertainty about the provenance of the ship and stating that he did not think it was made of mahogany, however, by this time the title Mahogany Ship had already become the popular name for the wreck, thanks to the work of journalist John Stanley James (also known as "The Vagabond").

== Searches for the wreck ==
Joseph Archibald, curator of the Warrnambool Museum, made strenuous efforts to document accounts and stimulate local interest in the wreck in the early 1890s. In June 1890, Archibald led the first organised search for the wreck. In July, former whaler Hugh Donnelly led another search, using bearings Captain John Mills was alleged to have given a friend. In November, the Victorian Government sponsored another search. In 1891, Archibald delivered a paper entitled "Ancient Wreck at Warrnambool", to the Royal Geographical Society, and this appears to mark the end of his active involvement. In 1910, having conducted further research, George Gordon McCrae also delivered a paper to the Geographical Society.

Further searches have been conducted since the 1980s, coinciding with the publication of Kenneth McIntyre's book and the Mahogany Ship symposia, conducted in nearby Warrnambool. These were conducted with the support of local authorities, businesses and volunteer organisations such as the National Trust. To date, however, nothing has been found to verify the popular Portuguese theory. Analysis of a number of artefacts alleged to be from the wreck were discussed by Rev. John Pinson in 1987. These include a ruler and two penholders, supposedly made from timber of the wreck. In both cases the wood has been identified as native to northern New South Wales or Queensland. A fragment of wood from the collection of Joseph Archibald, held by the National Library, Canberra has been identified as eucalyptus. An unusual amphora found on the beach in 1943 has been identified as of nineteenth century North African origin. In 2000, a two-metre length of European white oak was uncovered in the sand dunes. However, its shape and state indicated it was probably part of a shipment of white oak being carried on the sailing vessel Falls of Halladale, which was wrecked at Peterborough in the early twentieth century.

== Theories regarding the Mahogany Ship ==
In many of the accounts written in the late 19th century, the Mahogany Ship was described as Spanish. According to local writer and antiquarian Jack Loney, several theories supporting the Spanish connection were advanced. One theory was that the ship was the galleon "Santa Ysabel", which had sailed from Peru in 1595. A second theory was that the wreck was the ex-Spanish ship Santa Anna. This is clearly incorrect as Santa Anna wrecked in 1811 in the Straits of Timor.

Today, a popular theory suggests that the vessel is a missing ship of voyage of Portuguese exploration, wrecked in 1522. Kenneth McIntyre advanced this theory in 1977, as part of his theory of Portuguese discovery of Australia. According to McIntyre the Mahogany Ship was part of a secret expedition, under Cristóvão de Mendonça, that set out from the Spice Islands in 1522 to look for the Isles of Gold. McIntyre argued secrecy would have been essential because the mariners were entering waters deemed Spanish under the Treaty of Tordesillas. He suggested that, after discovering the north coast of Australia, they followed and charted it and continued down the east coast and around Cape Howe, before one of the caravels was wrecked at Warrnambool. The other ships turned back and returned to the Spice Islands and then Portugal. Maps and documents of such a voyage were kept locked away in Portugal so as to avoid antagonising Spain and to keep the discoveries from her or other nations. McIntyre suggested that all of the original documents have since been lost or destroyed, except for references to Jave la Grande, which appear on the French Dieppe school of maps. Lawrence Fitzgerald also supported McIntyre's theory connecting the Mahogany ship to a Portuguese voyage in his 1984 book, Java La Grande. However, Peter Trickett's 2007 book on the theory of Portuguese discovery of Australia, Beyond Capricorn, found fault with McIntyre's interpretation of the Mahogany ship as a caravel, and noted that until the wreck is found, "all theories must remain to some degree speculative." Bob Nixon (2001) and Murray Johns (2005) have both criticised McIntyre's account for adding confusion to the story of the Mahogany ship through his identification of the wreck as a caravel and his selection and transcription of evidence.

In 2002, the debunked pseudohistorian Gavin Menzies speculated that the ship was a modified Chinese junk. He pointed to the reports that it was made of a 'dark wood' and was 'of an unconventional design'. He also claimed that local Aborigines had a tradition that "yellow men" had at one time come from the wreck. The claims of Chinese origin have not been supported in academic circles and, as with Menzies' other claims, many notable historians have dismissed the notion as fiction.

In 2005, The Age newspaper reported Canberra mathematician Frank Coningham's claim that in the 1980s he had seen a document in a collection of British Parliamentary Papers showing British authorities "dismantled the wreck to prevent an Australian land claim by the King of Portugal." However, Sydney archaeologist Denis Gojak has also investigated the claim and searched British Parliamentary papers. He has been unable to find such a document and doubts its existence as reported.

Murray Johns' theory is that the Mahogany Ship was an incomplete vessel probably built by escaped Tasmanian convicts. He argues they may have arrived on the schooner Unity in 1813, which was wrecked or beached nearby. In his view, this theory explains the repeated nineteenth century references to several unidentified wrecks in different locations in the area. It also accounts for the finds of wood from northern New South Wales (where the Unity had been built), and the nineteenth century descriptions of the Mahogany Ship as crude construction.

== In fiction ==
In the novel Recollections of Geoffry Hamlyn by Henry Kingsley, published in 1859, there is a fictional account of a wreck that resembled the Mahogany Ship. In the book the ship is described as being Dutch or Spanish. In some editions a footnote at the bottom of the page reads: "Such a ship may be seen in the eastern end of Portland Bay, near the modern town of Port Fairy." To what extent the reference in this novel helped to promote the popular image of the wreck is uncertain. Murray Johns believes the footnote is a reference to the well documented wreck of the cedar built Schooner Sally Ann in Portland Bay. He also argues Thomas Clark's 1860 "Mahogany Ship" painting shows the Sally Ann, the painting's title being adopted later.

Wrack (1997), the first novel by Australian writer James Bradley, uses a wreck inspired by the Mahogany Ship as background to a murder mystery.

"The Mahogany Ship" is a novel by Samuel Ridley published in 2025. The novel explores the mythological shipwreck through the perspectives of 16th Century Portuguese sailors under Captain Mendonca, the indigenous Peek Whuurong people, invaders and colonists, and modern Australians.

== Recent events ==
In 1992 the State Government of Victoria offered a reward of A$250,000 to anyone who could locate the wreck but the offer was withdrawn in 1993 without money having been paid.

In July 1999, shipwreck searcher Des Williams discovered wood fragments buried under the sand dunes in the area the ship was supposed to have been seen. These were found to be white oak, which was a 'common shipbuilding timber' in the United States and Europe and, while from the Northern Hemisphere, could have been from the wreck of a different vessel.

Extensive searches of the area were again conducted in late 1999 and in 2004, using heavy drills that penetrated to a depth of 10 metres.

In 2011, Rob Simpson used old accounts, especially of the 19th century search expedition by Alexander Rollo, to try to locate the vessel. He applied aerial archaeology techniques using Google Earth to identify what 'certainly seems to be a clear correlation between the coordinates and the outline vaguely visible' of a ship.

Today, visitors frequently take to the Mahogany Ship Walking Track, which follows the coast between Warrnambool and Port Fairy and passes possible sites where the Mahogany Ship may rest. The area of greatest interest to contemporary researchers is Armstrong Bay east of Gorman's Road (formerly Lane) and west of Levy's Point near Dennington.

A replica caravel inspired by the Mahogany Ship, named the Notorious, was launched at Port Fairy in 2011.

== See also ==
- Australian folklore
- Dieppe Maps
- Geelong Keys
- Kenneth McIntyre
- Theory of Portuguese discovery of Australia
- Lost Ship of the Desert
