= Science Museum of the University of Coimbra =

Coordinates: 40.2102°N 8.4237°W

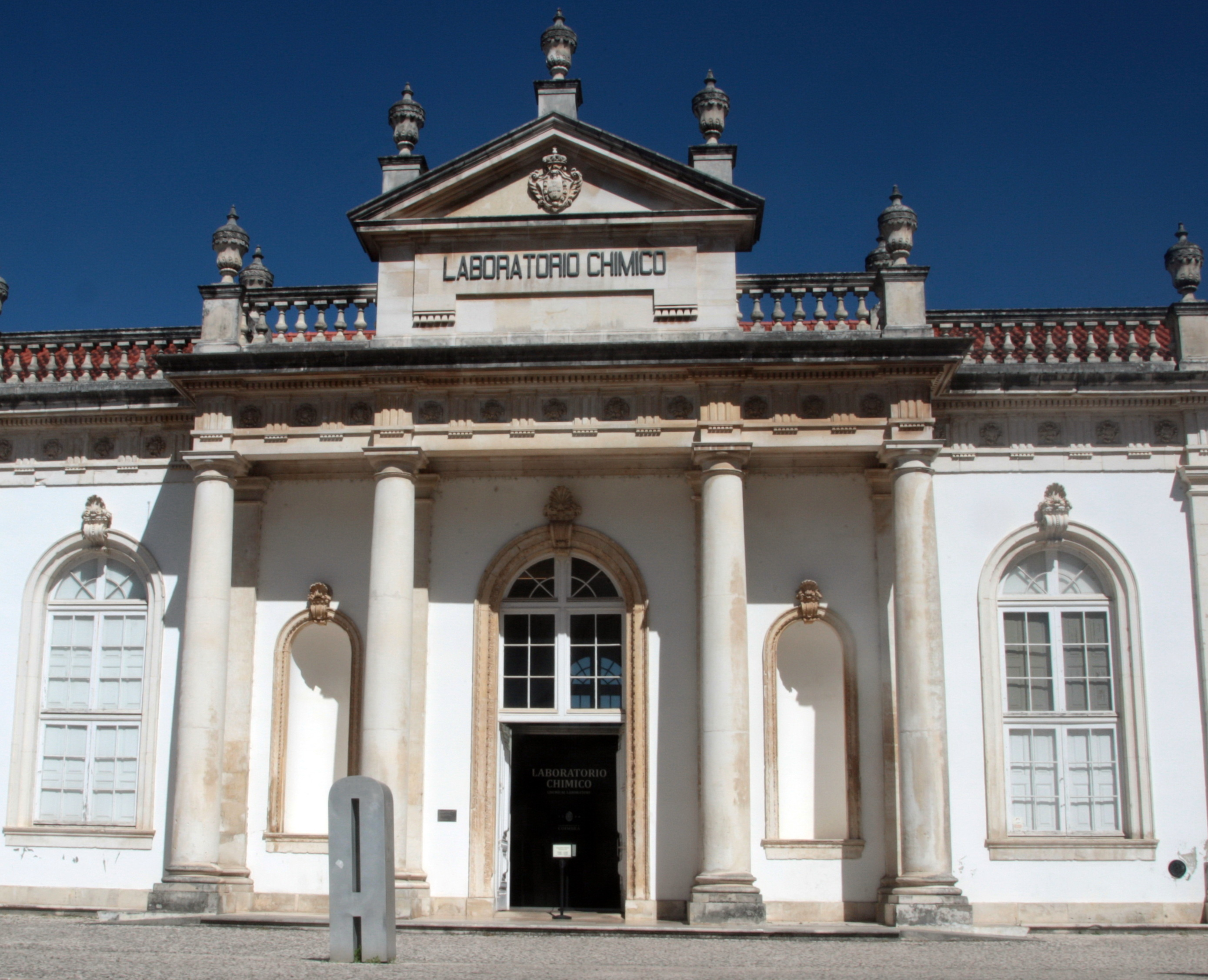
- Established: 1772
- Location: University of Coimbra, Coimbra, Portugal
- Type: Science museum
- Website: www.museudaciencia.org

The University of Coimbra Science Museum (Portuguese: Museu da Ciência da Universidade de Coimbra) in Coimbra, Portugal, incorporates the historical scientific collections of several units of the University of Coimbra. It includes the collection of scientific instruments from the 18th and 19th century of the Physics Museum, the collections of botanics, zoology, anthropology and mineralogy of the Natural History Museum, and the collections of the Astronomical Observatory and the Geophysical Institute of the University of Coimbra.

Formerly there were several museums in the university, including a museum of physics, a museum of zoology, a museum of natural history, and a museum of mineralogy and geology, which were managed by different university departments. They merged in 2006/2007 to form a single Science Museum.

Most of these collections date back to the reform of the University promoted by the Marquis of Pombal in 1772, where the teaching of science became of major importance, and are lodged in 18th-century buildings. They constitutes the most important science collection in Portugal and one of the most important ones in Europe.
