= Jeremy Green (maritime archaeologist) =

British-Australian maritime archaeologist (born 1942)

Jeremy N. Green (born 1942) is a British-Australian maritime archaeologist who established the Department of Maritime Archaeology at the Western Australian Museum in 1971.

During his tenure, the department undertook excavations of several Dutch East India Company shipwrecks, including the Batavia and Vergulde Draeck. He also directed maritime archaeological projects across Southeast Asia and the Indian Ocean, and was a foundation president of the Australian Institute for Maritime Archaeology.

In 2007, Green received the Rhys Jones Medal for Outstanding Contribution to Australian Archaeology. In 2021, he was invested as an Officer of the Order of Orange-Nassau for his work in maritime archaeology.

== Selected publications ==
- Green, Jeremy N. (1975). "The VOC ship Batavia wrecked in 1629 on the Houtman Abrolhos, Western Australia". International Journal of Nautical Archaeology. 4 (1): 43–63. doi:10.1111/j.1095-9270.1975.tb00902.x.
- Green, Jeremy (1986). "The survey and identification of the English East India Company ship Trial (1622)". International Journal of Nautical Archaeology. 15 (3): 195–204. doi:10.1111/j.1095-9270.1986.tb00577.x.
- Green, Jeremy (2004). Maritime Archaeology: A Technical Handbook (2nd ed.). Routledge.
