= Vallard Atlas =

1547 atlas produced in France

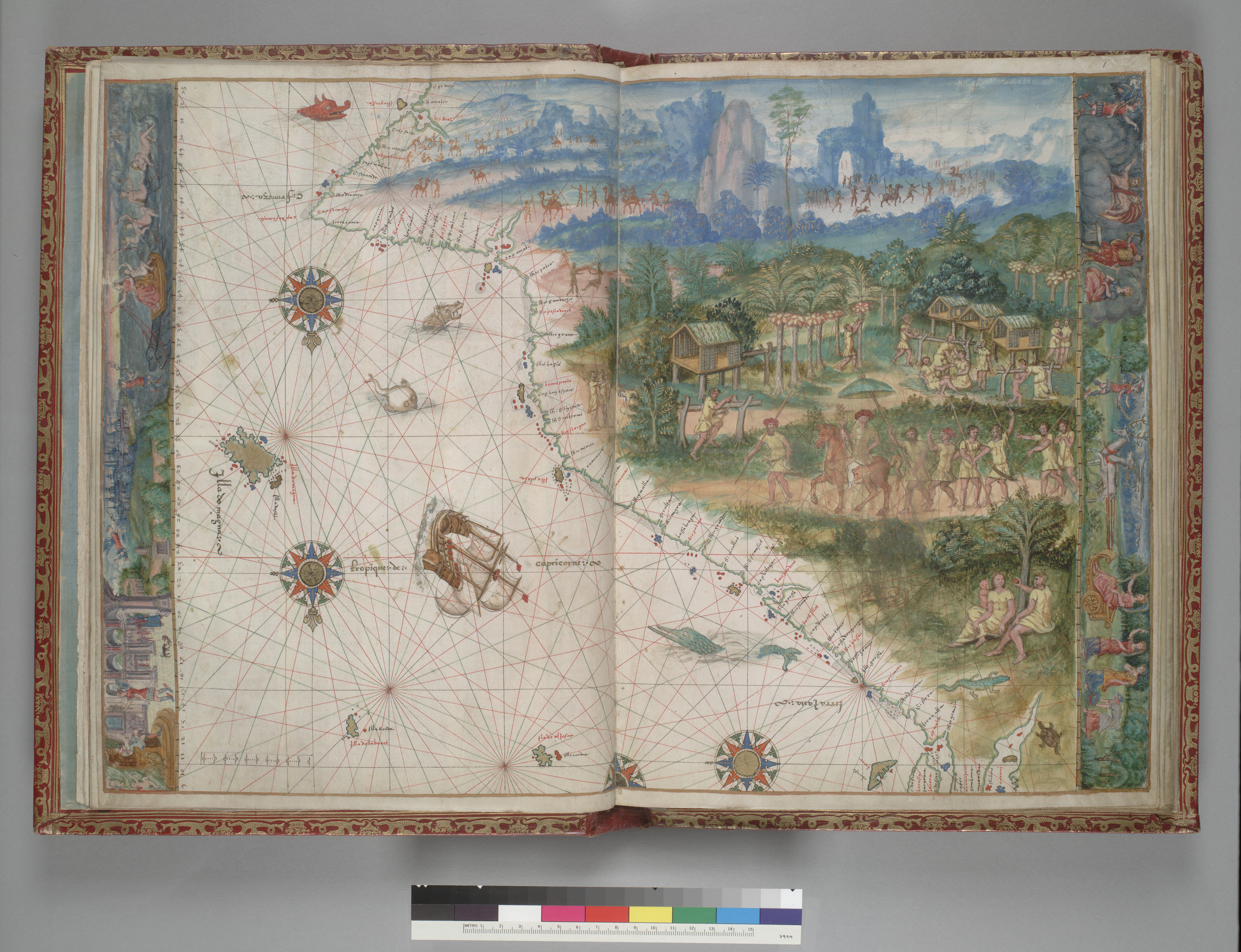
The Vallard Atlas, showing Jave la Grande's east coast

The Vallard Atlas is one of the most renowned atlases of the 16th century. It is an example of the Dieppe school of cartography, produced in Dieppe, France, in 1547. On the front page is the inscription "Nicolas Vallard de Dieppe, 1547"; he is believed to be the first owner and probably not the person who created the atlas. It is believed that the Vallard Atlas was developed either by a Portuguese cartographer or from an earlier Portuguese prototype. Since 1924, the original atlas has been held by the Huntington Library in San Marino, California, United States.

== Description ==
The atlas consists of 68 pages, which include a calendar and 15 nautical charts with illustrations, as well as detailed maritime information. It contains illustrations of the indigenous population of the New World.

The original atlas was bound in red leather with gold decorations in 1805.

An unusual feature of the work lies in the fact that the map reverses the common orientation of the world, with the south at the top and the north at the bottom.

== Speculation of the Portuguese discovery of Australia ==
There is some speculation that, like some other works of the Dieppe school of maps, the atlas may show the Australian coastline with its depiction of a continent labelled Jave la Grande, which would mean it preceded the documented discoveries by Willem Janszoon or James Cook. However, most historians do not accept this theory, and the interpretation of this feature of the Vallard and other Dieppe maps is highly contentious.
