= Jave la Grande =

Largest island in the world according to Marco Polo

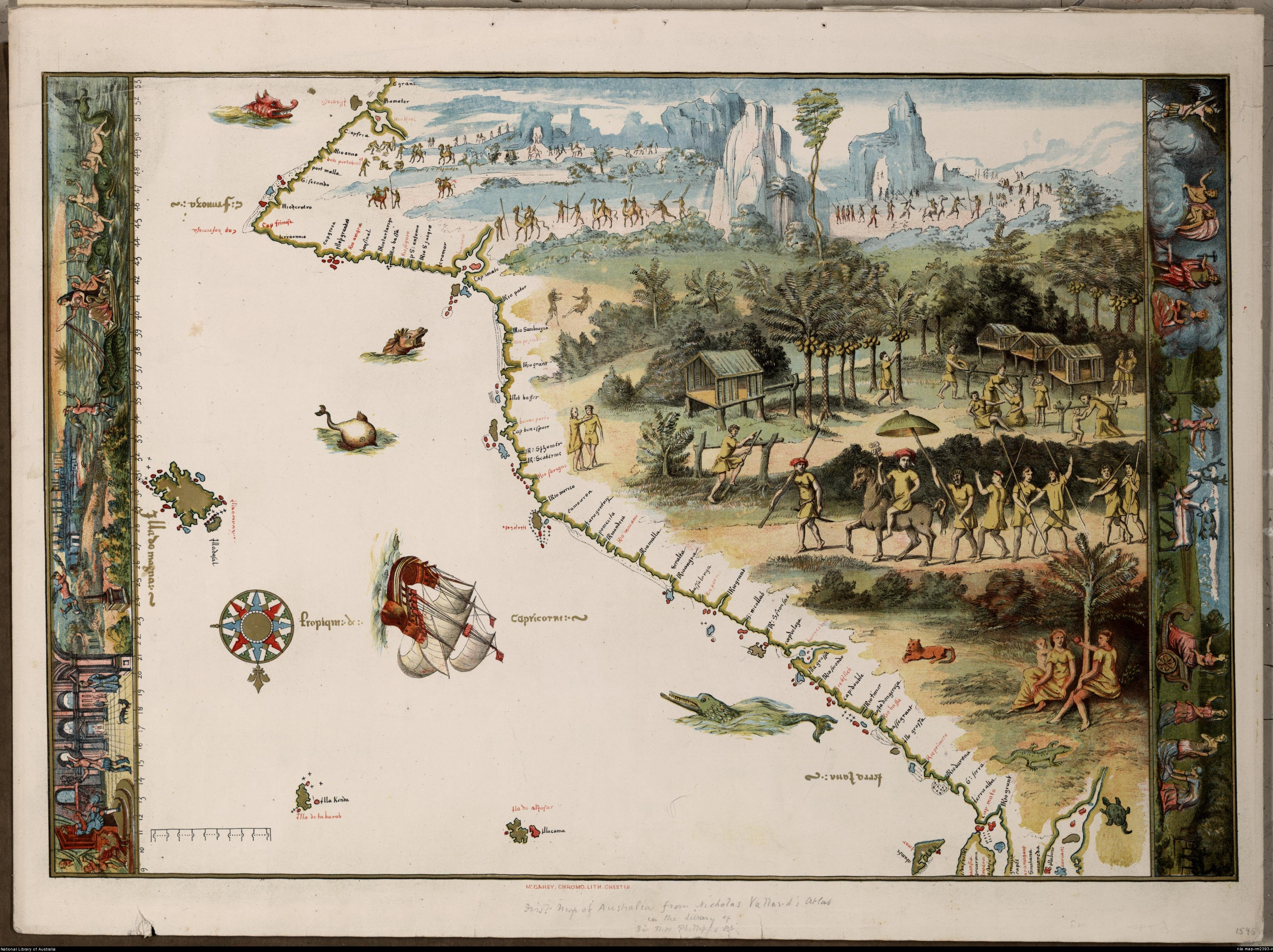
Jave La Grande's east coast: from Nicholas Vallard's atlas, 1547. This is part of an 1856 copy of one of the Dieppe Maps. Copy held by the National Library of Australia.

La grande isle de Java ("the great island of Java") was, according to Marco Polo, the largest island in the world; his Java Minor was the actual island of Sumatra, which takes its name from the city of Samudera (now Lhokseumawe) situated on its northern coast.

== Earliest account ==
Due to a scribal error in Book III of Marco Polo's travels treating of the route southward from Champa, where the name Java was substituted for Champa as the point of departure, Java Minor was located 1,300 miles to the south of Java Major, instead of from Champa, on or near an extension of the Terra Australis.

As explained by Sir Henry Yule, the editor of an English edition of Marco Polo's travels: "Some geographers of the 16th century, following the old editions which carried the travellers south-east of Java to the land of Boeach (or Locac), introduced in their maps a continent in that situation".

== Jean Alfonse's cosmography ==
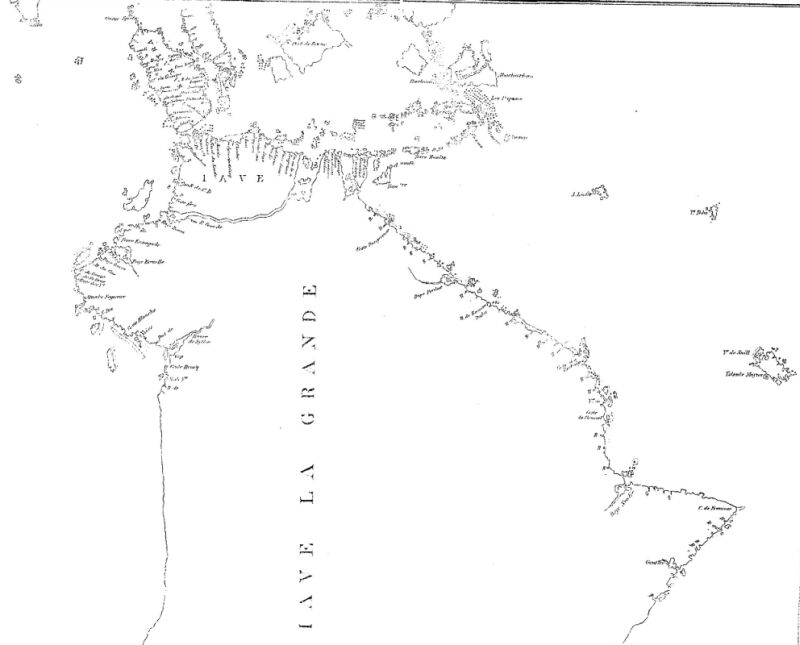
Representation of Grande Jave (Australia) in the 16th century (top left of the map, indication of the islands of Sumatra and Jave (Java))

Java Minor was identified as an island (the present Island of Java) by the Franco-Portuguese navigator and cosmographer Jean Alfonse in his work of 1544, La Cosmographie but Java Major according to him was part of the continent of Terra Australis, which extended as far as the Antarctic Pole and the Strait of Magellan. In La Cosmographie, Alfonse defined La Grande Jave as an extension of the giant Antarctic continent, or Terra Australis: "This Java touches the Strait of Magellan in the west, and in the east Terra Australis ... I estimate that the coast of the Ocean Sea called the Austral coast extends eastwards to Java, to the western coast of the said Java." Apparently in deference to Marco Polo's claim that Java Major was the largest island in the world, Alfonse gave the name Jave Mynore to the island of Java and the name La Grand Jave to the continental land to the south. Marco Polo's Java Minor, he called Samatrez (Sumatra). In La Cosmographie (1544), Alfonse said:

La Grand Jave is a land that goes as far as under the Antarctic Pole and from the Terre Australle in the west to the land of the Strait of Magellan on the eastern side. Some say that it is islands but from what I have seen of it, it is terre ferme [a continent] ... That called Jave Mynore is an island, but la Grand Jave is terre ferme.

== Later cartography ==
This cosmographical concept was exhibited in the mid-sixteenth century mappemondes of the School of mapmakers centred at Dieppe, Normandy, which in later times gave rise to the idea that Australia may have been discovered by Europeans long before the Dutch began to chart its coast in 1606 or before James Cook charted its east coast in 1770. This is seen clearly in Jean Rotz's Lande of Java of 1542, the Dauphin Map or Harleian World Map of c. 1547, and in Pierre Desceliers' mappemonde of 1546. Alfonse's map of La Grande Jave bears a striking resemblance to that of Rotz.

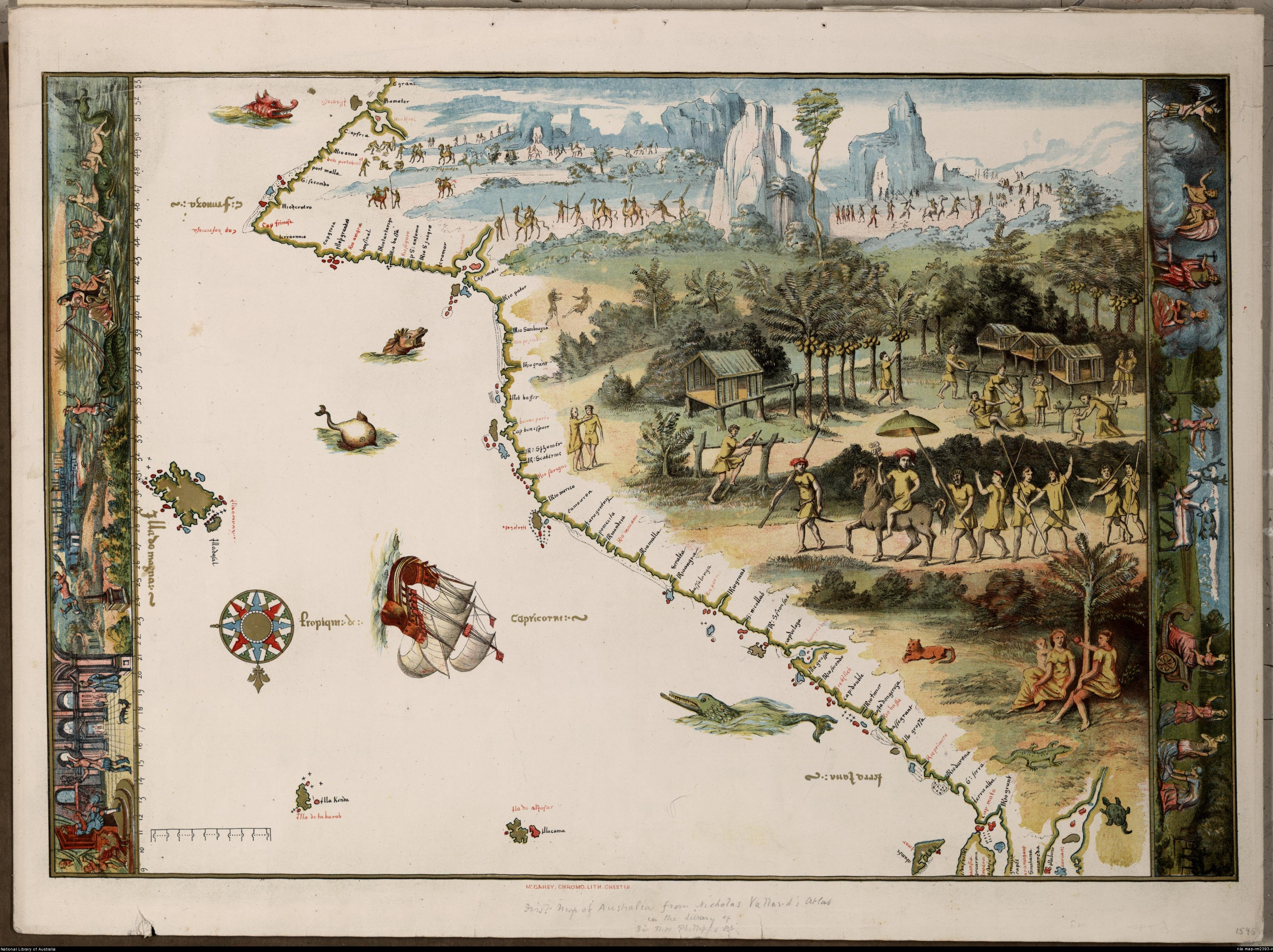
Details of the map of the Grande Jave by Nicolas Vallard (1547)

Vincenzo Coronelli, on his Terrestrial Globe made in Venice in 1688, referred to the uncertainty regarding the location of Marco Polo's Java Minor, noting that while in the opinion of some it could be identified with Sumatra, others believed it to be Sumbawa or New Holland. His inscription reads: "Various are the opinions of the Geographers concerning the location of Giava minore, some placing it under the Tropic of Capricorn, in accordance with what Marco Polo wrote in bk.3, cap.13. Others believe it to be Sumatra from the distance which the same Polo assigned to it, others take it for the Island of Sumbawa, and some others, more modern, for New Holland. We, from so much variety of opinion, do not offer a final conclusion on the matter, leaving the dispute undecided."

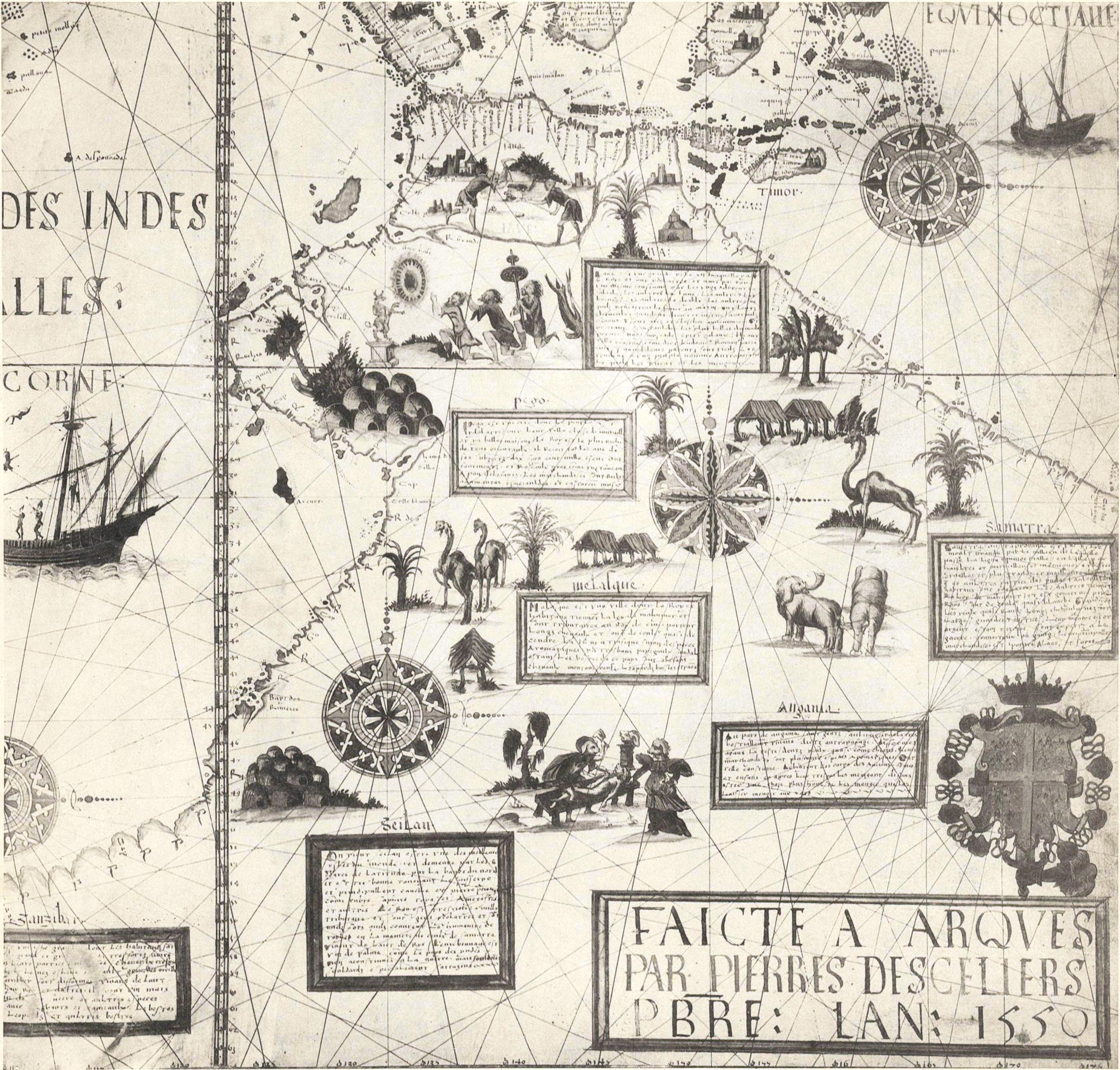
Map of the Grande Jave by Pierre Desceliers (1550)

In accordance with the uncorrected editions of Marco Polo's travels, on his 1688 Terrestrial Globe Coronelli inscribed over the northern part of Nuova Hollandia: "Some believe that in this place M. Polo discovered the Land of Lochac, and that 500 miles further on is found the Island of Pentan, and the Kingdom of Malaiur." As a result of this mis-placement southwards of the lands and islands described by Marco Polo, Coronelli and others confused Java Minor, Polo's name for Sumatra, with New Holland (Australia). This confusion was greater on the earlier Dieppe maps of the 1540s where Java Minor and Java Major (Jave la Grande) were transposed, apparently in accordance with Marco Polo's statement that Java Major was "the greatest island in the world". In the Dieppe maps, Jave la Grande was made a part of the Antarctic continent, Terra Australis.

== Marco Polo's placenames ==
Lochac (or Locach) was Marco Polo's rendition of the Chinese (Cantonese) Lo-huk, which was how they referred to the southern Thai kingdom of Lavapura, or Louvo (from Sanskrit Lavo, the present Lopburi "city of Lavo", after Lavo, in Hindu mythology the son of Rama: Lavo in Thai is spelled Lab, pronounced Lop'h; hence the name Lop'haburī, or Lop'ha-purī ลพบุรี (Lopburi)). Louvo was united with Siam in 1350. Lopburi was a province of the Khmer Empire in Marco Polo's time, and he may have used "Locach" to refer to Cambodia. The golden spires of Angkor, the capital of the Khmer empire, would have been a more likely inspiration of Marco's comment on the gold of Locach than the Lopburi of his time.

1570 map by Abraham Ortelius, TYPUS ORBIS TERRARUM (Figure of the Terrestrial Globe) depicting "Terra Australis Nondum Cognita" as a large continent on the bottom of the map and also an Arctic continent. South of Nova Guinea, the continent bears the inscription, Hanc continentem Australem, nonnulli Magellanicam regionem ab eius inventore nuncupant (This Austral continent is called by some the Magellanic region, after its discoverer).King, Robert J. (2020). "Magellanica: Finding the Antipodeans". The Globe (88): 1–18. ProQuest 2480820377.

As Zhou Daguan, the ambassador sent by the Yuan court to Cambodia in 1296 commented: "These [golden towers] are the monuments that have caused merchants from overseas to speak so often of 'Zhenla [Cambodia] the rich and noble'". The imprisonment by the Khmer ruler Jayavarman VIII of a Mongol emissary in 1281 would have been ample justification for Marco's remark on the inhumanity of its people: he said that Locach "was such a savage place that few people ever go there", and that "the king himself does not want anyone to go there or to spy out his treasure or the state of his realm". Marco also noted the abundance of elephants in Locach; Locach was notable in the Chinese annals for sending elephants as tribute.

Beach, as a mistranscription of Locach, originated with the 1532 editions of the Novus Orbis Regionum by Simon Grynaeus and Johann Huttich, in which Marco Polo's Locach was changed to Boëach, which was later shortened to Beach. Pentan is the island of Bintan, and Malaiur was the old Tamil name for the Sumatran city of Jambi (and is the origin of the national name Malay).

== Jave la Grande as a composite of Regio Patalis and Brasielie Regio ==
Robert J. King has suggested that Alfonse's description of La Grande Jave could also fit the Regio Patalis promontory on Oronce Fine's world map, and indicates that the Dieppe Maps appear to have conflated Marco Polo's Greater Java with Fine's Regio Patalis and Brasielie Regio. On the Dieppe Maps, the great promontory of JAVE LA GRANDE (Greater Java) extends, like the Regio Patalis, northward from the Austral continent. The evolution of Fine's REGIO PATALIS into JAVE LA GRANDE may have been influenced by the phrase used by Ludovico di Varthema, an Italian from Bologna who made a voyage in 1505 from Borneo to Java, who said that Java "prope in inmensum patet" ("extends almost beyond measure").

Although the word patet ("extends") has no connection with the city of Patala (now Thatta) at the mouth of the Indus River, which gave its name to the Regio Patalis ("Region of Patala"), the Dieppe mapmakers may have misunderstood the name to mean "the Extensive Region". Ludovico di Varthema also said that he had been told by the captain of the ship in which he had made the voyage from Borneo that on the southern side of Java Major, to the southward, "there are peoples who sail with their backs to our stars of the north until they find a day of but 4 hours, where the day does not last more than four hours", and that there it was colder than in any other part of the world.

The region where the shortest day would only last four hours would be in latitude 63° South. This could explain Jean Alfonse's description of La Grande Jave as an extension of the giant Antarctic continent: "This Java touches the Strait of Magellan in the west, and in the east Terra Australis ... I estimate that the coast of the Ocean Sea called the Austral coast extends eastwards [from the Strait of Magellan] to Java, to the western coast of the said Java". Guillaume Le Testu’s Grande Jave of 1556 is part of the Terre Australle, and bears a Baie Braecillie on its northwest coast, an appellation, as noted by Armand Rainaud in 1893, "which without doubt comes from the globes of Schoener and the maps of Oronce Fine".

This appellation appears on other Dieppe maps as baie bresille on the Rotz map, Baye bresille on the Harleian, and Baye bresill on the Desceliers, indicating the reliance of their makers on the Schoener/Fine cosmography. Johannes Schoener defined Brasilia australis as "an immense region toward Antarcticum newly discovered but not yet fully surveyed, which extends as far as Melacha and somewhat beyond; close to this region lies the great island of Zanzibar". On Fine's 1531 mappemonde, BRASIELIE REGIO is shown as part of the Terra Australis lying to the east of Africa and to the south of Java, just where Schoener located BRASIELIE REGIO on his 1523 globe, and where the Dieppe maps locate their Baye Bresille.

King concludes that the Dieppe maps should be seen in the context of cartographic history: they expressed the cosmographic concepts of the period. This accounts for the superficial resemblance (in the eyes of some observers) of their Jave la Grande to Australia: perhaps an instance of pareidolia. Jave la Grande can be accounted for by developments in cosmography and their expression in cartography without the necessity of positing unrecorded voyages of discovery by Portuguese or other early 16th century voyagers. He argues that either the Dieppe cartographers identified the Regio Patalis, shown on Oronce Fine's world maps of 1531 and 1534 as a huge peninsula of the southern continent, with Locach, as did Gerardus Mercator on his 1541 globe, or with Java Major (Jave la Grande). The Dieppe cartographers identified the Regio Patalis, shown on Oronce Fine's world maps of 1531 and 1534 as a huge peninsula of the southern continent, with either Locach, as did Gerardus Mercator on his 1541 globe, or with Java Major (Jave la Grande). He notes that Java Minor was identified with the island of Madura by Antonio Pigafetta, the diarist of Magellan's expedition. Pigafetta recorded that at Timor, the local people had explained to them, in response to their query regarding Java Minor: "that the lesser Java was the isle of Madura and half a league near to Greater Java". The mis-identification of Java Minor with the island of Madura allowed the southern coast of Java Major to remain undefined. This in turn permitted 16th-century cartographers to identify Java Major as a promontory of the Terra Australis and with Polo's Region of Locach.

The Unfortunate Isles discovered during Magellan's voyage across the Pacific in 1521 appear on the Dieppe maps, renamed with a corrupted version of his name as ysles de magna and ye de saill or some slight variation thereof and displaced to the vicinity of Jave la Grande / Lucach. They appear on Ortelius' world map of 1570 as Ins di los Tiburones and ins di S Pedro, the names given them by Magellan.

== See also ==
- Theory of the Portuguese discovery of Australia
- Makassan contact with Australia
- Javanese contact with Australia
- Dieppe maps
- Regio Patalis
- Abel Tasman
