= Kenneth McIntyre =

Australian lawyer and historian

Kenneth Gordon McIntyre OBE, ComIH (22 August 1910 – 20 May 2004) was an Australian lawyer and historian.

== Life and career ==
McIntyre was born in Geelong in 1910 and graduated from Geelong College as Dux of the School in 1926. He went on to study Arts and Law at the University of Melbourne and on graduation taught at the University from 1931 to 1945. In 1945 he left his teaching position and took on a legal practice in Box Hill, Melbourne and stood for mayor. He won the election and took a special interest in housing cooperatives. For his work as Mayor of Box Hill he was appointed an Officer of the Order of the British Empire in the 1962 New Year's Day Honours.

On retiring from public office in 1956, McIntyre returned to a passion for Portuguese history and undertook his main work on early Portuguese exploration of Australia. After its publication in 1977, The Secret Discovery of Australia, which revived and expanded on earlier ideas about the possible Portuguese exploration and mapping of Australia in the sixteenth century, quickly became well known and contentious. The Portuguese Government awarded McIntyre the Commander of the Order of Prince Henry the Navigator in 1983 for his work in researching and publicising Portuguese exploration. Following his death in 2004, McIntyre's family donated papers and documents, relating to the Portuguese voyages and the early mapping of the western Pacific, to the manuscript collection at the National Library of Australia.

McIntyre's interest in mathematics led him to develop a mathematical system for managing the finals in what was then known as the Victorian Football League (VFL). The four-team algorithm developed by McIntyre determined which teams would compete in the grand final. Known primarily and globally as the Page playoff system, although also locally as the Page-McIntyre system, it was first implemented in the 1931 VFL season and remains widely used in sports. McIntyre later developed further finals systems, all of which universally bear his name as the McIntyre system: The McIntyre Final Five system, which was first used in 1972, also remains in wide use across Australia for five-team finals tournaments; the McIntyre Final Six system was first used in 1991; and the McIntyre Final Eight system was first used in 1994, and by the National Rugby League as recently as 2011.

McIntyre also took an interest in constitutional law, and in 1950 he developed amendments to the method for electing the Senate in a double dissolution election. With the 1951 double dissolution election not yet triggered but considered inevitable, McIntyre noted that the extant circumstances – the single transferable vote with proportional representation method which had been adopted by the Senate in 1949, the close opinion polls between the two major parties, and no minor parties with a credible chance of winning a seat – meant that a 5–5 result for senators elected in each of the six states, leading to an overall 30–30 deadlock, was highly likely. McIntyre proposed that there be separate ballots for five half-term senators and five full-term senators – rather than a single ballot for all ten senators – resulting in the final result being a composite of twelve 3–2 results and therefore more likely to deliver an overall majority. His suggestion formed the basis of the Constitution (Avoidance of Double Dissolution Deadlocks) Bill, which passed the House of Representatives, but was defeated at Senate committee and never reached a referendum. When the 1951 election was finally held, the government won a 32–28 majority under the unchanged system, with Queensland and Western Australia each electing six Coalition senators.

== Bibliography ==
- The Secret Discovery of Australia : Portuguese ventures 200 years before Captain Cook (Souvenir Press, 1977) ISBN 0-285-62303-6
- The Rebello transcripts : Governor Phillip's Portuguese prelude (Souvenir Press, 1984) ISBN 0-285-62603-5

== See also ==
- Theory of the Portuguese discovery of Australia
- Mahogany Ship

== Sources ==
- Obituary in The Age 15 June 2004
