= The Poppykettle Papers =

The Poppykettle Papers is an epic adventure for children written in 1999 by Michael Lawrence and illustrated by Robert R. Ingpen. It is based on the old tales of the Hairy Peruvians, a community of tiny fisherfolk, who centuries ago sprang to life from sacrificial Inca dolls on the coast of Peru. The Hairy Peruvians had lived on this coast for generations, often at the mercy of El Nino, the temperamental sea god. Over the years, many expeditions set out in flimsy reed boats to see a more hospitable land across the ocean to the west, but none returned.

The Poppykettle Papers recounts the exploits of Aloof the Far-Sighted and his resourceful sister Arnica and their quest to find the Unchosen Land in the company of Andante the Whistler, Astute the Wise, and their grandfather Don Avante.

== Plot summary ==
This is the tale of five Hairy Peruvians, the last of their kind, and an epic journey from the shores of old Peru to a new land at World's Edge, where the sun goes down. These are no ordinary adventurers, however, but "people of sensible size", which to us Tall Ones is very small indeed.

== Background ==
In 1980, Robert Ingpen published The Voyage of the Poppykettle, a children's book. He later published The Unchosen Land, its sequel.

These stories were so popular in Ingpen's home, Geelong, that a fountain and an annual Poppykettle Festival celebrate the mythical landing of the "hairy Peruvians".

The Poppykettle Papers is an updated re-telling of the original two books.

== Historical and folkloric references ==
The book ties into various historical and folkloric stories of Australia's early settlement.

One such story is the discovery in 1847, by Governor Charles La Trobe, of a set of keys embedded in the earth near Corio Bay. These keys, known as the Geelong Keys, are believed by some to have been dropped by Portuguese explorers some hundreds of years previously, but the Poppykettle Papers suggest another origin—namely, that the Hairy Peruvians left them there.
