= The Voyage of the Poppykettle =

- The cover of The Voyage of the Poppykettle.
- Author: Robert Ingpen
- Language: English
- Publication date: 1980

The Voyage of the Poppykettle (later re-published as Voyage of Poppykettle) is a 1980 children's book about a group of "hairy Peruvians" setting out from Peru to discover Australia. It was written and illustrated by Robert Ingpen, who also wrote the sequel, The Unchosen Land, and is considered amongst his best-known works.

The story of the Poppykettle was later updated with new material by Michael Lawrence and republished as The Poppykettle Papers in 1999.

The story contains reference to the Geelong Keys.

== Background ==
In 1975, Robert Ingpen developed the story based on his work with the United Nations in Peru. As part of that work, he was researching ancient Inca fishing stories, and two elements of that research formed the kernel of the Poppykettle idea: Inca dolls and pottery; and a plaque which commemorated an expedition from the headland at Callao in the 16th century into the Pacific Ocean.

Years later he wrote this children's book and its sequel based on that idea.

These stories were so popular in Ingpen's home, Geelong, Victoria that a fountain and an annual Poppykettle Festival celebrate the mythical landing of the "hairy Peruvians".

Ingpen won the 1986 Hans Christian Andersen Award for illustration for this book.

== Critical reception ==
Karen Coats, in a review for Bulletin of the Center for Children's Books of a revised 2005 version writes that the voyage has "allure" and that the "particular blend of doll-like characters, helpful grandmas and dolphins, and an ordinary/extraordinary vessel" might capture children's imagination. She describes the illustrations as "painterly". She criticises the fact that the number of "hairy Peruvians" varies during the story and calls the ending "rather trite". A review in Kirkus Reviews describes the artwork as in "impressionistic, Turner-esque style" that illustrates the tale with "engrossing drama".
