= Sydney Rae White =

English actress

- Born: Sydney Rae Cressida White; 30 November 1991 (age 34); London, England
- Other name: Syd
- Occupations: Actress, singer
- Years active: 2002–present
- Spouse: Rob Kendrick
- Website: shidknee.tumblr.com

Sydney Rae Cressida White (born 30 November 1991) is an English singer, musician and actress, best known as the front woman of UK rock band ‘The Wild Things’ and for playing the role of "Erin Noble" in series 3 and 4 of the CBBC drama series Young Dracula. White grew up in West London with her parents and her four brothers, Paul, Adam, Cameron and Spike. She began acting professionally at the age of 10, and shortly after began attending the Sylvia Young Theatre School in London.

White co-formed the British rock band The Wild Things alongside her brother, Cameron White, her husband, Rob Kendrick, and drummer Pete Wheeler. Their recent single ‘Only Attraction’ has been released to worldwide acclaim, charting in Europe, South America & Japan. It has been featured across multiple Spotify/Amazon worldwide playlists, and has received significant playlisting from radio stations such as Virgin FM. and BBC Radio 2.

They’ve sold out venues across the UK & the US, and have been featured across Rolling Stone, Consequence, Clash, Kerrang! and more.

The band have just completed work on their second album, ‘Afterglow’, with Pete Townshend. They supported Dirty Honey on their European tour in February 2023, and KISS on the UK leg of their ‘End of the Road’ tour summer 2023 - plus have their own UK headline tour coming in October 2023.

Sydney also recorded and released a song for download separately from The Wild Things, with her Young Dracula co-star Gerran Howell, entitled 'Sun Goes Down'.

== Filmography ==
Year	Show/Film	Role	Notes
2005	The Snow Queen	Gerda	TV movie
2006	The Basil Brush Show	Billie Jo	TV series (1 episode)
2007	The Sarah Jane Adventures	Bubbleshock Girl	Episode: "Invasion of the Bane"
2007	As the Bell Rings	Emma	TV series (both series)
2010	Rules of Love	Jess	TV movie
2010	Misfits	Tanya	TV series (1 episode)
2011	Doctors	Crystal Henshaw	BBC (1 episode)
2011–2012	Young Dracula	Erin Noble	TV series (series 3 and 4)
2013	Starlings	Coggie	Sky 1 (series 2)
2013	Casualty	Global asylum girl	BBC (1 episode)
2014–2017	Uncle	Gwen	BBC 3 (6 episodes)
2014	Pramface	Poppy	BBC 3
2015	Silent Witness	Amy Greenwood	BBC 1 (2 episodes)
2016	Lost Sitcoms	Rita	BBC 4 (1 episode)
