= Encyclopedia of Things That Never Were =

Book by Robert Ingpen and Michael Page

Encyclopedia of Things That Never Were is a book by Robert Ingpen and Michael Page published in 1985.

== Contents ==
Encyclopedia of Things That Never Were is a book detailing topics from myth and magic, and was written by Page and painted by Ingpen.

== Reception ==
Dave Langford reviewed Encyclopedia of Things That Never Were for White Dwarf #74, and stated that "Good marks for production and eclecticism beyond the usual European and Greek myths: but at [the price] there'd have to be a really yawning space on your coffee table."

== Reviews ==
- Review by Chris Morgan (1986) in Fantasy Review, February 1986
- Review by Don D'Ammassa (1987) in Science Fiction Chronicle, #89 February 1987
- Review by Baird Searles (1987) in Isaac Asimov's Science Fiction Magazine, November 1987
