= List of Young Dracula episodes =

This is a list of episodes of the British television series Young Dracula.

== Series overview ==
Series	Episodes	Originally released	
Series	Episodes	First released	Last released
1	14	21 September 2006	21 December 2006
2	13	2 November 2007	8 February 2008
3	13	31 October 2011	12 December 2011
4	13	29 October 2012	1 December 2012
5	13	13 January 2014	31 March 2014

== Episodes ==
=== Series 1 (2006) ===
No. overall	No. in season	Title	Original release date
1	1	"When You're a Stranger"	21 September 2006
Count Dracula is forced to move from Transylvania to a castle in Stokely, Wales, with his children Vlad and Ingrid and his servant, Renfield. Vlad has no wish to follow in his father's footsteps in becoming an evil, fully fledged vampire. On the other hand the Branagh family's youngest son, Robin Branagh is a passionate vampire fan who Vlad meets when he climbs up into his room through the window. Note: First appearance of Vlad, Ingrid and Count Dracula, Renfield, Zoltan, Robin, Ian, Paul, Chloe, Graham and Elizabeth Branagh.
2	2	"Dead-Ucation"	28 September 2006
Vlad tries to persuade his Dad to let him go to school where he has to try extra hard to conceal his and his family's heritage. Vlad has no luck until the headmistress of Stokely Grammar School says the Count will have to send both Vlad and Ingrid to school or he'll be taken to court, so he agrees. It is also the first day of teaching at the school for the woodwork teacher, Eric Van Helsing, a rather useless vampire slayer with an annoying obsession with killing vampires, and also his son Jonathan. Van Helsing at first mistakes Robin for being a vampire because of his cape he adores wearing and for him taking the blame for owning a brooch depicting the Dracula coat of arms, which in fact was given to Vlad by the Count. Van Helsing turns his attention to Vlad and his family after discovering they live in a castle and that he was from Transylvania. Robin's sister Chloe also discovers Vlad and his family are vampires but she, like Robin, agrees not to tell anyone. Note: First appearance of Eric and Jonathan Van Helsing.
3	3	"Mummy Returns"	5 October 2006
Ingrid, being tired of being ignored by her father, invites her and Vlad's mother, Magda, to come to stay for a while, but having previously run off with a werewolf called Patrick, the Count is not as pleased to see her. Vlad warns his father not to take her back because she is evil and manipulative. When Magda is thrown out of the castle and stays with the Branaghs' she decides to marry the Count, so that if the Count mysteriously dies, she would get the castle. She brings Van Helsing to the castle to slay Count Dracula after the ceremony, but with the help of Robin and Chloe, Vlad exposes his mother's plans and she is kicked out of the castle again while Van Helsing fails to slay the Count. Note: First Appearance of Madgda Carmilla Elizabetta Barthoria Westenra.
4	4	"Slaytime TV"	12 October 2006
The Count becomes addicted to daytime TV and decides that making a film would be easy. Meanwhile, Robin convinces the Count that he and Vlad must have been switched at birth as he and his family were in Transylvania during the time that he and Vlad were babies. Ingrid fakes a diary of her mother's to show the boys were switched at birth as an attempt to get rid of Vlad, but when she realises how happy she has made Robin she confesses.
5	5	"Like Father, Like Son"	19 October 2006
When Vlad and Robin are suspended from school due to Ingrid's attempt of originally planning to suspend herself, the Count tries to take on their education at home, but a hypnosis lesson goes astray. Vlad accidentally hypnotises the Count, but uses it to his advantage by making him forget he's a vampire. Meanwhile, Robin asks Vlad to hypnotise his own parents so they would believe they are actual vampires, but it doesn't go according to plan and they try to drink Robin and Chloe's blood. Vlad also reveals to Ingrid the truth that Van Helsing is a vampire slayer.
6	6	"Toothache"	26 October 2006
A toothache makes Vlad think that his fangs are starting to grow through. Meanwhile, it is Ingrid's 15th birthday and the Count is trying to marry her off to a vampire farmer from Transiberia so Robin agrees to Ingrid's request to pretend to be her boyfriend. It is only when Robin is exposed and is about to be punished by the Count does Vlad tell the Count he thinks his fangs are coming through, but it is revealed that his toothache was caused by cavities after eating too many sweets.
7	7	"A Matter of Life and Chess"	2 November 2006
It's Parents' Evening at Stokely Grammar School, much to Robin and Vlad's dismay, especially when Van Helsing is looking forward to 'speaking' with Vlad's father. Meanwhile, a mummy with a vendetta against the Count escapes from Dracula's castle and heads for the school, looking for him. Robin is otherwise engaged, if parents evening doesn't go well he will have to go to 'happy camp', much to his horror.
8	8	"Blood Relations"	9 November 2006
Vlad's 13th birthday has arrived and while he is making plans for a 'normal' party, his strict and traditional grandparents turn up for a surprise. They insist that he undergoes a special ritual to gain his full vampire powers three years early. Luckily Chloe gives Vlad a sunlamp for his birthday and Ingrid uses it to stop the ceremony. Note: First and only appearance of Krone and Atilla Westenra.
9	9	"The Sleepover"	16 November 2006
The Count is delighted when a cockroach epidemic forces the Branagh family to temporarily move into the castle with him, but because Mrs. Branagh is so nice to the Count he decides to marry her instead of just drinking her blood. To do this she has to drink his blood. Vlad, Robin, Chloe and Ingrid have to team up to stop this from happening.
10	10	"Blood Sport"	23 November 2006
In his continuing efforts to be normal, Vlad wants to try out for the school rugby league team, but his father does not allow it. Only when Robin says that it is a 'horrible and brutal' sport does he change his mind. Meanwhile, Robin's parents also want him to join the team, but Robin seeks help from Chloe to help him get out of the trials.
11	11	"Father's Day"	30 November 2006
Vlad and Robin take their fathers camping for Father's Day, but the men have an argument that will seemingly end in a duel. Chloe try to tell Renfield that he should stand up for himself and demand recognition.
12	12	"Halloscream"	7 December 2006
On Halloween, the main activities of the Dracula and Van Helsing children turn out to be restraining their fathers. A curse is put on the Dracula family reducing them to mortal Breathers unless three screams are heard. Ingrid goes round to the Branagh house to babysit Robin's brothers but screams when she asks them who the most beautiful girl in the school is. The Count then screams when Vlad accidentally throws garlic into the same room as him. Finally Vlad screams when trying to protect Robin from Eric Van Helsing when he tries to stake them.
13	13	"The Blood Test"	14 December 2006
It is time for Vlad to undergo a test that all vampires must take – the blood test. Vlad wants to fail the test so he would almost pass as human, but the Count threatens that Vlad would not see his friends any more if he failed. Vlad seeks help from vampire-expert, Robin. After an argument involving Vlad complaining that Robin isn't a 'normal' friend, Robin joins the football team which turns out that he is good at. Vlad at first tries to fail the blood test, but after but Robin reconciles with Vlad he passes but just barely.
14	14	"Countdown"	21 December 2006
To find a new wife, the Count decides to host a vampire Hunt Ball, but when Van Helsing shoots him with a garlic arrow they believe the Count is dead. It turns out however that his metal flask of poisoned blood saved the Count which was a flask Van Helsing had given to the Count when disguised as a female guest. Jonno finally accepts that they are all vampires and wants to go slaying with his dad.

=== Series 2 (2007–08) ===
No. overall	No. in season	Title	Original release date
15	1	"Kidnipped"	2 November 2007
Now the Count knows that there is a slayer in town, things are going to get much more interesting in Stokely, but when both the Count and Van Helsing kidnap each other's children, things go unexpectedly awry.
16	2	"The Yanks Are Coming"	9 November 2007
The Draculas are visited by the Count's brother, Ivan from America along with his children Boris and Olga. The Count, remembering Ivan as a bloodthirsty, monstrous vampire from his youth, is shocked to find that life in America has turned his brother 'blood-free'. Ivan, who now wishes to be known as Harvey, attempts to convert the Count to the blood-free way of life, but fails miserably. Vlad meanwhile, meets his cousin Boris, who is to go through the 'transformation' in a couple of days time. Eventually, the Count agrees to go 'blood-free' if and only if his brother can convince Van Helsing to give up slaying. Ivan attempts this, but having always had a weak spot for slayer's blood, fails and reverts to his old ways, much to the delight of The Count. Note: First appearance of Ivan, Boris and Olga Dracula.
17	3	"Mirror Mirror"	16 November 2007
With the day of his 'transformation' getting ever closer, Boris' 'blood-lust' and other vampire traits are starting to show, and are making life increasingly difficult for those around him. Meanwhile, Vlad discovers the Dracula family 'Blood Mirror', an ancient Mirror that controls the vampire power of the Dracula family. Breaking it will prevent Vlad from ever becoming a vampire, but will do the same to every member of his family. With his father being over 600 years in age, transforming him into a human will reduce him to dust. Ingrid pretends that she has smashed to the blood mirror to win a bet against Olga after they argue over who is the most evil.
18	4	"Bad Reflection"	23 November 2007
The time has come for Boris to go through the transformation. Once complete, the transformation from small, wimp-like cowering Boris to an evil, power hungry maniac is extreme. Boris tries to convince Vlad that he is not evil and is in fact the same Boris he was before, but more confident and powerful. However, Boris secretly steals the power from the Blood Mirror. By the end of the episode, his image as a power-crazed lunatic is made clear to the rest of the family. Vlad tricks him into returning his powers to the Count and Ivan, and he is carted off back to America in a straitjacket. Note: Last appearance of Olga and Ivan Dracula.
19	5	"Dad's Back"	30 November 2007
Whilst learning about Alchemy (used here to describe the science of creating life from a smaller piece of DNA), Vlad discovers a diary belonging to Renfield's father. It contains an introduction to a potion to turn a vampire human, but the vital instructions are missing. Vlad brings Renfield Senior back to life, but things do not go a smooth as he hoped. Vlad is forced to kick Renfield out of the castle and Renfield Senior pretends he wishes to turn Vlad human, but he secretly is creating a potion to turn the Count into "an ancient pile of dust" when he refused to offer him immortality. When Vlad, still in the dark about Renfield Senior's real intentions, goes as far as to trick Robin into involuntarily donating all of his blood for the potion, it's up to Ingrid, Chloe and Renfield to stop Renfield Senior in his tracks. Note: First and only appearance of Renfield Sr.
20	6	"Baby Dracula"	7 December 2007
Magda returns to the castle with a shock-announcement: she is pregnant. Stating that it is the Count's baby, she moves back in and convinced that it will be a boy. The Count immediately replaces Vlad with the unborn baby as his son and heir. The baby is named Vladimir and Vlad is renamed Barry, much to his annoyance. Meanwhile, Van Helsing contemplates giving up slaying for good, pointing out the dangers involved to Jonathan who tries hard to convince him otherwise. Shortly after the birth, the Count goes to finish the ceremony to mark baby Vlad's new status as his son and heir, but the baby is revealed to be part-werewolf, clearly showing that the Count was not never the father to begin with. Note: First appearance of Barry "Wolfie" Westenra.
21	7	"Insomnia"	14 December 2007
Vlad is having nightmares where he is being chased by Robin's family, who are depicted as vampire slayers. Trouble is, Vlad is falling asleep regularly and uncontrollably. Worse still, any injuries he obtains whilst dreaming somehow manifest themselves on his person. It becomes clear that he must survive in the 'dreamworld' to survive real life. Vlad is given advice to connect with his vampire powers by Robin whilst in the 'dreamworld', who is depicted as a wise-man. In the 'dreamworld' Vlad discovers that he is the 'chosen one' and will one day lead all vampires to glory. Vlad still doesn't want to be a vampire and lies to his Dad when he asks and tries to deny it. Meanwhile, Mina, Jonathan's mother, visits him and Van Helsing. Discovering that they are now both obsessed with vampires, the reason she left Eric in the first place, she decides to stay to try to knock some sense into them. Note: First appearance of Mina Van Helsing.
22	8	"Love Bites"	21 December 2007
It's Valentines Day, also known as 'Bag a Breather' day in the vampire world. Vlad must do all he can to prevent his father devouring anyone that day, but the problem arises when a new girl named Delila (Klariza Clayton) distracts Vlad's attention from this task. He and Robin fight over Delila, but Vlad succeeds in the end, using his powers of hypnosis to his benefit. Meanwhile, a money-making scam of Ingrid's is ruined by a boy named Will Clark. In trying to seek her revenge, however, Ingrid finds she cannot hypnotise Will. It translates that this is a sign that Ingrid is in love — as Will is a breather, Ingrid is not happy.
23	9	"Body Swap"	11 January 2008
With the arrival of the Staff of Carpathia at Stokely Museum, the legend of the staff says that it can stop the cause of vampirism. Vlad thinks he's found a way of escaping his destiny, while the Count and Van Helsing have other ideas, especially after an unintended collision has mind-blowing consequence when the Count's life force gets trapped inside Van Helsing and doesn't want to leave, but all this leaves his body defenceless. When the Count finally returns to his own body, he lies convincingly to Vlad that the Staff of Carpathia did not cure vampirism and that it was just a back scratcher.
24	10	"Sweet Sixteen"	18 January 2008
It's Ingrid's 16th birthday, and time for her to transform into a fully fanged vampire. Things don't go to plan when she discovers she'll hurt Will if she becomes evil, something she really does not want to do. Vlad, Ingrid and Robin are forced to go on the run to escape Ingrid's evil reflection.
25	11	"Eclipse"	25 January 2008
A policeman calls round asking for the Count. Vlad sends him away telling him to come back the next day at 1:00 pm, but when a total eclipse makes it dark for a few minutes Ingrid meets Will at the cinema. When he remarks about wanting to date a vampire she proves she is the one but when Will panics she bites him. Meanwhile the police have found a missing man the Count kidnapped but it turns out that the missing man is actually a dangerous criminal.
26	12	"When Vampires Go Bad"	1 February 2008
The Grand High Vampire comes to Stokely and sentences the Count to death after it is discovered he is constantly fraternising with Breathers, but the Grand High Vampire is killed first. Will and Justice Moroi arrange a duel after Moroi calls Will a half-fang. It turns out that the insane Boris slayed both Moroi and the Grand High Vampire but he is killed by the Grand High Vampire's Crown. Van Helsing attempts to slay the Count who says that unless he leaves quietly Mina will be killed. Van Helsing is kicked out of the slayers' guild. At the end Van Helsing swears revenge.
27	13	"The Chosen One"	8 February 2008
It is time to appoint a new Grand High vampire and Vlad is having ghost visions of the old leader telling him that he is the Chosen One. Anyone else who tries on the crown becomes disintegrated by it. Many vampires try and wear the crown but all are turned to dust. Then Count Dracula wants to put on the crown. Ingrid and Will persuade him to but they are actually trying to get him killed. Meanwhile Eric and Jonno return to the Slayers base against guild orders and run into a professional slayer with some more advanced weaponry, and a fight ensues at the crowning ceremony. The Van Helsings are re-united, Eric finally slays his first vampire, the Branaghs and Mina Van Helsing finally accept that the family are all vampires and Will, amongst several other vampires, is slain. Vlad finally realises that in order to save his family he must don the Crown and accept his full vampire powers. He wipes the memory of all humans (including the bewildered Renfield) in the building and then collapses to the floor unconscious. The Count remained trapped in a UV cage, leaving Ingrid to claim the 'throne' and claim to make "the streets of Stokely run red with blood". Note: Last appearance of The Branaghs, Eric Van Helsing and Boris Dracula.

=== Series 3 (2011) ===
No. overall	No. in season	Title	Original release date
28	1	"Hide and Seek"	31 October 2011
Four years has passed and Vlad and the Count have fled from Stokley. Pursued by slayers and radical vampires alike, the Count and Vlad keep a low profile and "hide in plain sight" by buying a school called 'Garside Grange'. The Count is determined that Vlad fulfils his destiny to lead the vampire race, but this is threatened by the Count's own tendency to create mayhem and disaster on a daily basis and by the re-emergence of the anarchic Ingrid, who brings a trail of destruction in her wake. The family is reunited when Erin saves a sick Ingrid from the slayers and Vlad comes to their aid. Note: First appearance of Miss Alex McCauley, Erin Noble and Ryan Noble.
29	2	"The Enemy Within"	1 November 2011
Erin has her newly-bitten brother in the boot of her car and plans to slay the Draculas. She fails when she gets her chance with Ingrid. Vlad has to cope with the forced arrival of several tutors. He manages to get rid of the first two, but he cannot outwit menacing Bertrand, who brings with him a book, the Praedictum Impaver, which only the Chosen One can open, and is bound with the bones of the enemies from the years, similar to the chosen one's crown. Ingrid is cured after several hideous concoctions produce hairy results. Note: First appearance of Bertrand Du Fortunesa.
30	3	"Faustian Slip"	7 November 2011
Magda arrives as a penniless bag lady (utterly attractive to Renfield) and is taken into the home, but it is a ploy for Magda to emotionally manipulate Vlad into giving her the Regency. She plans to get famous on the back of the Chosen One and sets up media interviews. Vlad is determined to prevent this, as it would reveal their location, leaving them open for attack. Not only that but Erin is also planning on slaying the Draculas by calling a brotherhood and telling them the location. Unknowingly Vlad prevents this with the help of Renfield and Magda is also eventually ousted but leaves a little something of herself behind, Wolfie, the son of her and Patrick.
31	4	"Fangs for the Memories"	8 November 2011
Vlad comforts an upset Erin who has been having nightmares about failing to save her brother Ryan, and they talk about his past and how he tried not to become a vampire and his life back in Stokely. Vlad confides his plans for vampires and breathers to live side-by-side, and Erin agrees to help him. Unknown to them, Bertrand overhears and disapproves. Meanwhile, the Count decides he wants a statue of himself placed in the school courtyard, but things don't go to plan when he trusts Renfield with creating the masterpiece. Wolfie, initially an annoyance to the Count, becomes something off a cute little child to the Count, who lets him stay when Renfield notes that, if Wolfie goes, it will just be him and the Count again. The Count, horrified, allows Wolfie to stay on a "trial" basis, though it's not really a trial since the Count wants him to stay indefinitely.
32	5	"Carpathian Feast"	14 November 2011
Vlad and the Count are clashing. Ingrid is nearly better and stirring things up between Vlad and his dad. The Count demands Vlad to show him some respect by throwing a Carpathian feast, which involves a vampire being thrown to the flames — and Erin is the intended victim. Vlad tries to save Erin by kissing her and other things — according to Ingrid's deliberate misinformation, a kiss from the Chosen One will save any vampire from the flames. Erin's lips however are warm and the secret that she is a breather is revealed. Now he knows she's been lying, but he still saves her from the flames, mentioning at the last moment to the Count that they have not signed the appropriate forms and failure to do so will result in ritual staking.
33	6	"Blood Thief"	15 November 2011
Vlad asks Erin on a date, but their plans are interrupted when Bertrand tries to kill Erin by deliberately giving wrong information and locking her outside until dawn, not knowing that she isn't a vampire. Meanwhile, the Count discovers that one of his favourite vintages of blood has been stolen and replaced with soy blood. He gets Wolfie to guard the blood cellar in an attempt to stop it from happening again, but before Wolfie guards the cellar, he turns into a dog. When he is guarding the cellar, Ingrid tells him to play dead and let her go in. In an attempt to regain his Masters favour, Renfield goes on a hunt for forensic evidence to find the culprit. In the end Vlad manages to rescue Erin and protect the fact that she is a breather and The Blood Thief is revealed to be Ingrid. The Count, deciding that he has had enough of Ingrid gives her the choice of being given to slayers or going to school, and she chooses school, despite being twenty.
34	7	"Bad to the Bone: Part 1"	21 November 2011
The unopened book emits signals to the leader of the clans, Ramanga, who arrives demanding answers. Bertrand threatens Vlad, while Vlad thinks that Bertrand knows that Erin is a breather but the only by saying that he knows Erin's and Vlad's secret. The secret that Bertrand knows is that Vlad wants vampires and breathers to live together. Not knowing this Vlad tries to hide Erin until he can figure out a way to help Erin escape. When Vlad hears voices inside his head he follows them and is led to the cellar where the blood mirror is. Two gargoyles on either side of the blood mirror throw him inside it. Meanwhile, Ramanga is insulted by Vlad's absence and threatens the family who try to buy time by creating a life-size puppet of Vlad but it all goes horribly wrong when Renfield (who is doing the voice of puppet Vlad) says Praedictum Impaver wrong and accidentally knocks of the head. Inside the blood mirror, Vlad battles with his bad reflection before his bad side tells him he doesn't only have one evil reflection but he has 1000 and all of them leap inside Vlad's body telling them that he could be the strongest vampire. Vlad becomes more powerful and more evil as each reflection jumps into him and before Ramanga can do any real damage to the other Dracula's, Vlad with the power of 1000 bad vampires, walks out of the mirror and instantly opens the Praedictum Impaver for the first time, proving himself to be the Chosen One. He then tells Ramanga that the vampire's time was coming. Note: First appearance of Ramanga.
35	8	"Bad Vlad: Part 2"	22 November 2011
Vlad has now become an evil and bloodthirsty vampire. He no longer has a conscience or care for the Count or Ingrid. He causes destruction throughout the school on the day of an inspection. At Miss McCauley's request the Count tries to persuade Vlad to hold back for a day but he ignores him. The Count and Renfield trap Vlad until he promises to obey the Count until he's eighteen. Vlad promises he will but after he is released, traps the Count instead and puts a necklace of garlic around the Count's neck, leaving him slowly dying. Ingrid sets out to stake Vlad before he gets too powerful, but he easily stops her and pushes her outside into the sunlight. Throughout all this, Vlad tries to bite Erin but finds that he can't despite really trying to. In the end Erin is the only one who can appeal to his good side to overcome his bad side, causing his reflection to be thrown out of his body. Erin saves Ingrid who is in a catatonic state since Vlad threw her into the sunlight. Vlad also saves the Count, after he is separated from his bad side, by taking of the garlic necklace and giving the Count a bit of blood to drink. Vlad goes to the blood mirror knowing he can't stay apart from his reflection forever. After Vlad and his evil side battle, he must come to terms with what is in him and disappears from the school.
36	9	"Therapy"	28 November 2011
Ingrid has hit rock bottom since her near-death experience. On the advice of Miss McCauley, she has a therapy session. The therapist asks Ingrid to look into her past to find herself. In this session with the therapist, Joan, Ingrid talks about her past in Stokely including her memories about Will. The session works and Ingrid is back, but is pretending to be a caring, loving sister and daughter. Vlad is missing and the Count and Bertrand bicker over whose fault it is. Erin leaves because Vlad, her protector, is no longer there. She is persuaded by a desperate Ryan to return to make one last attempt at finding a cure. As she is sneaking a look in the Praedictum Impaver, she gets scratched by one of the fingers and the blood produces text in the book.
37	10	"The Return"	29 November 2011
Vlad returns to the school and is changed – he has matured and grown into a leader. The slayers Jonno and Mina Van Helsing arrive at the school, but it appears they are unaware of the existence of vampires and that their mind wipes from four years ago are still in place or at least that's what the Draculas and Bertrand think. Vlad sets out to test them. Ingrid has to go along with Jonno's false memory that they used to be a couple. Vlad and Bertrand set up the Count in a potentially fatal situation, to test if Mina is telling the truth. The Count is furious and feels ousted from Vlad's affections. He has his own plan – he manipulates Bertrand into slaying Ingrid, so Vlad will believe it was the Van Helsings, but the Count tricks Bertrand and shows Vlad what the Count wants him to think about Bertrand (obviously after Vlad stops this scheme just in time). Erin confronts the slayers (Van Helsings) with who they really are and they tell her that they came here to get revenge for the death of Eric, husband and father of the Van Helsings who was killed unknowingly by a vampire because of Vlad's mind wipe. They also tell her that they were sent by the slayers guild and that they were told about Erin and what happened to her brother Ryan but do not know where he is since they last met him. At last they tell her that she only has two weeks to deal with the Draculas, or they are coming back to get them with their super weapon.
38	11	"Hit Chicks"	5 December 2011
Ingrid is pretending she is sweetness and light when really she plans to take charge. She turns a visiting team of netball players into vampires and tells them their mission is to wipe out Vlad. Erin now trusts Vlad and shows him the text in the Praedictum Impaver. It is a foreign language (Aramaic) which Vlad cannot read, but Bertrand or his dad may understand it. Erin shows Vlad how the text appeared but bagged blood doesn't work. She goes to use her own fresh blood, but Vlad stops her. He doesn't want blood spilled to reveal his destiny. While at school, one of Ingrid's recruits try to destroy Vlad but ends up getting staked herself. After Erin talks to Vlad about what was in the book, he then tells who it was about. Then another one of Ingrid's recruits tries to stake Vlad again but fails after walking in sunlight. Erin finds one of Ingrid's recruits in Vlad's room, but lies to her and she ends up dead, due to the fact that she went inside Vlad's coffin and was killed by a UV bomb which you needed to kill Vlad. Wanting to help Ryan, Erin creeps into the room to put more text in the book. Bertrand finds her there and discovers she is a breather. Vlad defends her but when it comes out she is a slayer, he is heartbroken and doesn't believe Erin when she tries to tell him that Ingrid is trying to kill him. Vlad, now considerably angry, tells her to leave. Note: First reappearance of Jonathen and Mina Van Helsing.
39	12	"Blood Loyalties: Part 1"	6 December 2011
A banished Erin goes to the Van Helsings. After passing a lie detector test, she then has to dust a vampire to prove herself – her brother, Ryan. When Erin discovers the weapon and plan to destroy the Draculas, she sends a warning letter to Vlad, explaining that the slayers have a super weapon to use against him, a giant sun lamp. He consults his family and they tell him not to trust her, but he manages to persuade the Count to go with him to the slayer base. Erin frees Ryan with the ash of a Count and Jonno, only to find he is fully changed and loyal to Ingrid. Vlad visits with the Count to destroy the weapon and Erin lets them into the slayer's base and they disable the weapon. Jonno finds out Erin has betrayed him. Vlad persuades Erin to run, but as she is leaving she is kidnapped by a rebellious Bertrand who has also stolen the Praedictum Impaver, believing that Erin's blood will release the last words of the book.
40	13	"All for One: Part 2"	12 December 2011
Ryan follows him and learns that slayer's blood creates text in the book and steals the book for Ingrid. Vlad senses Erin is in danger and when he gets to her she tells him about Bertrand, Ryan and the book. Renfield is kidnapped by Ingrid's posse but his blood does not open the book, and it transpires that only a slayer's blood can do that. Vlad takes control and commands the book to him, but Erin offers drops of her blood and the last page is filled. Sethius is released from the book, claiming that he is the Chosen One. He declares war on all breathers and enlists the help of Bertrand and Ingrid. However, Vlad decides that he doesn't believe in Sethius's way of dealing with things; by getting the Count's aid, offering Ingrid "the status she's always craved" and warning Bertrand he would surely be killed if he served Sethius, Vlad gets them on his side and they manage to turn Sethius into a pile of ash. As Vlad is talking to his family and the slayers, Bertrand takes some of Sethius' ashes and puts them in his pocket. Vlad also gets the slayers on his side by proposing a treaty of sorts stating that vampires will no longer feed off Breathers in return for no more slaying, to which Jonathan and Mina agree and the Count replies, "No fun!" Note: Last appearance of Zoltan.

=== Series 4 (2012) ===
No. overall	No. in season	Title	Original release date
41	1	"The Good, the Bad and the Undead"	29 October 2012
Vlad and his gang have 48 hours to ensure that all Vampires are off the street and are prepared to abide by peaceful co-existence between the Vampires and the Slayers. There are plenty of people who are hoping and plotting for Vlad's initiative to fail, not least the Count who is secretively in cahoots with Vampire High Council Member, Ramanga and High Council wannabe Ingrid, to bring the peaceful co-existence to its knees, when he's not fantasizing about his beloved Miss McCauley. In a last-ditch attempt to prove his plan can succeed, Vlad and Jonno arrange a Vampires vs Slayers football tournament. Note: First appearance of Malik Vaccaria.
42	2	"Revamped"	5 November 2012
Vlad's peace initiative hangs in the balance but with a lot of help from Jonno, Bertrand and Erin they manage to persuade all the lawless ferals, including the charismatic new boy Malik, and Ryan to turn up to SCRAP school at Garside. The school will help them wean off biting and onto a breather friendly alternative - soya blood, a victory as far as Vlad is concerned until the Count bowls a googly: to win favour with the High Council and the ancient vampire clans, Vlad must marry Adze, Ramanga's daughter.
43	3	"Storm in a Blood Cup"	12 November 2012
Adze arrives at Garside and much to Erin's chagrin, she is beautiful. Vlad doesn't appear to notice, as he's too busy scheming on how he can get out of the arrangement. However, Ramanga and Adze are plotting to get rid of the only person who might put a spoke in the wheel - Erin. A direct assault would be too provocative so they plan a smear campaign centring on Ryan, but it backfires and opportunes Vlad with a moment of reprise. Note: First appearance of Adze and Elizabeta Vaccaria.
44	4	"The Crown of Ludlaw Erant"	19 November 2012
Malik is secretly meeting with a mystery being and his loyalty to the Draculas is not so clear cut. Ingrid strikes a deal with Ramanga. She will give spy on Vlad and Erin in return for Ramanga's support in her bid to be the first woman on the High Council. Vlad is under duress not just because he has to find a way out of his forthcoming marriage to Adze but also because finding enough blood to supply his SCRAP vampires is not as easy he and Jonno initially thought. Meanwhile, The Count has agreed to Ms McCauley's suggestion that they elect a member of the SCRAPs onto Garside school's senate. When the reluctant Ryan wins, instead of Malik it begins to look like it was a fit up - this escalates to downright suspicion when Ryan collapses and dies after being crowned with Mortar board. Note: Last appearance of Ryan.
45	5	"Murderer in the Midst"	26 November 2012
Bertrand is put in charge of finding Ryan's murderer. The problem is everyone has a motive, but he begins to suspect that someone as yet unknown has them running round in circles, especially when his proof miraculously disappears. Vlad is impatient and wants hard proof. Erin is becoming increasingly isolated and worried that rather than letting Vlad get on with his peaceful co-existence initiative he is being distracted and made vulnerable by her presence. She makes a decision to leave, as it is the only way for Vlad's vision for breather and biters to succeed, and Vlad is torn about it.
46	6	"Bloodbound"	27 November 2012
The day of the bloodbinding arrives. A reluctant and nervous Vlad prepares to stand by his word and marry Adze. Ramanga proposes to an astonished Ingrid but soon wishes he hasn't and Bertrand uncovers Ramanga's secret gift to Adze - Erin. Vlad and Bertrand rush to her aid but Adze uses the dark magic and Erin is fatally wounded.
47	7	"Do the Bite Thing"	3 December 2012
Erin's life hangs in the balance and Vlad keeps a vigil at her bedside. Despite everyone's advice Vlad bites Erin as a means of stopping her dying. The Count and Malik seek revenge on Ramanga for threatening Vlad and trying to overturn the House of Dracula. Malik reveals to the Count that he is his son.
48	8	"Loyalty's for Breathers"	4 December 2012
The Count decides to challenge his sons to fight for their position as his rightful heir, and Vlad reluctantly agrees.
49	9	"Sun and Heir"	10 December 2012
Bertrand is convinced that the Shapeshifter is linked to Malik. In retaliation the Shapeshifter creates chaos by manipulating the Dracula clan: first she engineers a near death situation for the Count and Malik in the hope that it will provide the impetus to bond as father and son. Then she impersonates Bertrand and invites Adze and Mina to Garside, where their meeting degenerates into a confrontation. The peaceful coexistence is teetering on a knife edge and Vlad has never felt so alone. Note: Last appearance of Adze and Bertrand Du Fortunesa.
50	10	"Whatever It Takes"	11 December 2012
Vlad's problems appear to escalate even though he's dusted Bertrand. The Slayers Guild anticipate an end to the ceasefire and plan to attack. The only way they will deviate from their plan is if Vlad sacrifices Erin who is still biting. Ingrid is unaware of the Slayers' conditions and prepares for all out war, galvanising her troops at Garside. The Count is a little distracted by a new teacher who has the attention of his beloved McCauley.
51	11	"Bootiful Breathers"	17 December 2012
Vlad is still in denial about Bertrand's death and is lying to everyone about the mind wipe of the slayers. Ingrid's bid for a position on the Vampire High Council fails due to an outsider, and she suspects foul play. With the help of Renfield she finds out the truth - and reveals to Vlad what vampires are capable of, if left un-policed by the slayers. Vlad resolves to reverse the mind wipe, while Malik helps the Count to get rid of his love rival.
52	12	"Cuckoo in the Nest: Part 1"	18 December 2012
Vlad decides that he must make amends for the bad decisions he has recently made, but when the Count finds out his actions, he disinherits Vlad and formally makes Malik the Dracula heir. Vlad comes face-to-face with the Shapeshifter. Note: Last appearance of Jonathan and Mina Van Helsing.
53	13	"Kiss of Death: Part 2"	18 December 2012
Vlad and Ingrid join forces to capture the Shapeshifter, but since she can assume the physical appearance of anybody, they are initially at a loss as to know who she is. As bait for Elisabeta, they capture and torture Malik to force her to show herself, banking on the fact that even the most twisted of mothers still care about their young. Note: Last appearance of Erin Noble, Barry "Wolfie" Westerna, first and only appearance in an illusion of Arta Dracula.

=== Series 5 (2014) ===
No. overall	No. in season	Title	Original release date
54	1	"Fight or Flight"	13 January 2014
Desperate for Vlad to stay, the Count resorts to bribery when he learns that Vlad is only planning a brief stopover back home during his worldwide travels. Garside Grange is no longer a school. When the youngster starts to feel ill, Renfield's search for a cure uncovers a surprising family secret.
55	2	"Who's the Daddy?"	20 January 2014
Vlad's curiosity is aroused when Renfield lets slip that he's suffering from a breather cold. His suspicions are compounded when, following a violent cough, Vlad is exposed to direct sunlight and only suffers a mild singeing. Meanwhile, Ingrid tries to climb the ladder at the VHC by dusting her competition.
56	3	"Flesh and Blood"	27 January 2014
When the Count converts Garside into a vampire-themed hotel, Vlad invites his breather mother to stay without revealing his true identity. Note: First appearance of Sally and George Giles.
57	4	"One Bitten, Twice Shy"	3 February 2014
Vlad persuades Sally and George to stay a little while at Garside, as he would like to get to know them better. Despite his pleas for his vampire family to pretend to be normal, Ingrid can't help herself and chaos soon descends.
58	5	"Warning Shadows"	10 February 2014
A mysterious new visitor at Garside warns the Draculas that they are the next target of Ramanga's fearsome Shadow Warriors. Note: First appearance of Asan.
59	6	"The Enemy Within"	17 February 2014
The count is reveling in his victory over the Shadow Warriors when he gets even more good news. The Dracula family celebrations are cut short by another unexpected arrival. An "Unordinary" bat appears at the castle, and strangely, at the time, every biter vampire gets infected with a strange green moss.
60	7	"Nemesis Rising"	24 February 2014
Malik finds a surprising ally in his mission to rescue his mother from the Blood Mirror. Vlad is delighted when a friend he met travelling pays him a visit. Note: First appearance of Talitha, last appearance of Elizabeta Vaccaria.
61	8	"Open House"	3 March 2014
Renfield arranges an open house viewing to sell Garside but thanks to Asan and Shango there are a few surprises in store for the Draculas and their potential breather buyers.
62	9	"The Bodyguard"	10 March 2014
Vlad worries that his half-human identity will be revealed when the VHC appoints him a personal bodyguard.
63	10	"Blood Match"	17 March 2014
The family's bedtime routine descends into chaos when they are suddenly set upon by enemies old and new - and Renfield will be sweeping up the dust of at least one fallen vampire before the end of the night. Note: Last appearance of Ramanga and Malik.
64	11	"Bite Me"	24 March 2014
Ingrid decides to make a final bid for power as Vlad is close to turning 18, but she underestimates Renfield, who will not give up until he is bitten.
65	12	"The Darkest Hour: Part 1" (Note: Original broadcast as 60 minute episode with Part 2.)	31 March 2014
Vlad decides whether to be a human or a vampire on his 18th birthday, as the combined forces of the vengeful Ramangas, the power-crazy VHC and the Magister Maleficorum threaten to wipe out his family forever.
66	13	"The Darkest Hour: Part 2" (Note: Original broadcast as 60 minute episode with Part 1.)	31 March 2014
As the sun rises on his 18th birthday, Vlad wishes to become human, but with the Blood Seed flourishing and his family under attack, it's certainly not going to be an easy decision to make.
