= Geelong Keys =

Archaeological find at Limeburners Point, Australia

The Geelong Keys were a set of five keys discovered in 1847 at Limeburners Point, on the southern shore of Corio Bay, near Geelong, Victoria, Australia. Charles La Trobe, Superintendent of the Port Phillip District and a keen amateur geologist, was examining marine deposits revealed by excavations associated with lime production in the area. A worker showed him two of a set of five keys he claimed to have found the day before, in a layer of shells 15 feet (4.6 m) down an excavation for a lime kiln, which was about 40 feet (12 m) from the shoreline. La Trobe was fascinated by the find and believed, from their appearance, that the keys were between 100 and 150 years old (~1700-1750 AD).

Since the 1802 expedition of Matthew Flinders is the earliest proven European presence in the vicinity, writer Kenneth McIntyre has suggested the keys may have originated with some earlier European explorers of the region, possibly the Portuguese. McIntyre has connected the discovery of the Geelong Keys with the presence of the so-called Mahogany Ship, further west on Victoria's Shipwreck Coast, claiming that it could be another possible relic of early Portuguese exploration.

The editor of the Geelong Advertiser at the time, James Harrison, noted that metal objects were often embedded in new diggings to detect the leaching of payable metal. For instance, a copper oxide coating on the keys would suggest the presence of copper. Ronald Gunn, a friend of La Trobe, told the Royal Society of Victoria in September 1849 that he had gone to Geelong to investigate the discovery. On questioning the limeburner he found that the keys had not, in fact, been dug out of the shell layer but were found with shells at the bottom of the pit. It was only assumed that they had fallen from the upper layer. In practice they could have fallen from any layer, including the top of the excavation.

The keys were the subject of two pamphlets published by the Royal Society of Victoria in the 1870s. The first of these suggested that the depth at which the keys allegedly lay indicated an age closer to 200–300 years. The second pamphlet repudiated this claim and was based on an interview with a limeburner, who said that the keys may have been dropped down a hole to that depth. Research in the 1980s by geologist Edmund Gill, and engineer and historian Peter Alsop, showed the age of the deposit in which the keys were supposedly found was between 2330 and 2800 years. According to Gill and Alsop, La Trobe's error is quite understandable, given that in 1847 most people thought the earth was only 6000 years old.

The keys themselves, and all original drawings of them, have been lost. By the time they were shown to La Trobe, one had been lost by the limeburners' children and one had been given to a passer-by. La Trobe gave one to his friend Ronald Gunn and the other two went to the Melbourne Mechanics' Institute, from which they were lost after the institute went bankrupt.

The keys are referred to in the children's books The Voyage of the Poppykettle and The Unchosen Land by Robert Ingpen. In the stories, the keys are used as ballast in a clay-pot ship sailed by migrant Peruvian gnomes. The stories were so popular in Ingpen's hometown, Geelong, that a fountain and an annual Poppykettle Festival celebrate the mythical landing of the "hairy Peruvians".
