= Michael Fitzgerald Page =

British-born Australian writer

Michael Fitzgerald Page AM
- Born: 22 February 1922; Chester, Cheshire, England
- Died: 3 November 2014 (aged 92); Blackwood, Adelaide, Australia
- Occupations: Writer, editor, advertiser, merchant sailor
- Writing career
- Notable awards: Member of the Order of Australia for services to literature 1999

Michael Fitzgerald Page AM (2 February 1922 – 3 November 2014) was a British-born Australian writer, editor, advertising executive, World War II veteran and merchant sailor. For his "services to the book publishing industry and to literature as a writer, and through the encouragement and support of upcoming Australian authors" he was made a Member of the Order of Australia in 1999. He died in Blackwood, Adelaide in November 2014 at the age of 92.

== Early life ==
Page was born in Chester, Cheshire, England in February 1922. His father had been posted to Greymouth, New Zealand when his mother returned to England to give birth. He lived with his Mother, older brother and two sisters in Chester. His father Commander Sherwood Page VRD was a merchant mariner and Great War Royal Navy Volunteer Reserve officer. His older brother Charles was an officer in the Berkshire Regiment and served in India, Burma and the South-West Pacific during the Second World War. Michael Page was educated at Teignmouth, South Devon, and began training as a Merchant Navy signals officer and was at sea by the outbreak of the Second World War.

== War service ==
Page served for duration of the Second World War in the Merchant Navy (United Kingdom) as a Radio Officer serving in the Battle of the Atlantic, the Mediterranean theatre, the North Sea and the Indian Ocean. In 1941 he was transferred from the MV British Fusilier to the island of Aruba for an emergency appendectomy, and then later in 1941 whilst aboard the Norwegian flagged MV Jenny he contracted malaria whilst on the West Africa coast. He finished the war as part of the British Commonwealth Occupation Force in Kure, Japan. After this he spent the next two years as part of the Royal Fleet Auxiliary in Singapore. Page continued his service with the British Merchant Navy, retiring from sea service in 1951 in Australia.

== Career ==
After visiting Australia, he migrated to Adelaide with his wife and first child in 1952. He first started writing whilst at sea but did not publish his first book until he had resigned from the Merchant Navy in 1951. He became a copywriter in an Adelaide advertising agency, working for Jackson Waine and Eric Ring, and eventually its manager.

Page was a prolific writer, and many of his fictional novels were nautical themed, set either in the Georgian and Victorian era, or the Second World War. He also regularly wrote about Australia during the colonial era. Page's non-fiction works often related to Australian history, notably during the colonial era and early post federation. His most successful book was The Encyclopedia of Things That Never Were, illustrated by frequent collaborator Robert Ingpen. It was published in 1985 and sold over 70,000 copies. It still continues in print to this day.

In addition to being an author, Michael Page joined the Adelaide-based publisher Rigby Limited in January 1967 as its Publishing Manager. While at Rigby, he developed their fiction offering, including publishing works by Colin Thiele. After Rigby was purchased by James Hardie he took 'early retirement' in February 1982, 'hoping to make a living from freelance editing and writing'. All staff at Rigby were dismissed in 1984.

== Honours and awards ==
In 1999 he was made a member of the Order of Australia for "services to the book publishing industry and to literature as a writer, and through the encouragement and support of upcoming Australian authors". His investiture was held at Government House in Adelaide.

For his war service in the Merchant Navy he has been awarded the 1939–45 Star, Atlantic Star, Africa Star, Italy Star and the War Medal 1939–1945

== Fiction writing ==
- Encyclopedia of Things That Never Were: Creatures, Places, and People (1986) illustrated by Robert Ingpen; Australia title Out of This World: The Complete Book of Fantasy
- My Anastasia (2004) published by Robert Hale
- The Great Bullocky Race (1984) illustrated by Robert Ingpen
- Worldly Dogs (1986) illustrated by Robert Ingpen
- The Runaway Punt (1976) illustrated by Robert Ingpen published by Rigby Ltd
- Aussie Battlers (1982) illustrated by Robert Ingpen
- Mr Dohnt's Notice Garden (1988) illustrated by Michael Atchison published by Collins
- Sailor of Fortune (1989) Robert Hale
- Sealed Orders (1988) Robert Hale
- Captain Blaze (1987) Robert Hale
- Blood of an Englishman (1985) Robert Hale
- A Nasty Little War (1979) published by Rigby Ltd
- Fortunes of War (1972) published by Robert Hale
- All in the Same Boat (1970) published by Robert Hale
- The Seizing of the Brig (1969) published by Robert Hale
- A Yankee Skipper (1968) published by Robert Hale
- Magpie Island (1964) published by Robert Hale
- The Innocent Bystander etc (1957) published by Robert Hale
- Spare the Vanquished (1952) published by Robert Hale

== Non-fiction writing ==
- The Prime Ministers of Australia
- Bradman: The Illustrated Biography (1983) published by Macmillan
- The Flying Doctor Story, 1928 78
- Turning Points in the Making of Australia
- Colonial South Australia: Its People and Buildings (1985) illustrated by Robert Ingpen
- The Making of Australians (1987) illustrated by Robert Ingpen
- A Sea With Many Islands (1952) published by Robert Hale
