= Young Dracula =

British teenage horror drama television series

- Young Dracula series 1–2 title card
- Genre: Teen drama Supernatural drama Horror; Comedy; Sitcom (series 1–2)
- Created by: Danny Robins; Dan Tetsell
- Starring: Keith-Lee Castle; Gerran Howell; Clare Thomas; Simon Ludders; Andy Bradshaw
- Composers: John Rea (series 1); Nick Lloyd (series 2–3); Simon Rogers (series 4); Michael J McEvoy (series 5)
- Country of origin: United Kingdom
- Original language: English
- No. of series: 5
- No. of episodes: 66 (list of episodes)

Production
- Executive producer: Josephine Ward
- Producers: Mia Jupp (series 1–2); Lis Steele (series 3–4); Melanie Halsall (series 3); Candida Julian–Jones (series 5)
- Production locations: Glamorgan (series 1–2); Liverpool (series 3–5)
- Editors: Christian Blood; Emyr Jenkins; Robert Douglas-Reeves; Nick Holes; Jane Murrell; Pedr James; Angharad Owen; Bleddyn Rhys
- Camera setup: Videotape (filmized) (series 1–2); RED (series 3–5); Multi-camera
- Running time: 30 minutes
- Production company: BBC Cymru Wales

Original release
- Network: CBBC
- Release: 21 September 2006 – 31 March 2014

Young Dracula is a British children's horror drama comedy television series which aired on CBBC, loosely based on Young Dracula, a 2002 children's book by Michael Lawrence. It is also based on the epistolary novel Dracula, written by Bram Stoker and published in 1897.

The first two series follow the Dracula family, a family of vampires: Vladimir (Vlad), his father Count Dracula, and sister Ingrid. Having lived in Transylvania, they move to Stokely, a small town in Wales after various incidents involving angry peasant mobs. It was filmed in various locations around Wales, including Ysgol Gyfun Gymraeg Glantaf, Caerphilly Castle, Tretower Court and parts of Llantrisant. Directed by Joss Agnew, the first series was broadcast in 2006 and the second series, which started in late 2007, concluded in early 2008.

The third series, commissioned three years after the second, sees Vlad and the Count flee both vampires and slayers, while the Count is determined that Vlad should fulfil his destiny to become "The Chosen One". This series was filmed in Liverpool during 2011, in various locations including the disused Margaret Bevan School, Croxteth Hall and Stanley Docks. It began airing on 31 October 2011. The fourth series follows on from season three's predicament and had a new director, airing on 29 October 2012. Young Dracula was renewed for a fifth and final series in 2013, with filming beginning in April. The hour long finale, "The Darkest Hour", aired on 31 March 2014.

Young Dracula was nominated for Best Children's Drama in the 2008 BAFTA Awards and has been nominated for several other awards. An additional series, the Young Dracula Files, began broadcasting on 24 October 2012, in which the main characters tell their stories of the past. It was primarily hosted by the character Bertrand Du Fortunesa, played by Cesare Taurasi.

== Characters ==
Character	Portrayed by	Series				
Character	Portrayed by	1	2	3	4	5
Vladimir Dracula	Gerran Howell	Main	Main	Main	Main	Main
Count Dracula	Keith-Lee Castle	Main	Main	Main	Main	Main
Ingrid Dracula	Clare Thomas	Main	Main	Main	Main	Main
Renfield	Simon Ludders	Main	Main	Main	Main	Main
Zoltan	Andy Bradshaw	Main	Main	Main		
Robin Branagh	Craig Roberts	Main	Main			
Chloe Branagh	Lucy Borja-Edwards	Main	Main			
Eric Van Helsing	Terence Maynard	Main	Main			
Jonathan "Jonno" Van Helsing	Terry Haywood	Main	Main	Main	Main	
Mina Van Helsing	Jo-Anne Knowles		Main	Main	Main	
Wolfie Westernra	Lorenzo Rodriguez			Main	Main	
Alex McCauley	Letty Butler			Main	Main	
Bertrand du Fortunesa	Cesare Taurasi			Main	Main	
Erin Noble	Sydney Rae White			Main	Main	
Malik Vaccaria	Richard Southgate				Main	Main
Sally Giles	Laura Howard					Main
George Giles	Bella Band					Main
Asan Ramanga	Quinton Nyirenda					Main
Talitha	Eleanor Gecks					Main
Piers	Mark Rowley					Main

=== Main ===
- Gerran Howell as Vlad Dracula, a reluctant vampire and the son and heir of Count Dracula, who later discovers he is the Chosen One and is a half-human dimidius. He initially resists his destiny, fighting to find any way to become fully human, but ultimately embraces his full power in order to protect his family and friends and bring peace between humans and vampires.
- Keith-Lee Castle as Count Dracula, the infamous 600-year-old vampire known as the 'Prince of Darkness', who often behaves maliciously and has no qualms about drinking blood, killing his enemies, and abusing Ingrid and Renfield. He has a softer side, which grows due to Vlad's influence and his fondness for certain humans, particularly Alex McCauley. Despite his reputation, Dracula displays frequent incompetence and weakened abilities due to his old age, but can prove formidable in battle on occasion.
- Clare Thomas as Ingrid Dracula, Dracula's malicious daughter and Vlad's elder sister, who is neglected by her father and underestimated by the vampire community, making her determined to prove herself. She later seizes control of Stokely Castle and tries to kill her family, but is forced to seek refuge with them after being attacked by slayers years later. Ingrid eventually becomes a member of the Vampire High Council and the owner of Garside Grange. Her name may be inspired by Ingrid Pitt.
- Craig Roberts as Robin Branaugh (series 1-2), Vlad's human best friend and confidante, who is obsessed with vampires and wants to become one himself. When Vlad discovers he is the Chosen One, he mind-wipes Robin, leaving him with no memory of vampires.
- Terence Maynard as Eric Van Helsing (series 1-2), a woodwork teacher and inept slayer whose relentless pursuit of vampires estranged him from his wife Mina, and frequently embarrasses his son Jonno. Van Helsing has never actually slain a vampire prior to meeting Dracula, against whom he wages a feud. He later slays two vampires in a final conflict with the Dracula family, before Vlad mind-wipes him, leaving him with no memory of vampires. This renders Van Helsing defenceless against a later vampire attack, and he is killed.
- Terry Haywood as Jonno Van Helsing (series 1-2 and 4; guest series 3), Van Helsing's son who initially does not believe in vampires, but later helps his father fight the Draculas. Jonno and his mother Mina take over the Slayers' Guild after Van Helsing is apparently killed by vampires, but Vlad brokers a truce and works with Jonno to try to bring peace.
- Simon Ludders as Percival Renfield, Dracula's long-suffering servant. He is slow-witted and repulsively unhygienic, but is also a genius scientist and is deeply loyal to the Dracula family, mostly due to his misguided belief that Dracula will one day bite him. He eventually gains the bite through coercion, becoming a particularly incompetent vampire.
- Beth Robert as Elizabeth Branaugh (series 1-2), Robin's perpetually cheerful mother, whom Dracula covets.
- Aneirin Hughes as Graham Branaugh (series 1-2), Robin's father, a plumber who dislikes Dracula.
- Lucy Borja as Chloe Branaugh (series 1-2), Robin's younger sister, who possesses prodigious intelligence and soon learns that the Draculas are vampires. She is Vlad's friend until her family are almost killed by vampires at Dracula's hunt ball, after which she refuses to go to the castle.
- Ben McGregor as Ian Branaugh (series 1-2), Robin's brother, who bullies him and is besotted with Ingrid, much like his twin Paul.
- Luke Bridgeman as Paul Branaugh (series 1-2), Robin's brother, who bullies him and is besotted with Ingrid, much like his twin Ian.
- Andy Bradshaw as Zoltan (series 1-3), a Hellhound who was stuffed and reanimated by Dracula, and serves as Vlad's pet and confidante during his childhood.
- Jo-Anne Knowles as Mina Van-Helsing (series 2 and 4; guest series 3), introduced as the kind and attractive mother of Jonno but is fed up with her husband, Eric Van Helsing and his obsession with vampires. She later believes in vampires and takes over the Slayers' Guild with her son, Jonno, after Van Helsing is killed by vampires.
- Sydney Rae White as Erin Noble (series 3-4), a slayer who disguises herself as a vampire and infiltrates Garside Grange to try to cure her brother Ryan's vampirism. She develops a relationship with Vlad and works with him to bring peace, but after being fatally wounded by Adze, Erin is turned into a vampire by Vlad to save her, for which she hates him. She allies with Elizabeta and Malik to destroy the Draculas, and is later killed by Ramanga's Shadow Warriors in Paris.
- Cesare Taurasi as Bertrand De Fortunessa (series 3-4), a vampire who travels to Garside to tutor Vlad in the use of his powers. Initially dubious of Vlad's plan for peace, Bertrand betrays him to Sethius, but realises Vlad's plan is the only hope for vampires and humans, and becomes devoted to helping him fulfil his goals. However Elizabeta Vaccaria frames Bertrand for further betrayal, for which Vlad kills him.
- Letty Butler as Alex McCauley (series 3-4), Garside Grange's headmistress, with whom Dracula falls in love. She eventually discovers that the Draculas are vampires, but Vlad erases her memories of this and she leaves as Garside is closed.
- Tom Gibbons as Ryan Noble (series 3-4), Erin's brother, a slayer who is bitten by Ingrid. Previously protective of his sister, he becomes a selfish vampire who allies with Ingrid and later Malik. Ryan is murdered by Elizabeta Vaccaria as part of a plan to drive Erin and Vlad apart.
- Lorenzo Rodriguez as Wolfie Westenra (series 3-4), Vlad and Ingrid's half-brother, a vampire-werewolf hybrid. He lives with Dracula for a few months before returning to his mother, Magda Westenra.
- Richard Southgate as Malik Vaccaria (series 4-5), a vampire who believes Dracula is his father, and works with his mother Elizabeta to become Dracula's new heir and then kill him. Thwarted, Malik later learns Dracula is not his father, and is killed by Ramanga.
- Robbie Gee as Ramanga (series 4; guest series 3 and 5), a Vampire High Council member who allies with Dracula to undermine the peaceful coexistence. He has Vlad betrothed to his daughter Adze, as part of a scheme to have her gain immense power from Vlad's first bite before assassinating the Chosen One, but the plan is foiled and Dracula rips out Ramanga's fangs to humiliate him. Ramanga later travels to the Shadow Realm and is driven insane, attempting to steal Vlad's power in a dark magic ritual, but he is killed by Dracula.
- Nathasha Stokes as Adze Ramanga (series 4), Ramanga's daughter, who is betrothed to Vlad. She covets Vlad's first bite, believing it will bestow her with immense power, but the plot is thwarted. Replacing her father on the high council, Adze is later slain by Mina Van Helsing.
- Laura Howard as Sally Giles (series 5), Vlad's human mother, an artist. Vlad tracks her down, revealing himself as a vampire, but is eventually forced to erase her memories of his existence to protect her after he achieves his full power.
- Eleanor Gecks as Talitha Roquelaire (series 5), a peace-loving spiritualist vampire and the daughter of high council security chief Roquelaire. She travels with Vlad as his undercover bodyguard, and they later fall in love and begin a relationship.
- Amron Adams as Shango Ramanga (series 5), Ramanga's older son, who seeks revenge on the Draculas for his father's humiliation and death. After making several attempts to destroy them, Shango forms a truce with the Draculas during the battle against the Blood Seed.
- Quinton Nyirenda as Asan Ramanga (series 5), Ramanga's younger son, who infiltrates the Draculas' home to exact revenge for his father's death. He grows reluctant to betray the Draculas after befriending them.
- Bella Band as George Giles (series 5), Vlad's human half-sister, an aspiring archaeologist. Vlad is later forced to erase her memories of his existence to protect her after he achieves his full power.

Series 1

After their father bit too many residents in their own Transylvania, Vladimir and Ingrid Dracula were compelled to move to Britain. For Vlad, it is a realisation of a dream and a step closer to the normal world that he so desperately wants. Keeping his family's secret will be a full-time job though, what with a bloodsucking father, a talking wolf, a servant who smells like mouse droppings, and a vampire sister. Fortunately for Vlad, Robin Branaugh proves to be a reliable friend and ally. Robin wishes he did, but he doesn't reside in a castle. He is not required to wear a cloak, yet he does.

Series 2

Count Dracula is aware that slayers exist in Stokely as a result of the events at the Hunt Ball. Vlad must take all necessary measures to thwart his father's search for them. The appearance of Ivan, the Count's American brother, and Boris and Olga, Vlad and Ingrid's relatives, complicates matters further. Boris, his cousin, is set to complete his change.

Series 3

The third season of the show picks up four years after the conclusion of series 2, when Ingrid gained control of the Dracula castle and vowed retribution on Stokely for killing her boyfriend Will. Since then, the Count and Vlad have escaped, and while Ingrid also makes a comeback, they decide to buy a school to hide from the slayers and vampires that are pursuing them.

As opposed to the first two series, the plot in this one is not entirely focused on Vlad. The Count, Renfield, and Wolfie (the son of Magda and Patrick from an earlier series) are involved in further subplots. The balance of power has also altered; despite the fact that the Count is Vlad's regent and so has authority over him, Vlad is now more inclined to challenge his father.

Ingrid, on the other hand, is depicted as being more inclined to cooperate with the Count, and the two appear to have reached a tense ceasefire.

For the majority of the series, Bertram disagrees with Vlad because he thinks Vlad should concentrate solely on his duty as the chosen one and is critical of his connection with Erin.

Production

The television show left Wales and began shooting in and around Liverpool. The week of 9 May 2011, saw the start of the series' rehearsals, and the following week saw the start of its three-month filming schedule. The shooting was completed in August. On 31 October, the recently edited series was made available.

Series 4

The fourth season consists of 13 episodes total, with each one lasting roughly 30 minutes. Filming started in mid-April 2012, taking place in Liverpool, and the first episode aired on Monday, 29 October.

Series 5

Two months after the conclusion of series 4, Vlad, who is nearly eighteen, has returned from recent trips. He has learned what his father has been keeping a secret from him for the past 18 years. Ingrid has at last been elected to the High Council, but she is having trouble embracing her new position as Minister of Catering. Although her wicked intentions are yet unknown, it seems that she is attempting to depose Morgan. Ingrid has changed how she uses technology to compete with her rivals. With Asan's assistance, Malik is back to protect his family from the Shadow Warriors.

Main characters

Vladimir "Vlad" Dracula

Vladimir "Vlad" Dracula is the son of Count Dracula and Sally Giles, the maternal elder half-brother of Georgina Giles, and the ex-sex partner of Erin. He is Ingrid Dracula's paternal younger half-brother. He is the Dracula throne's Chosen One and the next in line.

Ingrid Dracula

The oldest child of Count Dracula and Magda Westernra is Ingrid Dracula. She consistently exhibits a desire for her father's and brother's abilities throughout the entire series. She joined the Vampire High Council in season four, earning the enormous power she had always desired.

Count Dracula

A former lover of Magda Westenra, Sally Giles, and Elizabeta Vaccaria, Count Dracula is the father of Vladimir Dracula and Ingrid Dracula, the guardian of Wolfie, the son of Dracos Dracula and Mrs. Dracula, the brother of Ivan Dracula and Arta Dracula, and the uncle of Boris Dracula and Olga Dracula. He currently holds the throne of Dracula.

Percival Renfield

Renfield, a repulsive individual who enjoys nothing more than eating maggots and nothing less than "breathers", is the Draculas' servant and dogsbody.

== Episodes ==
Series	Episodes	Originally aired	
Series	Episodes	Series premiere	Series finale
1	14	21 September 2006	21 December 2006
2	13	2 November 2007	8 February 2008
3	13	31 October 2011	12 December 2011
4	13	29 October 2012	18 December 2012
5	13	13 January 2014	31 March 2014

== Ratings ==
Series	Episode No.	Airdate	Total viewers	CBBC weekly rank
1
1	1	21 September 2006	—N/a	—N/a
1	2	28 September 2006	—N/a	—N/a
1	3	5 October 2006	—N/a	—N/a
1	4	12 October 2006	—N/a	—N/a
1	5	19 October 2006	—N/a	—N/a
1	6	26 October 2006	—N/a	—N/a
1	7	2 November 2006	—N/a	—N/a
1	8	9 November 2006	—N/a	—N/a
1	9	16 November 2006	—N/a	—N/a
1	10	23 November 2006	—N/a	—N/a
1	11	30 November 2006	—N/a	—N/a
1	12	7 December 2006	—N/a	—N/a
1	13	14 December 2006	195,000	2
1	14	21 December 2006	194,000	6
2
2	1	2 November 2007	313,000	2
2	2	9 November 2007	210,000	—N/a
2	3	16 November 2007	269,000	6
2	4	23 November 2007	312,000	5
2	5	30 November 2007	270,000	6
2	6	7 December 2007	274,000	3
2	7	14 December 2007	335,000	2
2	8	21 December 2007	242,000	9
2	9	11 January 2008	307,000	4
2	10	18 January 2008	270,000	4
2	11	25 January 2008	201,000	—N/a
2	12	1 February 2008	137,000	—N/a
2	13	8 February 2008	291,000	8
3
3	1	31 October 2011	454,000	2
3	2	1 November 2011	539,000	1
3	3	7 November 2011	524,000	1
3	4	8 November 2011	437,000	3
3	5	14 November 2011	562,000	1
3	6	15 November 2011	508,000	2
3	7	21 November 2011	557,000	2
3	8	22 November 2011	573,000	1
3	9	28 November 2011	587,000	1
3	10	29 November 2011	520,000	4
3	11	5 December 2011	497,000	1
3	12	6 December 2011	389,000	5
3	13	12 December 2011	457,000	4
4
4	1	29 October 2012	407,000	8
4	2	5 November 2012	306,000	10
4	3	12 November 2012	332,000	9
4	4	19 November 2012	334,000	—N/a
4	5	26 November 2012	272,000	—N/a
4	6	27 November 2012	253,000	—N/a
4	7	3 December 2012	326,000	—N/a
4	8	4 December 2012	341,000	—N/a
4	9	10 December 2012	269,000	—N/a
4	10	11 December 2012	312,000	—N/a
4	11	17 December 2012	326,000	6
4	12	18 December 2012	314,000	8
4	13	18 December 2012	328,000	5

== Awards ==
- In 2007, Young Dracula won the Royal Television Society Award for Best Children's Drama, and the Welsh BAFTA for Best Children's Drama.
- In 2008, Young Dracula was nominated for the BAFTA Children's Drama Award.
- In 2012, Young Dracula was nominated for three awards at the Royal Television Society North West awards including Best Programme and for a Kids Vote BAFTA.

== Release ==
A DVD of the first series of Young Dracula was released on 15 October 2012.

A DVD of the second and third series of Young Dracula was released in 2013.

A DVD of the Series Four and Five were released on 9 October and 5 November 2014, respectively.

== See also ==
- Vampire film
- List of vampire television series
