= Young Dracula and Young Monsters =

Book by Michael Lawrence

- Author: Michael Lawrence
- Illustrator: Chris Mould
- Language: English
- Genre: Children's literature Fantasy novel
- Publisher: Barrington Stoke
- Publication date: September 2006
- Publication place: United Kingdom
- Media type: Print (paperback)
- Pages: 160
- ISBN: 9781842994450

Young Dracula and Young Monsters is a children's fantasy novel by Michael Lawrence, but is also known under two titles, as an omnibus edition of Young Dracula (2002) and Young Monsters (2003).

Young Dracula, loosely based on the premise explored in Bram Stoker's 1897 horror novel Dracula, follows the light-hearted adventures of Count Dracula's children. The story inspired the CBBC children's drama series of the same name.

Young Monsters is set at the Dr. Felix Furter School for Young Monsters, which has real monsters for pupils and teachers.

The book is published by Barrington Stoke, which specializes in books for undeveloped readers.
