= The Snow Queen (2005 film) =

2005 British television film

- DVD cover
- Based on: The Snow Queen by Hans Christian Andersen
- Written by: James Andrew Hall
- Directed by: Julian Dominic Gibbs
- Starring: Sydney Rae White; Juliet Stevenson; Patrick Stewart (voice)
- Music by: Paul K. Joyce
- Country of origin: United Kingdom
- Original language: English

Production
- Running time: 56 minutes
- Production companies: Amberwood Entertainment; SQ Productions
- Budget: 40,000,000$

Original release
- Network: BBC
- Release: 24 December 2005

The Snow Queen is a 2005 BBC television film commissioned by Michael Carrington that is based on the 1844 Hans Christian Andersen fairytale of The Snow Queen. Directed by Julian Gibbs, it stars Juliet Stevenson as Gerda's mother and the voice of Patrick Stewart as the raven.

This film was originally conceived as a vehicle for music composed by Paul K. Joyce. A set of operatic songs had been written by Paul K. Joyce for a concert at the Barbican Centre held in 2003. The songs narrated the fairytale of The Snow Queen and featured Sydney Rae White as the lead girl soprano, Juliet Stevenson as the narrator and the London Symphony Orchestra providing instrumentals. Due to the success of the concert, a full-fledged film was developed around the original songs, and Sydney White and Juliet Stevenson returned to contribute as actresses.

The songs written by Paul K. Joyce are central to the film, providing main narration throughout the story. Actual dialogue is sparse, and most notable is that the Snow Queen herself has no lines. The story also focuses entirely on Gerda's journey, with all others, including Kay himself, acting as supporting characters, but the character of the Raven (voiced by Patrick Stewart) was given more prominence as he follows Gerda throughout her entire journey.

== Plot ==
One night in winter, a young girl named Gerda sees a poor boy shivering in the cold. Gerda gives him a penny and one of her blankets, and her mother eventually takes the boy in, feeding and clothing him. The boy, whose name is Kay, strikes up a warm friendship with Gerda. One night, Gerda's mother tells the pair of the Snow Queen, who rules winter. Kay has seen her and fallen in love with her, so when she returns, he opens the window but something falls into his eye. From that moment on his heart is cold and he is cruel towards Gerda. Although Gerda is confused over Kay's sudden change of personality, she continues to try to mend their friendship.

One day, Kay goes sledding in the woods when he sees the Snow Queen. He hitches the rope of Gerda's sled to the Queen's sleigh and travels off with her. He does not return and when the sled is discovered in the river, he is presumed dead. Gerda mourns him by the river but is visited by a talking raven who tells her that Kay is not in the river.

Gerda decides to find Kay, travelling many miles and meeting many characters. First she meets talking flowers and a rose tells her that Kay is in a palace. Next she befriends a King, a princess and a prince in a golden palace. The King tells her "the legend of the looking glass". It is said that a wicked magician, thought to be the Devil himself, made a mirror that would distort the image of everyone who looked into it. When it broke, the fragments flew into the air causing more trouble. The King suspects that it is a shard of that mirror that fell into Kay's eye.

The King, the princess and the prince let Gerda wear a silk gown and the princess's fur cape for her journey and send her off in a golden carriage to the forest after saying their goodbyes and promising they will meet again. The raven goes along with her, but the carriage is ambushed by robbers and just as one of them is about to kill Gerda for her clothes, a robber girl saves her. After an argument, Gerda realises the robber girl is all alone and promises she will come back for her with Kay and be friends. The robber girl gives her a reindeer who knows the way and they make it to the North.

Gerda is exhausted and falls asleep in a blizzard, but an old Finland woman rescues her and her animals. She does not know the entire way to the Snow Queen but she gives them a way to the Laplander's home. Gerda, the raven and reindeer brave many dangerous obstacles and make it safely to the land of the Midnight Sun where the Laplander gives them a potion which flies them through the Northern Lights, but before they go, she warns them that the Snow Queen might freeze them to death.

They finally arrive at the Snow Queen's palace, but are charged at by her giant Polar Bears. Luckily, they shatter into pieces when the reindeer hits them with his antlers. Gerda decides to go on alone and finds Kay unconscious on a table of ice. The Snow Queen confronts Gerda, intent on destroying her, but Gerda remembers that the King said her strong and pure sisterly love for Kay would give her the bravery and power to defeat the Winter Witch, and the Snow Queen explodes into snow and purple light. Gerda wakes Kay with her warm tears, and Kay cries the shard of mirror out of his eye. The pair escape as the palace collapses around them, and the Snow Queen's spirit shoots into a cloud.

They make it back to their town and are reunited with Gerda's mother. The raven is seen flying away and the reindeer living in the North. Suddenly, a fragment of the evil mirror floats past the planet.

== Cast ==
- Juliet Stevenson as Gerda's Mother
- Sydney Rae White as Gerda
- Patrick Stewart as The Raven (voice)
- Kenneth Welsh as King
- Pax Baldwin as Kay
- Tiffany Amber Knight as The Snow Queen
- Colleen Williams as Mrs. Neilson
- Sasha Clements as Robber Girl
- Leah Cudmore as Princess
- Bradie Whetham as Prince
- Pascale Audrey as Robber Woman

== Production ==
All live-action scenes were filmed in bluescreen, with backgrounds fully rendered by CGI in order to give the film a storybook feel. Live-action filming was carried out in Toronto, Ontario, Canada, where according to Sydney and Juliet, the challenge lay in pretending that they were freezing cold while wearing multiple layers of clothing in a hot studio.

== Soundtrack ==
A full album recording of the songs was released on 31 October 2006. The track listing is as follows:

1. Sonnet XXV
2. The Snow Queen Overture
3. Hear Next Of Winter
4. The Mirror And Its Fragments
5. She Walks In Beauty
6. A Little Boy And A Little Girl
7. The Cold Earth Slept Below
8. Do Not Stand At My Grave And Weep
9. Remember
10. The Enchanted Flower Garden
11. Lullaby
12. The Prince And The Princess
13. In The Bleak Mid-Winter
14. The Little Robber Maiden
15. How Calm, How Beautiful, Comes On
16. The Lapland Woman And The Finland Woman
17. Do Not Stand At My Grave And Weep (reprise)
18. The Snow Queen's Palace
19. The Snow Queen Suite
