= Robert Ingpen =

Australian graphic designer and illustrator (born 1936)

- Born: 13 October 1936 (age 90); Geelong, Victoria, Australia
- Occupations: Graphic designer, illustrator, writer
- Writing career
- Period: 1958–present; children's books from mid-1970s
- Genres: Children's classics, folk tales, picture books
- Subjects: Science illustration; Australia environment, history
- Notable awards: Hans Christian Andersen Award for Illustration; 1986

Robert Roger Ingpen AM, FRSA (born 13 October 1936) is an Australian graphic designer, illustrator, and writer. For his "lasting contribution" as a children's illustrator he received the biennial, international Hans Christian Andersen Medal in 1986.

== Early life ==
Ingpen was born in Geelong, Victoria, and attended Geelong College to 1957. He graduated with a Diploma of Graphic Art from RMIT in 1958, where he studied with Harold Freedman.

== Career ==
In 1958, Ingpen was appointed by the Commonwealth Scientific and Industrial Research Organisation (CSIRO) as an artist to interpret and communicate the results of scientific research. From 1968 Ingpen worked as a freelance designer, illustrator and author. He was also a member of a United Nations team in Mexico and Peru until 1975, where he designed pamphlets on fisheries and was involved in "a number of Australian conservation and environmental projects". He left the CSIRO to work full-time as a freelance writer in 1968. Ingpen's interest in conservation issues continued, and he was one of the founding members of the Australian Conservation Foundation.

=== Work ===
Flag of the Northern Territory as designed by Ingpen

Ingpen has written or illustrated more than 100 published books. These include children's picture books and fictional stories for all ages. His nonfiction books mostly relate to history, conservation, environment and health issues. His most frequent collaborator has been the author and editor Michael Page.

Ingpen has designed many postage stamps for Australia, as well as the flag and coat of arms for the Northern Territory. Ingpen has created a number of public murals in Geelong, Melbourne, Canberra and the Gold Coast in Queensland. He also has designed bronze statues, which include the Poppykettle Fountain in the Geelong Steam Packet Gardens (currently dry due to drought restrictions) and the bronze doors to the Melbourne Cricket Club. His most recent work is the design and working drawings for a tapestry, which was woven by The Victorian Tapestry Workshop, to celebrate the 150 years of the Melbourne Cricket Ground.

In 1982 Ingpen designed the Dromkeen Medal for the Governors of the Courtney Oldmeadow Children's Literature Foundation. The Dromkeen is awarded annually to Australians in recognition of contributions to children's literature, and Ingpen received it himself in 1989 for his own work in the field.

Ingpen was illustrator for the centenary editions of J.M. Barrie's Peter Pan and Wendy and Kenneth Grahame's The Wind in the Willows for which he bases characterisations on contemporary figures and personalities.

In 2007 Ingpen illustrated a picture book by Liz Lofthouse called Ziba Came on a Boat, which was nominated for many Australian awards including the Australian Children's Book Council Awards and the Western Australian Premier's Book Awards.

== Exhibitions ==
In 1999 Ingpen had a major retrospective exhibition in Taipei, which travelled to other regions of Taiwan for a two-month period. Also in 1999 an exhibition of the original artworks and book launch for Around the World in 80 Days was held in London.

In 2002 Ingpen had a solo exhibition in Bologna, Italy, and works from Shakespeare were exhibited in New York City.

In 2002 Ingpen's work featured in the inaugural exhibition at the Eric Carle Museum of Picture Book Art, Massachusetts, and he donated to the Museum the illustrations for Charise Neugebauer's Halloween Circus at the Graveyard Lawn (2003).

== Awards ==
The biennial Hans Christian Andersen Award conferred by the International Board on Books for Young People is the highest recognition available to a writer or illustrator of children's books. Ingpen won the illustration award in 1986. Patricia Wrightson won the writing award that year, and they remain the only Australians among more than 60 Andersen Medal recipients. Ingpen had illustrated Wrightson's most highly regarded work, The Nargun and the Stars (1973), a children's fantasy rooted in Australian Aboriginal mythology.

He received the Australian Dromkeen Medal in 1989. In 2005 he was made honorary doctor of arts by the Royal Melbourne Institute of Technology and in 2007 made a member of the Order of Australia for "service to literature as an illustrator and author of children's books, to art design and education, and as a supporter of health care organisations."

Awards for particular works:

- Visual Arts Board award for children's book illustration for Storm Boy
- 1980 River Murray Mary was commended in the Children's Book of the Year awards
- 1980 Ditmar Australian Fiction Award for Australian Gnomes (Poppykettle, book one)

== Works ==
=== As illustrator only ===
- Storm Boy (1974) by Colin Thiele
- The Runaway Punt (1976) by Michael F. Page
- The Australian Countrywoman's Cookbook (1977)
- Running the Brumbies: True Adventures of a Modern Bushman (1979) by Colin Stone
- Lincoln's Place (1978) by Colin Thiele
- Chadwick's Chimney (1979) by Colin Thiele
- River Murray Mary (1979) by Colin Thiele
- I Rhyme My Time: a Selection of Poems for Young People (1980) by David Martin
- Turning Points in the Making of Australia (1980) by Michael Page
- Night of the Muttonbirds (1981) by Mary Small
- This Peculiar Colony (1981) by Ronald Rose
- Clancy of the Overflow (1982) by Banjo Paterson
- Churchill Island (1982) text by Graham Pizzey
- Click Go the Shears (1986)
- The Stolen White Elephant (1987) by Mark Twain [1882]
- A Strange Expedition (1988) by Mark Twain [?]
- Child's Story (1988) by Charles Dickens [1852]
- A Christmas Tree (1988) by Charles Dickens [1850]
- The Nargun and the Stars (1988) by Patricia Wrightson
- Peacetimes (1989) by Katherine Scholes
- The Great Deeds of Superheroes (1989) by Maurice Saxby
- The Great Deeds of Heroic Women (1990) by Maurice Saxby
- The Lands of the Bible (1992) by Philip Wilkinson and Jacqueline Dineen
- The Magical East (1992) by Wilkinson and Michael Pollard
- The Master Builders (1992) by Wilkinson and Pollard
- The Mediterranean (1992) by Wilkinson and Dineen
- Brahminy: the Story of a Boy and a Sea Eagle (c1995) by Colin Thiele
- The Drover's Boy (1997) by Ted Egan
- Jacob, the Boy from Nuremberg (1998) by Enjar Agertoft
- The Poppykettle Papers (London: Pavilion, 1999) by Michael Lawrence – part of the Poppykettle series
- Who is the World For? (2000) by Tom Pow
- Shakespeare: His Work and His World (Walker, 2001) by Michael Rosen; OCLC 861921127
- Halloween Circus (NY: North–South, 2002) by Charise Neugebauer – a Michael Neugebauer Book OCLC 223257923
- The Tapestry Story: Celebrating 150 Years of the Melbourne Cricket Ground (2003) by Keith Dunstan
- The Wizard's Book of Spells (2003) by Beatrice Phillpotts
- The Magic Crystal (ca. 2003) by Brigitte Weninger
- Dickens: His Work and His World (Walker, 2005) by Michael Rosen; OCLC 60741089
- Mustara (2007) by Rosanne Hawke
- Ziba Came on a Boat (2008) by Liz Lofthouse

Children's Classics

- Around the World in Eighty Days (2000) by Jules Verne [1873 in French]
- Peter Pan and Wendy (‡ 2004) by J. M. Barrie [1911], centenary edition
- Treasure Island (‡ 2005) by Robert Louis Stevenson [1883]
- The Ugly Duckling (Walker, 2005) by Hans Christian Andersen [1843 in Danish]
- The Jungle Book (‡ 2006) by Rudyard Kipling [1894]
- The Wind in the Willows (‡ 2007?) by Kenneth Grahame [1908], centenary edition
- A Christmas Carol and "A Christmas Tree" (‡ 2008) by Charles Dickens [1843 and 1850]
- Alice's Adventures in Wonderland (‡ 2009) by Lewis Carroll [1865]
- The Adventures of Tom Sawyer (‡ 2010) by Mark Twain [1876] – "for the centenary of Twain's death in April 1910"
- The Night Before Christmas (‡ 2010) by Clement C. Moore ["A Visit from St. Nicholas", 1823]
- The Secret Garden (‡ 2010) by Frances Hodgson Burnett [1911] – centenary edition
- Around the World in Eighty Days (‡ 2011) by Jules Verne [1873 in French]
- The Wonderful Wizard of Oz (‡ 2011) by L. Frank Baum [1900]
- The Owl and the Pussycat and Other Nonsense (‡ 2012) by Edward Lear (1812–1888) – Lear bicentenary edition
- Just So Stories (2013) by Rudyard Kipling [1902]
- The Adventures of Pinocchio (2014) by Carlo Collodi [1883 in Italian]
- The Wind in the Willows (2023) by Kenneth Grahame [1908], adapted by Karen Saunders - Picture Book Classics

‡ 12 works named by Palazzo Editions in two pages on Ingpen. The Night Before Christmas and The Owl and the Pussycat differ in format, larger and much shorter than the "Palazzo Children's Classics" series (192 to 240pp, 235 x 195mm).

=== Fiction writing ===
- Poppykettle series
  - Australian Gnomes (Adelaide: Rigby Opal Books, 1979)
  - The Voyage of the Poppykettle (Rigby, 1980)
  - The Unchosen Land (1981)
- Beginnings and Endings with Lifetimes in Between (1983) by Ingpen and Bryan Mellonie; North American title, evidently Lifetimes: a Beautiful Way to Explain Death to Children, OCLC 17509505
- The Great Bullocky Race (1984) by Ingpen and Michael Fitzgerald Page
- The Idle Bear (1986)
- Out of This World: the Complete Book of Fantasy (1986) by Ingpen and Michael Fitzgerald Page
- The Age of Acorns (1988)
- The Dreamkeeper: a Letter from Robert Ingpen to His Granddaughter Alice Elizabeth (1995)
- The Afternoon Treehouse (1996)
- Folk Tales & Fables of Asia & Australia (1992) by Ingpen and Barbara Hayes
- Once Upon a Place (1999)
- A Bear Tale (2000)
- The Rare Bear (2004)

=== Non-fiction writing ===
- In Pastures Green: the Story of the Presbyterian Church, Sale, Gippsland, Victoria (c1954)
- Pioneers of Wool (1972)
- Pioneer Settlement in Australia (1973)
- Robe: a Portrait of the Past (1975)
- Don Dunstan's Cookbook (1976)
- Paradise and Beyond: Tasmania (1978) by Ingpen and N.C.K. Evers
- Australian Gnomes (1979)
- Marking Time: Australia's Abandoned Buildings (1979)
- Australia's Heritage Watch: an Overview of Australian Conservation (1981)
- Aussie Battlers (1982) by Ingpen and Michael Fitzgerald Page
- Australian Inventions and Innovations (1982) by Ingpen, Sally Carruthers, and others
- Colonial South Australia: Its People and Buildings (1985) by Michael Fitzgerald Page
- Worldly Dogs (1986) by Ingpen and Michael Fitzgerald Page
- The Making of Australians (1987) by Ingpen and Michael Fitzgerald Page
- Conservation (1987) by Ingpen and Margaret Dunkle
- Encyclopedia of Things That Never Were: Creatures, Places, and People (1987) by Ingpen and Michael Fitzgerald Page
- A Celebration of Customs & Rituals of the World (1994) by Ingpen and Philip Wilkinson
- Encyclopedia of Mysterious Places: the Life and Legends of Ancient Sites Around the World (1990) by Ingpen and Wilkinson
- In the Wake of the Mary Celeste (c. 2004) by Ingpen and Gary Crew
- Imprints of Generations (2006)
- The Boy from Bowral: the Story of Sir Donald Bradman (2007)
- Looking for Clancy (National Library of Australia, 2013), featuring "Clancy of the Overflow" by A.B. Paterson [1889]
