= Michael Lawrence (writer) =

English children's writer

- Born: 14 September 1943 (age 82); Huntingdonshire, England
- Occupation: Writer
- Writing career
- Period: 1994–present
- Genres: Children's and young adult fiction
- Website: mclaw.gallery

Michael C. Lawrence (born 14 September 1943) is an English writer for children and young adults. His work most widely held in WorldCat libraries is the 2003 novel A Crack in the Line, first in a trilogy called The Aldous Lexicon, or Withern Rise in the United States. Much of the Jiggy McCue series of sixteen books is widely held in participating libraries. His only known website active in 2022 is that of the graphics artist McLaw.

== Early life ==
Michael Lawrence was born in Huntingdonshire. His family moved to Sudbury in Middlesex when he was four. He attended Ealing School of Art and the London School of Printing before working in London as a graphic designer and photographer.

== Career ==
Lawrence became an art and antiques dealer, but when he sold a novel (When the Snow Falls, published in 1995), he decided to concentrate on writing for young people. When the Snow Falls was later rewritten and recast for older readers as A Crack in the Line, the first novel in The Withern Rise Trilogy. He also co-authored The Poppykettle Papers with Robert Ingpen, and his book Young Dracula and Young Monsters was the basis for the CBBC television series Young Dracula.

== Bibliography ==
=== Jiggy McCue ===
- The Poltergoose (1999), republished as The Curse of the Poltergoose (2009)
- The Killer Underpants (2000)
- The Toilet of Doom (2001)
- Maggot Pie (2002), republished as The Meanest Genie (2009)
- The Snottle (2003)
- Nudie Dudie (2004)
- Neville the Devil (2005)
- Ryan's Brain (2006)
- The Iron, the Switch and the Broom Cupboard (2007)
- Kid Swap (2008)
- One for All and All for Lunch (2009)
- Rudie Dudie (2010)
- Evilution: The Troof (2011) World Book Day 2011
- Murder & Chips (2012)

=== Jiggy's Genes ===
- Jiggy's Magic Balls (2010)
- Jiggy the Vampire Slayer (2011)
- Jiggy and the Witchfinder (Released Sept 2011)

=== Withern Rise/Aldous Lexicon ===
- A Crack in the Line ISBN 978-1-84362-416-5 (2003)
- Small Eternities ISBN 1-84121-168-0 (2004)
- The Underwood See ISBN 1-84362-875-9 (2006)

=== Other ===
- When the Snow Falls (1995)
- The Griffin and Oliver Pie ISBN 978-1-84362-356-4 (2006)
- Milking the Novelty, a personal memoir ISBN 0-9549381-0-0 (2005)
- Young Dracula and Young Monsters ISBN 978-1-78112-355-3 (2006)
- Juby's Rook ISBN 1-84616-621-7 (2007)
- Hero 41: Eye of the Gargoyle (Sam Penant, pseudonym) (2014)
- Hero 41: The People in the Wall (Sam Penant, pseudonym) (2015)
- This Ruined Place ISBN 9798987977439 (2023) (a reissue of Juby's Rook)
- The Rainey Seasons (2024)
- The Silence of Bleakridge (2024)
