= Conquest of Brahmanabad =

- Part of Umayyad conquest of Sindh
Date	April – September 713
Location	Modern-day Mansura, Sindh 25.881111°N 68.776944°E
Result	Umayyad victory

Belligerents
Umayyad Caliphate	Kingdom of Sindh

Commanders and leaders
Muhammad ibn al-Qasim; Bananah ibn Khantalah Kilabi	Jai Singh

Strength
Unknown	40,000 (exaggeration)

Casualties and losses
Unknown	6,000–8,000 killed
- Location within Sindh Conquest of Brahmanabad (Pakistan)

The Conquest of Brahmanabad was a military siege imposed by the Umayyad forces against the Sindh forces in the Brahmanabad fortress. After a six-month siege, the Umayyads successfully conquered the fortress.

== Background ==
The Umayyad general, Muhammad ibn al-Qasim, conquered the city of Debal. The city belonged to Raja Dahir, the ruler of the Brahmin dynasty of Sindh. The Umayyads proceed to conquer the cities of Neurn and Sehwan without much difficulty. The Umayyads then marched to Rawar Fort. There he met Raja Dahir's army, and a battle ensued, which ended in the defeat of the Sindh forces and the death of Raja Dahir. The Umayyads then marched to the Aror fortress and besieged it, defended by Raja Dahir's widow. After a heroic defense, the fortress fell, and the widow committed Jauhar.

== Conquest ==
After that, the Umayyads proceeded to Brahmanabad. It was defended by Jai Singh, the son of Raja Dahir. Muhammad gave the garrison three options: convert to Islam, submit and pay the Jizya, or face battle. The fortress is said to have a garrison of 40,000 men, which is indeed an exaggeration. Muhammad ordered a trench to be dug. The garrison sailed out daily to attack the Muslims, and the space between the trenches and fort walls became a battlefield. Muslim artillery could not get close to the walls for bombardment. Muhammad began to worry as his supplies started to run out.

Jai Singh was not in Brahmanabad, but he provided support for the garrison and intercepted the Muslim supply lines. To solve this, Muhammad dispatched Bananah ibn Khantalah Kilabi to intercept Jai Singh. When he learned of the Muslim army's approach, he retreated with his family. Free from constant Sindh attacks, Muhammad's focus lay on the fortress. The Sindh garrison situation became dire, and after a six-month siege, the fortress fell. All military men were killed, numbering 6,000-8,000 men; however, artisans, traders, and commoners were spared. Muhammad also captured another widow of Raja Dahir, Rani Landi, and her two daughters: Surya Devi and Parmal Devi.

== Aftermath ==
Muhammad left the affairs of Brahmanabad to its inhabitants and garrisoned it with Muslim troops. Muhammad continued his conquest and managed to capture the capital of the Sindh kingdom, Aror, thus completing the Islamic conquest of Sindh.

== Sources ==
- Rohit Manglik (2023), History of India from the Earliest Time.
- Gobind Khushalani (2006), Chachnamah Retold : An Account Of The Arab Conquest Of Sindh.
- Gurcharn Singh Sandhu (2000), A Military History of Ancient India.
