= Surya Devi =

Indian princess

Surya Devi (died 715) was a Sindhi Hindu princess. She is known for having been taken captive by the Umayyad army commander Muhammad bin Qasim during the Islamic invasion of Sindh and given, along with her sister, to Caliph Sulayman ibn Abd al-Malik. According to the traditional story, she persuaded the Caliph to execute Muhammad bin Qasim, avenging her parents, and then managed to escape the captivity by having the Caliph execute her and her sister.

== Life ==
She was the eldest daughter of Dahir of Aror, the Maharaja of Sindh.

In 711 CE the kingdom was invaded by the Umayyad Caliphate led by Muhammad bin Qasim. Her father was killed at the Battle of Aror which took place between his dynasty and the Arabs at the banks of the Indus River, near modern-day Nawabshah at the hands of the Arab general Muhammad bin Qasim.

One of the king's widows, Queen Rani Bai, resisted the invading forces at the fortress of Rawar. When she realised she was unable to win, she committed suicide by the jauhar. When the city of Brahmanabad fell, the dead king's second Queen, Rani Ladi, was captured with Dahir's two daughters, the princesses Surya Devi and Parimal Devi. The victorious Muhammad took the dowager queen Rani Ladi for himself, while the two princesses, being unmarried young virgins, were reserved for the Caliph's personal use, and sent on as presents to the Caliph Sulayman ibn Abd al-Malik for his harem in the capital of Damascus.

The Chach Nama narrates a version in which Surya Devi played a role in the death of Muhammad bin Qasim. The account relates that when the Caliph wished to rape Surya Devi, she told him that she was no longer a virgin, since Muhammad bin Qasim had raped her and her sister before sending them on. Enraged, the Caliph ordered that Muhammad be wrapped and stitched in oxen hides, and sent to Syria, which resulted in his death en route from suffocation. This narrative attributes their motive for this subterfuge to securing vengeance for their father's death. When the Caliph showed the corpse of Muhammad bin Qasim to Surya Devi to illustrate the fate of anyone dishonouring or disobeying the Caliph, she reportedly answered that she had lied about Muhammad Bin Qasim raping her, since she did not wish for her or her sister to become a slave in the Umayyad harem of the Caliph, and wished to have vengeance on her father's murderer.

Upon discovering this subterfuge, the Caliph is recorded to have been filled with remorse and ordered the sisters buried alive in a wall.
