= Arab conquest of Sindh =

Umayyad Caliphate's conquest of Sindh, Punjab and Makran

- Part of Umayyad campaigns in India and Muslim conquests in the Indian subcontinent
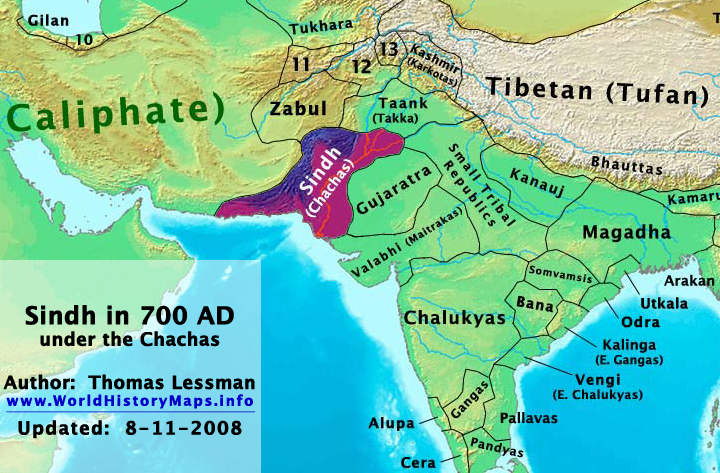
- The country of Sindh in 700 AD
Date	711–713 AD
Location	Sindh, Punjab and Makran (present-day Pakistan)
Result	Umayyad victory
Territorial changes	Incorporation and annexation of Chach-ruled Sindh as a caliphal province

Belligerents
Umayyad Caliphate; Supported by: Jats	Chach dynasty Kiraj or Kurij kingdom Jats

Commanders and leaders
Muhammad ibn al-Qasim; Ubaidullah †; Budail †; Mokah Basayah	Raja Dahir †; Jaisimha †

Casualties and losses
	c. 22,000–42,000 killed
- For detailed strength see Siege of Debal and Battle of Aror

Between 711 and 713, the Umayyad Caliphate defeated the Chach dynasty, the last Hindu dynasty to rule over Sindh, and incorporated Sindh (including a portion of southern Punjab and Makran) as a province of the empire, making the lower Indus Valley first region in South Asia to become part of Islamic world.

== Early conflicts ==
=== Early Muslim presence ===
The connection between Hindu-Buddhist Sindh and the Islamic caliphate was established by initial Muslim expeditions during the Rashidun Caliphate. Hukaym ibn Jabala al-Abdi attacked Makran in 649, followed by later operations under Al-Harith ibn Murra al-Abdi and Sayfi ibn Fasayl al-Shaybani in 658. During this period, many Jats of Sindh and Makran, known in Arabic sources as al-Zuṭṭ, came into contact with Islam; a contingent of Jats under their chief Danūr ibn ʿAlī even participated in the Battle of Camel fighting for Ali. Under the Umayyads, the region of Sindh frequently served as a refuge for Shi'as seeking asylum from Umayyad authority. The only solid gain at that time was the conquest of Makran.

== Background ==
=== Preceding campaigns ===
Although there was no direct connection between Arabia and Sindh, the war began due to pirates known as Bawarij who plagued the Arabian Sea. The Umayyad caliph al-Walid I offered Raja Dahir protection and sovereignty if he would help him in quelling the piracy. But Raja Dahir refused to return Arab rebels from Sindh, Meds and others. Med pirates disrupted shipping from their bases at Kutch, Debal and Kathiawar. Hostilities resumed between Sindh and Umayyads in 708 AD, when one of the pirate raids had kidnapped Muslim women traveling from Sri Lanka to Arabia near the port of Debal, thus providing a casus belli against the Sindhi King Dahir. The Umayyad governor of Iraq, al-Hajjaj ibn Yusuf wrote to Raja Dahir to set the women free. But Dahir expressed his inability to help retrieve the hostages. This gave al-Hajjaj the justification he needed to send a military expedition to Sindh.

=== Local population dynamics ===
The majority of the population of Sindh at the time of the Umayyad conquests was Hindu, but a significant minority adhered to Buddhism, and tensions between this minority and the Brahmin Chach dynasty led to sympathy and at times support from Buddhist populations towards the Arab invaders.

Burjor Avari writes that it is likely that Buddhists collaborated and sided with the Arabs before the invasion even began, something that the primary sources describe as well. The Soviet historian Yu Gankovsky wrote that the Arab invasions were made easier by the opposition of Buddhist community leaders towards the Hindu leaders of Sindh, resulting in them sympathizing with the Arab invaders and even helping them at times.

On the other hand, the Brahmin-led Hindu resistance against the Arabs continued on for much longer, in upper Sindh and Multan. The eastern Jats supported the Chach dynasty king, Raja Dahir, against the Arab invaders, whereas the western Jats aligned with Muhammad ibn al-Qasim against Dahir. Having settled the question of the freedom of religion and the social status of the Brahmins, Muhammad ibn al-Qasim turned against the Jats and Lohanas. Chronicles such as the Chachnama, Zainul-Akhbar and Tarikh-i Bayhaqi have recorded battles between Jats and forces of Muhammad ibn al-Qasim.

== Invasion ==
=== Raids on Debal ===
Hajjaj first dispatched ‘Ubaidullah to raid across Debal but he was defeated and killed. Next an army was sent under Budail by way of the Gulf of Oman. Budail received reinforcements and marched towards Debal where he was checked by Jaisimha, son of Dahir. A pitched battle ensued, lasting a whole day. At the end, the Muslim army was routed and Budail was killed.

=== Muhammad ibn al-Qasim's expedition ===
==== Prelude ====
Finally al-Hajjaj appointed his seventeen year old nephew Muhammad ibn al-Qasim to conquer Sindh with the approval of the Caliph al-Walid I (r. 705–715). Al-Hajjaj equipped an army built around 6,000 Syrian cavalry and detachments of mawali from Iraq, six thousand camelry, and a baggage train of 3,000 Bactrian camels under his nephew Muhammad ibn al-Qasim to Sindh. More reinforcements arrived from the governor of Makran with five catapults (manj'neeqs) were sent to Debal by sea.

==== Siege of Debal ====
Muhammad ibn al-Qasim laid siege and successfully conquered Debal leaving 4,000 Muslims behind and built a mosque in the city. The captive Muslim women were also released, and many prisoners were made while one-fifth of booty and slaves were sent to al-Hajjaj. The chief of the Hindus of Debal converted to Islam and appointed as advisor of revenue officials. Next Muhammad ibn al-Qasim proceeded to Nerun (Hyderabad) and Siwistan (Sehwan) where the local Buddhist priets aligned with Muhammad ibn al-Qasim against the local governors who were routed and defeated. They also aided Umayyads with provisions and entered into friendly relation. Mosques were built replacing idol-houses here too.

==== Battle of Aror ====
Muhammad ibn al-Qasim proceeded on the western bank of Indus River where some of the chiefs offered alliance. Mokah Basayah 'the king of Island of Bet' deserted Dahir and promised to supply Muhammad with boats for crossing the Indus on receiving as reward a large stretch of the conquered territory. The Thakurs of Bhatta and the ‘western Jats’ all paid homage (bay'ah) to the Arabs, joined them, and were posted on the island. Muhammad ibn al-Qasim was re-inforced by 2000 select horse sent by al-Hajjaj and 4000 warlike Jats from Siwistan. After two months of camping the Umayyads crossed the eastern bank of Indus and was joined by the brother of Mokah who helped him to cross the lake between the two armies. Dahir, supported by the chiefs of Sindh and 'eastern Jats' met the Umayyads at near Aror. Dahir who was boarding his elephant was struck by an arrow and killed. His son Jaisimha retreated to Brahmanabad in Sind leaving the queen behind at the fort of Aror. Muhammad promptly laid siege on the fort. The queen committed Jauhar along with the other females at the fort. Muhammad ibn al-Qasim next marched to Brahmanabad. Dahir’s head and the heads of ‘the chiefs of Hind’ were sent to al-Hajjaj, with the fifth of the booty and 'thirty thousand' slaves, including ‘those who were daughters of princes’, including Hasna, a niece of Dahir, who was given in marriage to Abdullah ibn Abbas, a nephew of the caliph. Dahir's son Fufi and grandson Chach, son of another of his sons Dharsiya, managed to flee the capital. Al-Hajjaj delivered a sermon in the Great Mosque of Kufa declaring the conquest of Sindh.

==== Conquest of Brahmanabad, Alor and Multan ====
Jaisimha fortified Brahmanabad as well as the capital city Alor. He led an army to disrupt Muhammad's supply lines. Jaisimha's chiefs minister joined Muhammad. After six-months' defense, Brahmanabad fell after some citizens entered a secret pact with the invading army. Muhammad then subdued other regions before capturing Alor after brief resistance. He then besieged Multan, which resisted for two months but surrendered due to treachery.

==== Casualties ====
Where resistance was strong, prolonged, and intensive, often resulting in considerable Arab casualties, Muhammad ibn al-Qasim's response was dramatic, inflicting 6,000 deaths at Aror (Rohri), between 6,000 and 26,000 at Brahmanabad, 4,000 at Iskalandah (Uch), and 6,000 at Multan. Conversely, in areas taken by sulh, such as Armabil, Nirun, and Aror, resistance was light and few casualties occurred. Sulh appeared to be Muhammad ibn al-Qasim's preferred mode of conquest, the method used for more than 60% of the towns and tribes recorded by al-Baladhuri and the Chachnama. At one point, he was actually berated by al-Hajjaj for being too lenient. Meanwhile, the common folk were often pardoned and encouraged to continue working; Al-Hajjaj ordered that this option not be granted to any inhabitant of Debal, yet Muhammad ibn al-Qasim still bestowed it upon certain groups and individuals.

== Reasons for success ==
Muhammad ibn al-Qasim's success has been partly ascribed to Dahir being an unpopular Hindu king ruling over a Buddhist majority who saw Chach of Alor and his kin as usurpers of the Rai dynasty. This is attributed to having resulted in support being provided by Buddhists and inclusion of rebel soldiers serving as valuable infantry in his cavalry-heavy force from the Jats and Meds. Brahman, Buddhist, Greek, and Arab testimony however can be found that attests towards amicable relations between the adherents of the two religions up to the 7th century.

Along with this were:

1. Superior military equipment; such as siege engines and the Mongol bow.
2. Troop discipline and leadership.
3. The concept of Jihad as a morale booster.
4. Religion, i.e. the widespread belief in the prophecy of Muslim success.
5. The Samanis being persuaded to submit and not take up arms because the majority of the population was Buddhist who were dissatisfied with their rulers, who were Hindu.
6. The labouring under disabilities of the Lohana Jats.
7. Defections from among Dahir's chiefs and nobles.

== Aftermath ==
The motive of the expedition was not to propagate Islam but to free the Muslim women captured off Debal.

After conquering Brahmanabad, Muhammad co-opted the local Brahman elite, whom he held in esteem, re-appointing them to posts held under the Brahman dynasty and offering honours and awards to their religious leaders and scholars. This arrangement with local Brahman elites resulted in the continued persecution of Buddhists, with Ibn al-Qasim confirming the existing Brahman regulation forbidding them from wearing anything but coarse clothing and requiring them to always walk barefoot accompanied by dogs.

Following his success in Sindh, Muhammad ibn al-Qasim wrote to "the kings of al-Hind (India)", calling upon them to surrender and accept the faith of Islam. He dispatched a force against al-Baylaman (Bhinmal), which is said to have offered submission. The Med people of Surast (Maitraka dynasty of Vallabhi) also made peace. Ibn al-Qasim then sent a cavalry of 10,000 to Kannauj, along with a decree from the Caliph. He went with an army to the prevailing frontier of Kashmir called Panj-Māhīyāt (in western Punjab). Nothing is known of the Kanauj expedition. The frontier of Kashmir might be what is referred to as al-Kiraj in later records (Kira Kingdom in present-day Kangra Valley, Himachal Pradesh), which was subdued.

Ibn al-Qasim was recalled in 715 CE and died en route. Al-Baladhuri writes that, upon his departure, the kings of al-Hind had come back to their kingdoms. The period of caliph Umar II (r. 717–720) was relatively peaceful. Umar invited the kings of "al-Hind" to convert to Islam and become his subjects, in return for which they would continue to remain kings. Hullishah of Sindh and other kings accepted the offer and adopted Arab names.

The Umayyad conquest brought the region into the cosmopolitan network of Islam. Many Sindhi Muslims played an important part during the Islamic Golden Age, including Abu Ma'shar al-Sindi and Abu Raja al-Sindi. Famous jurists Abd al-Rahman al-Awza'i and Makhul al-Shāmī were also reported to be originally from al-Sind, as were literary figures Ibn al-A'rabi and Kushajim.

== See also ==
- History of Sindh
- List of monarchs of Sindh

== Sources ==
- al-Balādhurī (1924). The Origins of the Islamic State. Vol. Part II. Translated by Murgotten, Francis Clark. New York: Columbia University. OCLC 6396175.
- Al-Baladhuri (1924). The Origins of the Islamic State. Vol. Part II. Translated by Murgotten, Francis Clark. New York: Columbia University. OCLC 6396175.
- Blankinship, Khalid Yahya (1994). The End of the Jihad State: The Reign of Hisham Ibn 'Abd al-Malik and the Collapse of the Umayyads. Albany, New York: SUNY Press. ISBN 978-0-7914-1827-7.
- El Hareir, Idris; M'Baye, Ravene, eds. (2011). The Spread of Islam Throughout the World (PDF). The Different Aspects of Islamic Culture. Vol. Three. UNESCO Publishing. ISBN 978-92-3-104153-2.
- Tripathi, Rama Shankar (1989), History of Kanauj: To the Moslem Conquest, Motilal Banarsidass, ISBN 978-81-208-0404-3
- Wink, André (2002a) [1996]. Al-Hind, Volume 1 The Making of the Indo-Islamic World: Early Medieval India and the Expansion of Islam 7th-11th Centuries. Vol. I (3rd ed.). BRILL. ISBN 978-0-391-04173-8.
- Wink, André (2002b) [1996], Al-Hind The Making of the Indo-Islamic World Slave Kings and the Islamic Conquest, 11th-13th Centuries, vol. II (Third ed.), Brill, ISBN 978-0391041738
- Majumdar, R. C., ed. (1962) [1954]. The History and Culture of the Indian People - 3 The Classical Age (Second ed.). Bombay: Bharatiya Vidya Bhavan.
- MacLean, Derryl N. (1989), Religion and Society in Arab Sind, BRILL, ISBN 90-04-08551-3
- Friedmann, Y. (1993). "Muḥammad b. al-Ḳāsim". In Bosworth, C. E.; van Donzel, E.; Heinrichs, W. P. & Pellat, Ch. (eds.). The Encyclopaedia of Islam, Second Edition. Volume VII: Mif–Naz. Leiden: E. J. Brill. pp. 405–406. ISBN 978-90-04-09419-2.
