= Dahir of Aror =

Maharaja of Sindh from 695 to 712

- Maharaja

Maharaja of Sindh
- Reign: 695 – 20 June 712
- Predecessor: Chandar
- Successor: Kingdom abolished (annexed by the Umayyad Caliphate)
- Regent: Dahir
- Born: 663; Aror
- Died: 20 June 712 (aged 48–49); Indus River
- Spouses: Ladee; Rani Bai
- Issue: Surya Devi; Premala Devi; Jodha Devi; Jaisiah; Dharsiya; Fufi
Names
- Raja Dahir Sen
- Dynasty: Chach dynasty
- Father: Chach of Aror
- Mother: Rani Suhanadi (former wife of Rai Sahasi)
- Religion: Hinduism

Raja Dahir (663 – 20 June 712) was the last maharaja of Sindh during 695–712 CE. A Brahmin ruler, his kingdom was invaded in 711 by the Arab Umayyad Caliphate, led by Muhammad ibn al-Qasim, fighting against which Dahir was killed. According to the Chachnama, the Umayyad campaign against Dahir was launched due to a pirate raid off the Sindh coast by the Bawarij that resulted in gifts to the Umayyad caliph from the king of Serendib being stolen.

Dahir was born in 663 into the Chach dynasty, which was deeply rooted in the Hindu traditions and governance. His father, Chach of Aror, who ruled from 631 to 671, was a Brahmin who ascended to the throne after marrying the widowed Queen Suhandi. This event established the Chach dynasty, which would rule Sindh for nearly a century.

He won two battles, but was killed in the final battle of Aror. His death took place at the banks of the Indus River near modern-day Rohri at the hands of Muhammad ibn al-Qasim.

== Sources ==
The Chachnama is the oldest chronicle of the Arab conquest of Sindh. It was translated into Persian by an Arab named Muhammad Ali bin Hamid bin Abu Bakr Kufi in 1216 from an earlier Arabic text believed to have been written by a member of the Thaqafi family (relatives of Mukhtar al-Thaqafi).

== Umayyad conquest of Sindh ==
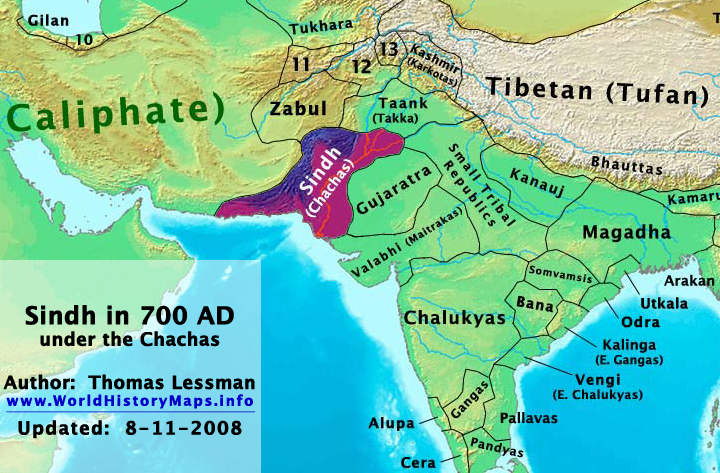
Sindh in 700 CE, under the Chach dynasty, with the Umayyad Caliphate on the west.

Throughout his reign, maharaja Dahir had to face invasions from the Umayyad Caliphate based in Damascus. The primary reason cited in the Chachnama for the expedition by the governor of Basra, al-Hajjaj ibn Yusuf against Dahir was a pirate raid off the coast of Debal resulting in gifts to the caliph from the king of Serendib (modern Sri Lanka) being stolen. The Bawarij had pirated upon Sassanid shipping in the past, from the mouth of the Tigris to the Sri Lankan coast, and now they were able to prey on Arab shipping from their bases at Kutch, Debal and Kathiawar.

According to Chachnama and the Arab historian al-Baladhuri, Dahir defeated the Umayyads twice in pitched battles during the twin battles of Debal in which the invading Arab commanders Ubaidullah and Budail or Bazil were killed by forces under Dahir's son Jaisiah. Jaisiah later appointed his own chief or thakur who governed on his behalf. According to Chachnama, when the news of Bazil's death was relayed to Hajjaj, he was saddened and enraged. This led to the fateful expedition by Muhammad ibn al-Qasim.

Hajjaj's next campaign was launched under the aegis of Muhammad ibn al-Qasim. In 711, Ibn al-Qasim attacked at Debal and, on orders of Al-Hajjaj, freed the earlier captives and prisoners from the previous campaigns. Other than this instance, the policy was generally one of enlisting and co-opting support from defectors and defeated lords and forces. From Debal, Ibn al-Qasim moved on to Nerun for supplies; its Buddhist governor had acknowledged himself as a tributary of the caliphate after the first campaign and capitulated to the second. Ibn al-Qasim's armies then captured Siwistan and received allegiance from several tribal chiefs and secured the surrounding regions. His combined forces captured the fort at Sisam and secured the region west of the Indus River.

By enlisting the support of local tribes such as the Meds and also the support of the Buddhist rulers of Nerun, Bajhra, Kaka Kolak and Siwistan as infantry for his predominantly-mounted army, Muhammad ibn al-Qasim gathered sufficient army for the final battle against Dahir.

According to Chachnama, sometime before the final battle, Dahir's vizier approached him and suggested that Dahir should take refuge with one of the friendly kings of India. "You should say to them, 'I am a wall between you and the Arab army. If I fall, nothing will stop your destruction at their hands.'" If that was not acceptable to Dahir, said the vizier, then he should at least send away his family to some safe point in India. Dahir refused to do either. "I cannot send away my family to security while the families of my thakurs and nobles remain here." Before the battle of Aror, maharaja Dahir is said to have given a speech as per Chachnama:

"I am going to meet the Arabs in open battle, and fight them as best as I can. If I crush them, my kingdom will then be put on a firm footing. But if I am killed honourably, the event will be recorded in the books of Arabia and India and will be talked about by great men. It will be heard by other kings in the world, and it will be said that Raja Dahir of Sindh sacrificed his precious life for the sake of his country, in fighting with the enemy."

Dahir then tried to prevent Ibn al-Qasim from crossing the Indus, moving his forces to its eastern banks. Eventually, however, Ibn al-Qasim crossed the river and defeated his forces led by Jaisiah (Dahir's son) at Aror (near modern Rohri) in 711, killing him. After Dahir was killed, his head was cut off and sent to Hajjaj bin Yousuf.

== See also ==
- Jayapala
- Rai dynasty

== Sources ==
- Mirza Kalichbeg Fredunbeg: The Chachnamah, An Ancient History of Sind, Giving the Hindu period down to the Arab Conquest. Translated by from the Persian by, Commissioners Press 1900
- R. C. Majumdar, H.C. Roychandra and Kalikinkar Ditta: An Advanced History of India, Part II,
- Tareekh-Sind, By Mavlana Syed Abu Zafar Nadvi
- Wink, Andre, Al-Hind the Making of the Indo Islamic World, Brill Academic Publishers, 1 January 1996, ISBN 90-04-09249-8
- Maurya, Sudheer, Sindhusuta - Historical Novel ISBN 978-8195444786
