= Yom-e Bab ul-Islam =

Yom-e Bab ul-Islam (Urdu: یوم باب الاسلام) is observed on 10th Ramadan to commemorate the establishment of Muslim rule by Muhammad bin Qasim in modern Pakistan in 711 AD. Muhammad bin Qasim Al-Thaqafi was an Umayyad general who, at the age of 17, began the conquest of the Sind (which now consist of whole of Pakistan) for the Umayyad Caliphate. He was born and raised in the city of Taif (in modern-day Saudi Arabia). Qasim's conquest of Sind laid the foundations of Islamic rule in the South Asia.

== See also ==
- Public holidays in Pakistan
- Muhammad bin Qasim
