= Jabir ibn Abd Allah =

Companion of Muhammad (died 697 CE/78 AH)

Jabir ibn Abd Allah جابر بن عبدالله

Title: al-Ansari الأنصاري
- Birthplace: Medina, Hejaz
- Ethnicity: Arab
- Known For: Being a companion of Muhammad, Ali, and the Ahl al-Bayt
- Influences: Muhammad, Ali, and the Ahl al-Bayt
- Born: 16 BH / 607 AD
- Died: 74 AH / 697 AD
- Burial Place: Medina, Saudi Arabia
- Parents: Abd Allah ibn Amr ibn Haram (father); Nasiba bint Uqba ibn Uddi (mother)
- Religion: Islam

Jābir ibn ʿAbd Allāh ibn ʿAmr ibn Ḥarām al-Anṣārī (Arabic: جابر بن عبدالله بن عمرو بن حرام الأنصاري, died 697 CE/78 AH), Abu Muhammad and Abu Abd al-Rahman also wrote his nickname, was a prominent companion of the Islamic prophet Muhammad and narrator of Hadith. Imami sources say Jabir was one of Ali's special and chosen companions and one of Hassan, Hussein, Zain al-Abidin and Muhammad Baqir's companions. Jabir narrated hadiths from Abu Bakr, Umar, Ammar ibn Yasir and Muadh ibn Jabal, and he narrated hadiths from young companions including Saʽid al-Khudri and Abu Hurayra. Jabir bin Abdullah also had a scientific reputation among the companions. According to Hisham ibn Urwah, he had a circle for teaching in the Prophet's Mosque, which brought followers around him in connection with the Quran.

Based on the count provided by Nawi, in Sunni hadith sources, 1,540 hadiths of Muhammad have been recorded through Jabir, of which 26 are specific to Sahih al-Bukhari.

Jabir was known as an authority on Islamic jurisprudence in Medina during his time, and especially after the death of Abd Allah ibn Umar (73 AH), he was an unrivaled authority in Medina. At the end of his life, Jabir, as an elderly companion, became an important authority for Muhammad's biography and the early history of Islam.

== Life ==
=== Early life ===
Jabir ibn ʿAbd Allah al-Ansari was born in Yathrib (now known as Medina) 15 years before the Hijra. He belonged to a poor family of Medina. He was from the tribe of Khazraj. Jabir's father converted to Islam before Muhammad's migration to Yathrab and him in the second pledge of allegiance and became one of the twelve Naqibs whom Muhammad chose to represent their tribes. He was present in the Battle of Badr and was killed in the Battle of Uhud. His grandfather was Amroob bin Haram bin Ka'b bin Gham and was related to Khazraj. His mother was Nasiba bint Uqba ibn Uddi. Jabir was from the Bani Salma tribe of Banu Khazraj and his "Salami" lineage was from this.

After the death of Muhammad, Jaber maintained his credibility, but unlike some of his companions, he was not interested in participating in the political and military activities of that time and was more stable in Medina. During his lifetime he was chosen by the Caliph as an "Arif" and representative of an Ansar tribe to which he belonged.

=== Muhammad's era ===
Jabir ibn Abd Allah al-Ansari is said to have accepted Islam when he was about 7. The first mention of Jabir's life is his presence with his father in the second pledge of allegiance in the 13th year of the Prophethood. He was the youngest observer of the pledge of allegiance of the Osasians and Khazrajians to Muhammad. He must have been around sixteen years old at that time. After the migration of the Holy Prophet from Mecca to Medina, Jabir was one of the young people who participated in most of the expeditions and raids. had and only in Ghazwa Badr and Uhud were absent. Also, he is recognised as the Sahaba with the most count of hadith relating to Hajj.

His participation in the Battle of Badr is questioned by some historians; he is known to have fought in 19 battles (including Badr) under command of Muhammad and was a trusted Sahabi. He was present during the conquest of Mecca.

==== Battle of Uhud ====
In the Battle of Uhud, Jabir ibn Abd Allah was not allowed by his father Abd Allah to take part in Jihad. Jabir had seven sisters (some historians say nine) and Abd Allah wanted him to take care of his family. So instead of fighting, Jabir served the thirsty soldiers. Jabir's father, Abd Allah ibn Amr ibn Haram al-Ansari was martyred in the Battle of Uhud along with his brother-in-law, Amr ibn al-Jamuh, both having reached nearly 100 years of age.In the 3rd Hijri year before the battle of Zaat al-Raqqa, Jaber married a widow named Sahima, the daughter of Masoud bin Aus, in order to take better care of his nine sisters after the death of his father. Jaber was facing financial problems at this time, his father was in debt. Some time later, on his way back from the Battle of Dhat al-Riqa (4th year of Hijri), Muhammad came to Jabir and politely solved his financial problem. According to some reports, the relationship between Muhammad and Jabir was sincere and friendly.

==== Miracle of the date pile ====
Jabir narrates, "When the season of plucking the dates came, I went to Allah's Messenger and said, "You know that my father was martyred on the day of Uhud, and he was heavily in debt, and I would like that the creditors should see you." The Prophet said, "Go and pile every kind of dates apart." I did so and called him (i.e. the Prophet). When the creditors saw him, they started claiming their debts from me then in such a harsh manner (as they had never done before). So when he saw their attitude, he went round the biggest heap of dates thrice, and then sat over it and said, 'O Jabir, call your companions (i.e. the creditors).' Then he kept on measuring (and giving) to the creditors (their due) till Allah paid all the debt of my father. I would have been satisfied to retain nothing of those dates for my sisters after Allah had paid the debts of my father. But Allah saved all the heaps (of dates), so that when I looked at the heap where the Prophet had been sitting, it seemed as if a single date had not been taken away thereof. ." After Mu'awiya I came to power, he decided to move the pulpit of the Messenger of God from Medina to Damascus (year 50). Jaber was one of those who went to Mu'awiyah and dissuaded him from doing so. A group of Egyptians have narrated from him. During these days, Maslama ibn Mukhallad, a fellow tribe member of Jaber, was the governor of Egypt, and according to Ibn Manda, Jabir went to Damascus and Egypt with Muslimah. Retribution from Abdullah ibn Unais, a trip to Syria, the date of which is unknown. During the time of Muawiyah, he also went to Syria, where he faced Muawiyah's indifference. Jaber, who was dissatisfied with Muawiya's behavior, took the road to Medina and did not accept Muawiya's donation of six hundred dinars. The children of Jaber Abdul Rahman, Muhammad, Mahmoud, Abdullah and Aqeel have been mentioned. About the existence of people attributed to Jaber in today's Africa, Tunisia; And there are reports in Bukhara Jaber's scientific personality. Jabir is one of those Companions who narrated many hadiths. Therefore, he was called the preserver of the prophetic tradition and the narrator of hadith.

Jabir was an authority in jurisprudence and issued fatwas, which placed him among the companions from whom moderate fatwas were narrated, and therefore Dhahabi called him a mujtahid and jurist. Jabir died during the Imamate of Imam Sajjad, and Imam Baqir was a child or teenager at the time of Jabir's death.

=== Ali ibn Abi Talib era ===
He was loyal to Ali. Jaber was a member of a group known as "Sharta Al-Khamis", who were devotees of Ali. He fought in all three major battles under the fourth Rashidun caliph Ali ibn Abi Talib: Battle of Jamal, Battle of Sifeen and Battle of Nahrawan.

According to Imami narrations, 40 days after the event of Ashura, he came to Karbala to visit Hussein bin Ali's shrine and this was considered the first Shia action to hold the Arbaeen ceremony of Hossein as Imam.

=== Ali ibn Husayn's (ibn Ali) era (Shia doctrine) ===
In the event of Karbala and the death of Hussain, Jaber bin Abdullah was one of the old men of Medina, and he was concerned about the descendants of the Messenger of God. Imam Hussain has introduced Jabir as one of the witnesses of his statement in protest against the army of Obaidullah bin Ziyad. The story of Jabir bin Abdullah's meeting with Imam Baqir is mentioned in the sources. Jabir had heard from the Prophet Muhammad that he will live long enough to see a child from my generation with the same name, he is a splitter of knowledge (Baqir), Jabir sent greetings to him on my behalf. He was looking for this child and calling out in the mosque of Madinah: "Ya Baqirul Uloom" finally one day he found Muhammad bin Ali and remembered the words of Muhammad, kissed the child and conveyed the greetings of the Prophet to him.

Jabir had a long life and became blind in his old age.

=== Abd al-Malik's era and Jabir’s death ===
It was during this era that he retold the Hadith of Umar's speech of forbidding Mut'ah. Jabir had a long life. According to Shia sources he was poisoned by Al-Hajjaj ibn Yusuf when he was 94 in, because of his loyalty to Ahl al-Bayt. He died in 78 AH (697) in Medina, Saudi Arabia.

== Legacy ==
He narrated about 1,547 Hadiths (some historians say). After the death of Muhammad he used to deliver lectures in Masjid Nabwi, Medina, Egypt, and Damascus. Such leading Tabi'en scholars as Amr ibn Dinar, Mujahid, Atiyya ibn Sa'd and Ata' ibn Abi Rabah attended his lectures. People gathered around him in Damascus and Egypt to learn about Muhammad and his Hadiths.Upon research it is said that he started and carried out the tradition of Arbaeen 1300 years ago.

== List of narrated hadith ==
- Hadith of Jesus Praying Behind Mahdi
- Hadiths related to Mut'ah and An-Nisa, 24
- Hadith of Ghadir Khumm
- Hadith al-Thaqalayn
- A narration regarding Contraception

== See also ==
- Ali ibn Abi Talib
- Hasan ibn Ali
- Husayn ibn Ali
- Ali ibn Husayn
- Muhammad ibn Ali
- Murtadha al-Ansari
