= Umayyad tradition of cursing Ali =

State policy of the Umayyad Caliphate

During the Umayyad Caliphate, the cursing of Ali ibn Abi Talib, the fourth Rashidun caliph (r. 656–661) and the first Shia Imam, who was also the cousin and son-in-law of the Islamic prophet Muhammad, was a state policy introduced by the first Umayyad caliph, Mu'awiya I (r. 661–680). As the long-time governor of the Levant, Mu'awiya had revolted against Ali's caliphate to avenge his kinsman, the third Rashidun caliph Uthman (r. 644–656), who was assassinated by rebels from the provinces angered by his policies. Ali and Mu'awiya fought the inconclusive Battle of Siffin in 657 CE and continued hostilities until the assassination of Ali in 661, which paved the way for Mu'awiya to take over the caliphate in the same year. The cursing of Ali was continued by Umayyad rulers after Mu'awiya and was finally abandoned sixty years later by the pious Umar ibn Abd al-Aziz (r. 717–720). The policy likely served as a propaganda measure and test of loyalty, helping to provoke, identify, and crush the supporters of Ali, who were opponents of Umayyad rule. The historicity of such a policy is supported by Shia Muslims, whereas it has remained disputed amongst Sunni Muslim scholars.

== Background ==
The controversial policies of the third Rashidun caliph Uthman ibn Affan resulted in a rebellion that led to his assassination in 656 CE by provincial dissidents. Ali ibn Abi Talib, the cousin and son-in-law of the Islamic prophet Muhammad, was subsequently elected as the next Rashidun caliph in Medina. There Ali received a nearly unanimous pledge of allegiance, gathering various underprivileged groups around himself, though his support stemmed in particular from the Ansar and the Iraqis. In contrast, Ali found limited support among the powerful Quraysh tribe, some of whom aspired to the caliphate.

Among the Qurayshite leaders, Ali's caliphate was soon challenged by Aisha, a widow of Muhammad, and two prominent companions of the Prophet, Talha and Zubayr. They accused Ali of complicity in Uthman's death and denounced his accession to the caliphate, while demanding retribution against Uthman's killers and attempted to rally support against Ali among the troops of Basra. This prompted Ali to leave for Iraq's other garrison town, Kufa, which he established as his capital and from where he could better confront his challengers. Ali defeated their rebellion at the Battle of the Camel, in which Talha and Zubayr were slain and Aisha was escorted back to Medina where she withdrew from political affairs.

Although Ali was able to replace Uthman's governors in Egypt and Iraq and have his sovereignty recognised there with relative ease, Uthman's relative and the incumbent governor of Greater Syria, Mu'awiya ibn Abi Sufyan, had developed a strong powerbase and an effective military against the Byzantines from the Arab tribes of Syria. Mu'awiya did not yet explicitly claim the caliphate but was determined to retain control of Syria and opposed Ali in the name of avenging his distant cousin Uthman when he was dismissed from his post. The subsequent Battle of Siffin fought between Ali's Iraqi forces and Mu'awiya's Syrian forces in 657 resulted in a stalemate after the Syrians called for arbitration by the Quran when Ali's forces had gained the upper hand. The strong peace sentiments in Ali's majority Kufan army compelled him to accept the offer, and an ill-fated arbitration committee was thus set up with representatives from Ali and Mu'awiya with a mandate to settle the dispute on the basis of the Quran. The decision to arbitrate fundamentally weakened Ali's political position as he was forced to negotiate with Mu'awiya on equal terms, and following the collapse of the arbitration process, Mu'awiya was formally recognized as caliph at a ceremony in Jerusalem by his Syrian tribal allies.

Upon learning that Mu'awiya had claimed the caliphate, Ali broke off all communications with him, mobilized for war and invoked a curse against Mu'awiya and his close retinue in his congregational prayers. Mu'awiya soon reciprocated by introducing a curse on Ali and his closest supporters, and began dispatching military units to raid and harass the civilian population loyal to Ali. Ali's coalition steadily disintegrated and many Iraqi tribal nobles secretly defected to Mu'awiya, while Mu'awiya's ally Amr ibn al-As ousted Ali's governor from Egypt in July 658. In the meantime, a group of Ali's followers that became known as the Kharijites deserted Ali, denounced him for agreeing to arbitration, and declared him and his followers, as well as Mu'awiya and the Syrians, to be infidels. They considered the blood of such infidels to be licit, and executed civilians who did not share their views. Ali crushed them at the Battle of Nahrawan, but was later assassinated by the Kharijite dissident Ibn Muljam in January 661. In the summer, Mu'awiya invaded Iraq with his Syrian army and compelled Ali's eldest son and successor Hasan, who had been chosen as caliph in Kufa, to abdicate the caliphate to him. Mu'awiya then entered Kufa and received the pledge of allegiance from the Iraqis, with his suzerainty being acknowledged throughout the Caliphate, and thus founding the Umayyad Caliphate.

== The Practice ==
After his ascension to the caliphate, Mu'awiya authorized the cursing of Ali as part of the communal prayers in the Islamic territories. Among others, this is reported by the Shia-leaning historians al-Ya'qubi (d. 897–8) and al-Mas'udi (d. 956) and the Sunni historians al-Tabari (d. 923) and Abulfeda (d. 1331). In particular, Mu'awiya ordered his governor of Kufa, Al-Mughira ibn Shu'ba, to regularly curse Ali and harass his followers, while praising Uthman and empowering his followers, as reported by al-Tabari. A tradition attributed to al-Mughira's son describes how the governor failed to convince Mu'awiya to abandon this policy and leave behind a legacy of reconciliation. Mu'awiya refused, saying that there would be no lasting fame after Muhammad, referring to the Prophet by his nickname of Ibn Abi Kabsha among the Meccan infidels. The governor then confessed to his son that he henceforth considered Mu'awiya as such an infidel, as reported by the Sunni historian al-Zubayr ibn Bakkar (d. 870). While probably not authentic, the account may nevertheless reflect the attitude towards Mu'awiya among early Sunni historians.

The cursing of Ali was continued by Umayyad rulers after Mu'awiya for sixty years, including on the Day of Arafa during the annual Hajj pilgrimage. The curse was also apparently extended to Ali's sons Hasan and Husayn, who were the grandsons of Muhammad. The practice came to an end under the Umayyad caliph Umar II (r. 717–720), often known for his piety, who reportedly replaced the curse with verses 59:15 and 16:90 from the Quran. Caliph Hisham ibn Abd al-Malik (r. 724–743) followed suit and did not curse Ali on Arafa, apparently ignoring protests by Abd-Allah ibn al-Walid, the grandson of Uthman.

The practice is viewed by Shias to have been widespread, while its existence is disputed among Sunni scholars, with one notable scholar affirming it being Abul A'la Maududi (d. 1979), the founder of the Islamic movement Jamaat-e-Islami. Maududi believed that not even al-Masjid al-Nabawi in Medina was exempted from this policy, where Ali and his relatives were cursed next to Muhammad's grave and in the presence of the descendants of Ali. The historian Husain M. Jafri (d. 2019) considers this practice a propaganda measure, while the Islamicist Wilferd Madelung suggests that the rule of Mu'awiya was largely legitimized by his revenge for the assassination of Uthman, for which Mu'awiya publicly charged Ali with complicity after the latter dismissed the former as the governor of Syria.

In a tradition cited by the Sunni historians al-Baladhuri (d. 892) and Ibn Asakir (d. 1176), the Umayyad Marwan ibn al-Hakam explains to the apolitical Ali al-Sajjad that his grandfather Ali ibn Abi Talib was the most temperate (akaff) among early Muslims to Uthman. Marwan then added that Ali was nevertheless cursed because the Umayyad rule would not be sound otherwise. The practice was also perhaps intended to provoke, identify, and then crush the supporters of Ali, who were considered a threat to Umayyad rule. Among its first victims was Hujr ibn Adi. Indeed, Ali considered it excusable for his supporters to curse him (under duress) but apparently had not allowed them to dissociate (bara'ah) themselves from him, according to the Islamicist Maria M. Dakake.

=== Hujr ibn Adi ===
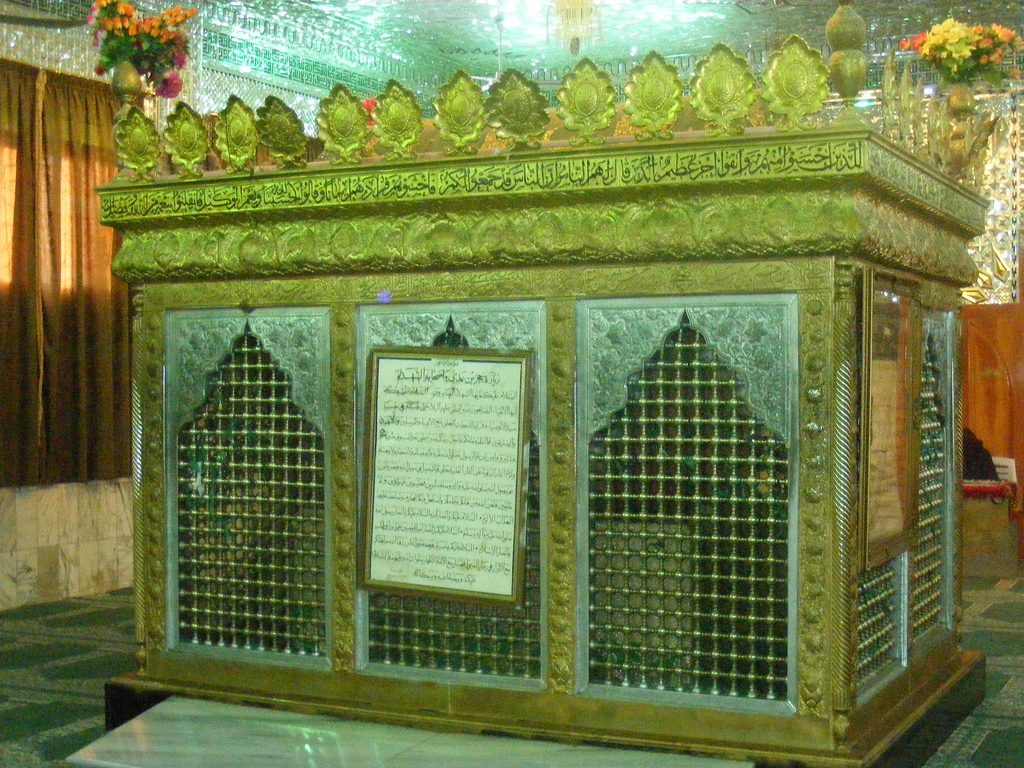
Shrine of Hujr ibn Adi in Syria

Hujr was a companion of Muhammad and an ardent supporter of Ali. Respected for his piety, Hujr was a distinguished elder of his tribe, the Kinda, though not its leader. After the accession of Mu'awiya, he regularly protested the cursing of Ali in the mosque of Kufa and led agitation against Umayyad rule, which was tolerated by al-Mughira, the erstwhile governor of Kufa, but not by his successor Ziyad ibn Abihi, who was appointed in 671 to rule Iraq and the Eastern provinces.

Ziyad arrested Hujr after he raised opposition to Mu'awiya's confiscation of the Kufan garrison's crown lands and sent him to Mu'awiya, who put Hujr on trial for high treason and then executed him and his loyalists. Before being executed, Hujr and his partisans were given the opportunity to save their lives by cursing Ali, which they refused. This was probably the first judicial execution of Muslims for high treason and was widely condemned at the time, including by Aisha bint Abi Bakr, who was otherwise hostile to Ali. The execution of Hujr was later called a pernicious crime by the Sunni theologian Hasan al-Basri (d. 728). Nevertheless, early historians are at odds about Hujr. The early Sunni traditionist Hisham is hostile to Hujr while the Shia-leaning historians Abu Mikhnaf (d. 773–4) and al-Mas'udi are sympathetic to him. Among modern authors, the execution is condemned by Madelung, while Wellhausen sides with Mu'awiya and Ziyad.

=== Other cases ===
Under the Umayyads, some Shias were compelled to curse Ali to save their lives. One instance is the Shia hadith traditionalist Atiyah ibn Sa'd (d. 729), who escaped to Fars when the revolt led by Ibn al-Ash'ath and his Iraqi followers against Umayyad rule was crushed in 701 by Al-Hajjaj ibn Yusuf, the Umayyad governor of Iraq and the East. On al-Hajjaj's orders, Atiyah was subsequently captured and demanded to curse Ali by the Umayyad commander and governor of Fars, Muhammad ibn al-Qasim. He refused and was beaten but survived and fled to Khorasan.
