= Atiyah ibn Sa'd =

Muslim scholar

Atiyah ibn Sa'd ibn Junādah al-'Awfi

Personal life
- Died: 111 AH/729 CE Kufa, Umayyad Caliphate
- Era: Umayyad
- Region: Mesopotamia

Religious life
- Religion: Islam
- Creed: Islam

Muslim leader
- Influenced by: Ali, Hasan ibn Ali, Husayn ibn Ali, Ali ibn Husayn Zayn al-Abidin, Muhammad al-Baqir, Jabir ibn Abd Allah, Ibn Abbas

Atiyah ibn Sa'd ibn Junādah al-'Awfi (Arabic: عطية بن سعد بن جنادة) [died 729] was an early Muslim scholar of Islam. He is regarded as a disputed narrator of hadith. An aged supporter of rebels and a Shia notable of the time, a disciple of the companion of Muhammad Jabir ibn Abd Allah al-Ansari and a famous narrator of Hadith, Atiyya ibn Sa'd Awfi was arrested by Muhammad bin Qasim on the orders of Al-Hajjaj and demanded that he curse Ali on the threat of punishment. Atiyya refused to curse Ali and was punished. While Maclean doesn't give the details of the punishment, early historians like Ibn Hajar Al-asqalani and Tabari record that he was flogged by 400 lashes and his head and beard shaved for humiliation and that he fled to Khurasan and returned to Iraq after the ruler had been changed.

== Family background ==
Atiyah belonged to the Judaila family of the tribe known as Qays and his patronymic appellation was Abu al-Hasan according to al-Tabari. Atiyah's mother was Greek.

== Lifetime and legacy ==
=== Arba'een Walk ===
After the battle of Karbala, the companion of Muhammad, Jabir ibn Abdullah Al-Ansari and his disciple Atiyah ibn Sa'd were the first pilgrims to visit the grave of Hussain ibn Ali in Karbala. Hearing the news of what had happened, they left Medina to pay homage and reached Karbala on the 20th of the Islamic month of Safar. This event has evolved into a religious pilgrimage, known as the Arba'een, attended by millions of Muslims every year.

=== Revolt of Al-Ash'ath ===
Atiyah supported the revolt of Ibn al-Ash'ath and his campaign against al-Hajjāj idn Yusuf, the Umayyad viceroy of Iraq under Caliph Al-Walid I. The revolt was suppressed and Ibn al-Ash’ath was killed in 85 AH, after which Atiyah fled to Fars. Al-Hajjāj ordered Muhammad bin Qasim, then governor of Fars, to summon Atiyah and demand him to curse Ali, which was a practice used by the Umayyads as a test of loyalty. If Atiyah refused, he was to be flogged 400 times and his head and beard shaved to humiliate him. Al-Tabari narrates that Atiyah refused to curse Ali and he was punished. According to Chachnama, he was the commander of the right wing of bin Qasim's army after the conquest of Armabil (modern Bela). Modern historians, like Yohanan Friedmann and André Wink, question the historical authenticity of this claim in Chachnama. Friedmann writes:-

"One of the most conspicuous elements of this kind is the large number of warriors and traditionists (scholars of Hadith) who figure in the Chachnama and are absent in other accounts of the conquest".

Other early historians like Ibn Hajar Al-Asqalani and Tabari record that he moved on to Khurasan and returned to Iraq after the ruler had been changed.

=== Khorasan ===
Al-Tabari's biography states that Atiyah moved to Khorasan and stayed there during the governorship of Qutayba ibn Muslim. After the accession of Yazid II and the appointment of Umar ibn Hubayra as the Governor of Iraq (in 103 AH / 721–722 CE), he sought permission to return to Iraq. He then moved to Kufa lived there until his death in 111 AH / 729 CE.

== Scholarly impact ==
Atiyah ibn Sa'ds reliability is disputed among Sunni scholars, although the majority opinion is that he is weak and unreliable. He is regarded as a reliable transmitter of narrations about Muhammad (hadith) by Ibn Hajar al-Asqalani and al-Tabari. In addition, he was a great exegete of the Qur'an and wrote a commentary on it in five volumes.

He was known to be a shia according to many of the scholars, and his narrations are only accepted if they do not support or have relation to the shia theology.

== Bibliography ==
- MacLean, Derryl N. (1989), Religion and Society in Arab Sind, BRILL, ISBN 90-04-08551-3
