= Muhammad ibn al-Qasim =

Umayyad general and governor of Sindh (695–715)

Muḥammad ibn al-Qāsim al-Thaqafī
- مُحَمَّدُ بْنُ الْقَاسِمِ الثَّقَفِيِّ
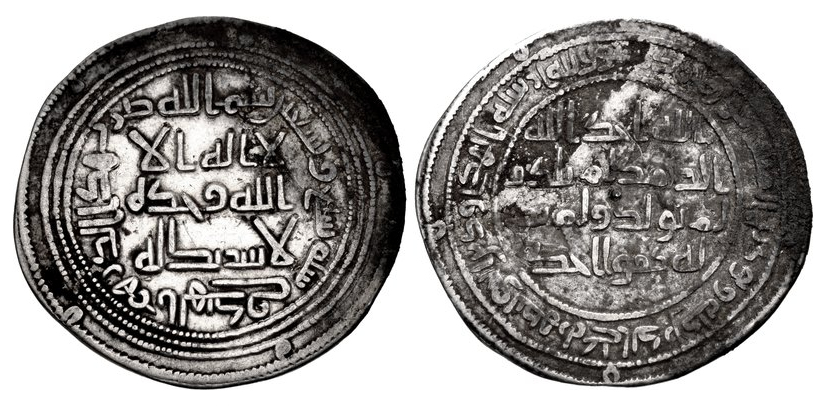
- Qasim-era Umayyad coinage of Sind (minted possibly at Multan), dated 97 AH (c. 715 CE) per obverse circular legend: "In the name of God, struck this dirham in al-Hind in the year seven and ninety"

1st Governor of al-Sindh
- In office 712 – 18 July 715
- Leader: Al-Walid I
- Preceded by: Position established
- Succeeded by: Habib ibn al-Muhallab

Personal details
- Born: 31 December 695 Taif, Hejaz, Umayyad Caliphate (present-day Saudi Arabia)
- Died: 18 July 715 (aged 19) Mosul, Umayyad Caliphate (present-day Iraq)
- Spouse: Zaynab (daughter of al-Hajjaj ibn Yusuf)
- Relations: Sulb, al-Hajjaj (brother)
- Parents: al-Qāsim ibn Yūsuf al-Thaqafī (father); Habībat al-Uzmā (mother)
- Nickname: فاتح سندھ

Military service
- Allegiance: Umayyad Caliphate
- Battles/wars: Muslim conquest of Sind (711–713); Siege of Debal (711); Battle of Aror (712)

Muḥammad ibn al-Qāsim al-Thaqafī (Arabic: مُحَمَّدُ بْنُ الْقَاسِمِ الثَّقَفِيِّ; 31 December 695–18 July 715) was an Arab military commander in service of the Umayyad Caliphate who led the Muslim conquest of Sindh (and Punjab, part of ancient Sindh), inaugurating the Umayyad campaigns in India. His military exploits led to the establishment of the Islamic province of Sindh, and the takeover of the region from the Sindhi Brahman dynasty and its ruler, Raja Dahir, who was subsequently decapitated with his head sent to al-Hajjaj ibn Yusuf in Basra. With the capture of the then-capital of Aror by Arab forces, Muhammad ibn al-Qasim became the first Muslim to have successfully captured Indian land, which marked the beginning of Muslim rule in South Asia.

Muḥammad ibn al-Qāsim al-Thaqafī belonged to the Banu Thaqif, an Arab tribe that is concentrated around the city of Taif in western Arabia. After the Muslim conquest of Persia, he was assigned as the governor of Fars, likely succeeding his uncle Muhammad ibn Yusuf al-Thaqafi. From 708 to 711, Muḥammad ibn al-Qāsim al-Thaqafī led the Sindh conquest. He established Islamic rule throughout the region, serving as governor of Sindh from 712 until his death in 715. After his last conquest of Multan (Punjab), he returned to Arabia where on the way he died in Mosul, in modern Iraq, though some sources record that his body was buried in Makran, a semi-desert coastal region in Balochistan.

== Sources ==
Information about Muhammad ibn al-Qasim and the Arab conquest of Sind in the medieval Arabic sources is limited, compared to the contemporary Muslim conquest of Transoxiana. The Futuh al-Buldan ('Conquests of the Lands') by al-Baladhuri (d. 892) contains a few pages on the conquest of Sind and Muhammad's person, while biographical information is limited to a passage in a work by al-Ya'qubi (d. 898), a few lines in the history of al-Tabari (d. 839) and scant mention in the Kitab al-Aghani (Book of songs) of Abu al-Faraj al-Isfahani. A detailed account of Muhammad's conquest of Sind and his death is found in the Chach Nama, a 13th-century Persian text. The information in the Chach Nama purportedly derives from accounts by the descendants of the Arab soldiers of the 8th-century conquest, namely qadis (judges) and imams from the Sindi cities of Alor and Bhakar who claimed descent from Muhammad's tribe, the Banu Thaqif. The orientalist Francesco Gabrieli holds the accounts likely emerged after c. 1000 and considers the Chach Nama to be a "historical romance" and "a late and doubtful source" for information about Muhammad.

== Origins and early life ==
Muhammad was born in c. 694. His birthplace was almost certainly in the Hejaz (western Arabia), either in Ta'if, the traditional home of his Thaqif tribe, or in Mecca or Medina. Following their general embrace of Islam in c. 630, members of the Thaqif gradually attained high military and administrative ranks in the nascent Caliphate and played important command and economic roles during and after the early Muslim conquests, particularly in Iraq. The tribe produced effective commanders associated with early Arab military operations against the Indian subcontinent: in c. 636 the Thaqafite governor of Bahrayn (eastern Arabia), Uthman ibn Abi al-As, dispatched naval expeditions against the Indian ports of Debal, Thane and Bharuch. The tribe's power continued to increase with the advent of the Umayyad Caliphate in 661.

Muhammad belonged to the Abu Aqil family of the Banu Awf, one of the two principal branches of the Thaqif. The Abu Aqil family gained prestige with the rise of al-Hajjaj ibn Yusuf, the paternal first cousin of Muhammad's father al-Qasim ibn Muhammad ibn al-Hakam. Al-Hajjaj was made a commander by the Umayyad caliph Abd al-Malik (r. 685–705) during the Second Muslim Civil War and killed the Umayyads' chief rival for the caliphate, Abd Allah ibn al-Zubayr, in 692, and two years later was appointed the viceroy of Iraq and the eastern Caliphate. Following his promotion, al-Hajjaj became a patron of the Thaqif and appointed several members to important posts in Iraq and its dependencies. Muhammad's father was appointed the deputy governor of Basra, though his career was otherwise undistinguished. According to a letter between Muhammad and al-Hajjaj cited by the Chach Nama, Muhammad's mother was a certain Habibat al-Uzma (Habiba the Great). The Chach Nama also indicates Muhammad had a similar-aged brother named Sulb and Arabic sources indicate he had a much younger brother named al-Hajjaj, who served as an Umayyad commander during the Alid revolt of 740.

No information is provided by the Arabic sources about Muhammad's childhood and adolescence. The modern historian Nabi Bakhsh Baloch holds that Muhammad most likely grew up partly in Ta'if and then Basra and Wasit, the provincial capital of Iraq founded by al-Hajjaj in 702. Muhammad's time in Basra, a military and intellectual centre of the Islamic world at the time, may have widened Muhammad's career horizons, while at Wasit he was likely educated and trained under al-Hajjaj's patronage.

Al-Hajjaj was highly fond of Muhammad, and considered him prestigious enough to marry his sister Zaynab, though she preferred the older Thaqafite al-Hakam ibn Ayyub ibn al-Hakam, to whom she was ultimately wed. The Kitab al-Aghani refers to Muhammad at the age of 17 as "the noblest Thaqafite of his time". In the summation of Baloch, "Muhammad grew up under favourable conditions into an able, energetic and cultured lad of fine tastes".

== Governor of Fars ==
Muhammad ibn al-Qasim's first assignment was in the province Fars in modern Iran, where he was asked to subjugate a group of Kurds. After the successful completion of the mission, he was appointed as the governor of Fars. He likely succeeded his uncle Muhammad ibn Yusuf al-Thaqafi, a brother of al-Hajjaj, who was previously a governor. The city of Shiraz is said to have been revived by Muhammad ibn al-Qasim. He built a royal villa in the city and a military camp at a short distance from it. He was also given the task of subjugating the area to the south of Shiraz, and the distant area of Jurjan near the Caspian Sea.

Fars might have also had at this time some of the rebels leftover from the revolt of Ibn al-Ash'ath, which almost brought down the rule of al-Hajjaj. An aged supporter of rebels and a Shia notable of the time, a disciple of the companion of Jabir ibn Abd Allah al-Ansari and a famous narrator of Hadith, Atiyya ibn Sa'd al-Awfi was arrested by Muhammad ibn al-Qasim on the orders of Al-Hajjaj and demanded that he curse Ali on the threat of punishment. Atiyya refused to curse Ali and was punished. While Maclean doesn't give the details of the punishment, early historians like ibn Hajar al-Asqalani and Tabari record that he was flogged by 400 lashes and his head and beard shaved for humiliation and that he fled to Khurasan and returned to Iraq after the ruler had been changed.

== Background on Sindh ==
=== Umayyad interest in Sindh ===
Map of expansion of Umayyad Caliphate

According to Wink, Umayyad interest in the region was galvanised by the operation of the Meds (a tribe of Scythians living in Sindh) and others. The Meds had engaged in piracy on Sassanid shipping in the past, from the mouth of the Tigris to the Sri Lankan coast, in their bawarij and now were able to prey on Arab shipping from their bases at Kutch, Debal and Kathiawar. At the time, Sindh was the wild frontier region of al-Hind, inhabited mostly by semi-nomadic tribes whose activities disturbed much of the Western Indian Ocean. Muslim sources insist that it was these persistent activities along increasingly important Indian trade routes by Debal pirates and others which forced the Arabs to subjugate the area, in order to control the seaports and maritime routes of which Sindh was the nucleus, as well as the overland passage. During Hajjaj's governorship, the Meds of Debal in one of their raids had kidnapped Muslim women travelling from Sri Lanka to Arabia, thus providing grounds to the rising power of the Umayyad Caliphate that enabled them to gain a foothold in the Makran, Balochistan and Sindh regions.

Also cited as a reason for this campaign was the policy of providing refuge to Sassanids fleeing the Arab advance and to Arab rebels from the Umayyad consolidation of their rule.

These Arabs were imprisoned later on by Governor Deebal Partaab Rai. A letter written by an Arab girl named Nahed who escaped from the prison of Partab Rai asked Hajjaj Bin Yusuf for help. When Hajjaj asked Dahir for the release of prisoners and compensation, the latter refused on the ground that he had no control over those. Al-Hajjaj sent Muhammad ibn al-Qasim for action against Sindh in 711.

The mawali (new non-Arab converts) who were usually allied with Al-Hajjaj's political opponents and thus were frequently forced to participate in battles on the frontier of the Umayyad Caliphate, such as Kabul, Sindh and Transoxania. An actual push into the region had been out of favour as an Arab policy since the time of the Rashidun Caliph Umar bin Khattab, who upon receipt of reports of it being an inhospitable and poor land, had stopped further expeditionary ventures into the region.

== Conquest of valley of Sindh ==
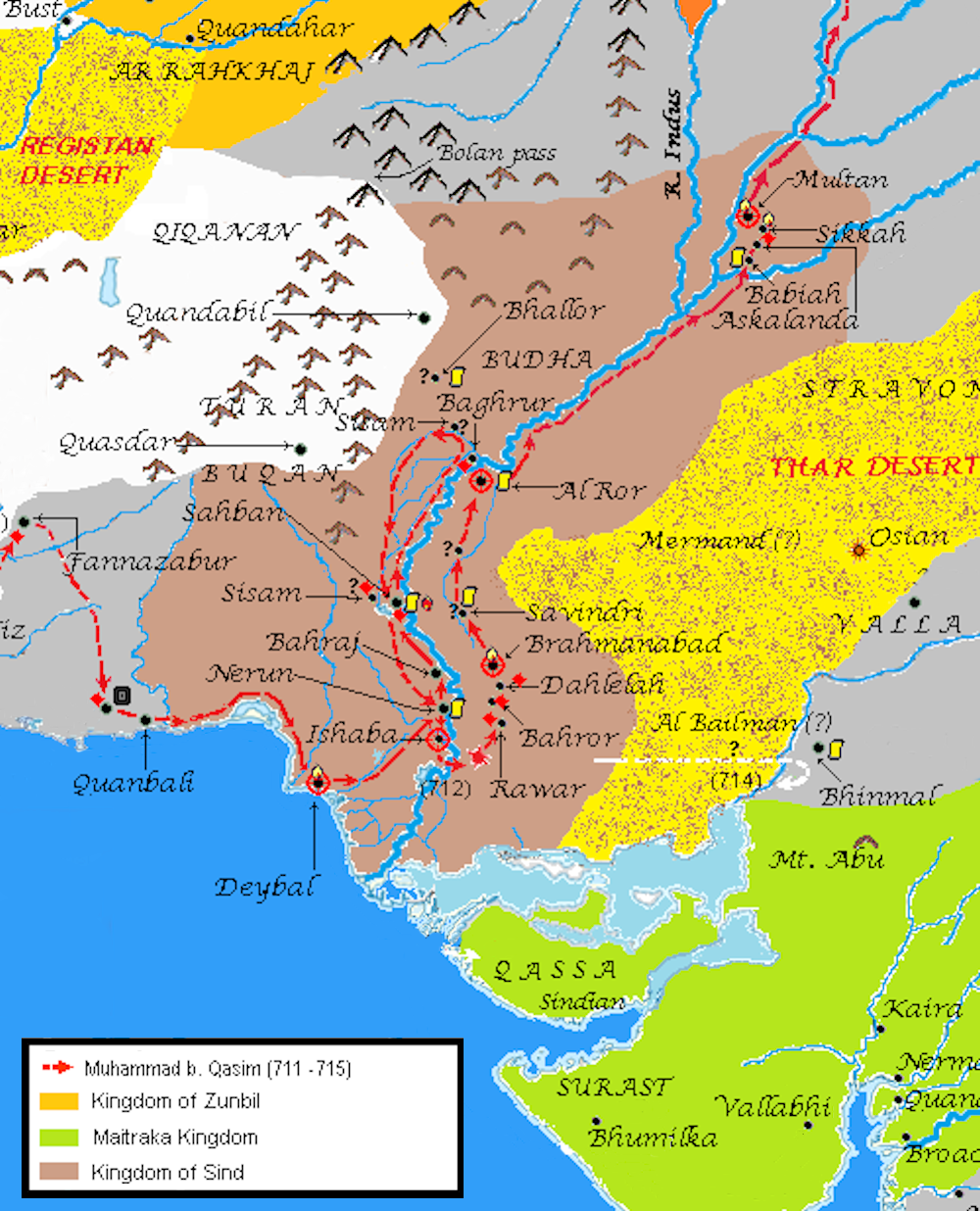
Muhammad ibn al-Qasim's conquest of Sindh (711-715 CE). Desert areas (Registan Desert and Thar Desert) Zunbils Kingdom of Sindh (c. 632–712 CE) Maitraka Kingdom (c. 475–776 CE)

Hajjaj had put more care and planning into this campaign than the second campaign. Al-Hajjaj gave Muhammad ibn al-Qasim command of the expedition between 708 and 711, when he was only 15–17 years old, apparently because two previous Umayyad commanders had not been successful in punishing Sindh's ruler Raja Dahir for his failure to prevent pirates from disrupting Muslim shipping off the coast of Sindh. Al-Hajjaj superintended this campaign from Kufa by maintaining close contact with Muhammad ibn al-Qasim in the form of regular reports for which purpose special messengers were deputed between Basra and Sindh. The army which departed from Shiraz under Muhammad ibn al-Qasim consisted of 6,000 Syrian cavalry and detachments of mawali (sing. mawla; non-Arab, Muslim freedmen) from Iraq. At the borders of Sindh he was joined by an advance guard and six thousand camel cavalry and later, reinforcements from the governor of Makran were transferred directly to Debal (Daybul), at the mouth of the Indus, by sea along with five manjaniks (catapults). The army that eventually captured Sindh would later be swelled by the Jats and Meds as well as other irregulars who heard of the Arab successes in Sindh. When Muhammad ibn al-Qasim passed through the Makran desert while raising his forces, he had to subdue the restive towns of Fannazbur and Arman Belah (Lasbela), both of which had previously been conquered by the Arabs.

The first town assaulted in Muhammad ibn al-Qasim's Sindh campaign was Debal and upon the orders of al-Hajjaj, he exacted retribution on Debal by giving no quarter to its residents or priests and destroying its great temple. From Debal, the Arab army then marched north-east taking towns such as Nerun and Sadusan (Sehwan) without fighting. One-fifth of the war booty including slaves were remitted to al-Hajjaj and the Caliph. The conquest of these towns was accomplished with relative ease; however, Dahir's armies being prepared on the other side of the Indus (Note: The Indus River during this time flowed to the east of Nerun, but a 10th-century earthquake caused the river to change to its course) had not yet been confronted. In preparation to meet them, Muhammad returned to Nerun to resupply and receive reinforcements sent by al-Hajjaj. Camped on the east bank of the Indus, Muhammad ibn al-Qasim sent emissaries and bargained with the river Jats and boatmen. Upon securing the aid of Mokah Basayah, "the King of the island of Bet", Muhammad crossed over the river where he was joined by the forces of the Thakore of Bhatta and the western Jats.

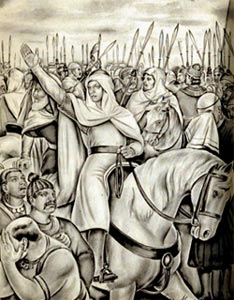
Muhammad ibn al-Qasim,leading his troops in Sindh in 711

At Aror (Rohri) Muhammad ibn al-Qasim was met by Dahir's forces and the eastern Jats in battle. Dahir died in the battle, his forces were defeated and Muhammad ibn al-Qasim took control of Sindh.

Soon the capitals of the other provinces, Brahmanabad, Alor (Battle of Aror) and Multan, were captured alongside other in-between towns with only light Muslim casualties. Multan was a key site in the Hindu religion. Usually after a siege of a few weeks or months the Arabs gained a city through the intervention of heads of mercantile houses with whom subsequent treaties and agreements would be settled. After battles all fighting men were executed and their wives and children enslaved in considerable numbers and the usual fifth of the booty and slaves were sent to al-Hajjaj. The general populace was encouraged to carry on with their trades and taxes and tributes settled.

The conquest of Sindh (and areas of Punjab) in modern-day Pakistan, although costly, was a major gain for the Umayyad Caliphate. However, further gains were halted by Hindu kingdoms during Arab campaigns. The Arabs attempted to invade India but they were defeated by North Indian kings Bappa Rawal of Guhila dynasty, Nagabhata, of the Gurjara-Pratihara dynasty and by the South Indian emperor Vikramaditya II of the Chalukya dynasty in the early 8th century. After the failure of further expeditions on Kathiawar, the Arab chroniclers conceded that the Abbasid caliph al-Mahdi (r. 775–785) "gave up the project of conquering any part of India."

=== Military and political strategy ===
The military strategy had been outlined by Al-Hajjaj in a letter sent to Muhammad ibn al-Qasim:

My ruling is given: Kill anyone belonging to the ahl-i-harb (combatants); arrest their sons and daughters for hostages and imprison them. Whoever does not fight against us...grant them aman (peace and safety) and settle their tribute [amwal] as dhimmah (protected person)...

The Arabs' first concern was to facilitate the conquest of Sindh with the fewest casualties while also trying to preserve the economic infrastructure. Towns were given two options: submit to Islamic authority peacefully or be attacked by force (anwattan), with the choice governing their treatment upon capture. The capture of towns was usually accomplished by means of a treaty with a party from among the enemy, who were then extended special privileges and material rewards. There were two types of such treaties, "Sulh" or "ahd-e-wasiq (capitulation)" and "aman (surrender/ peace)". Among towns and fortresses that were captured through force of arms, Muhammad ibn al-Qasim performed executions of ahl-i-harb (fighting men) as part of his military strategy, whose surviving dependants were enslaved.

== Administration of Sindh ==
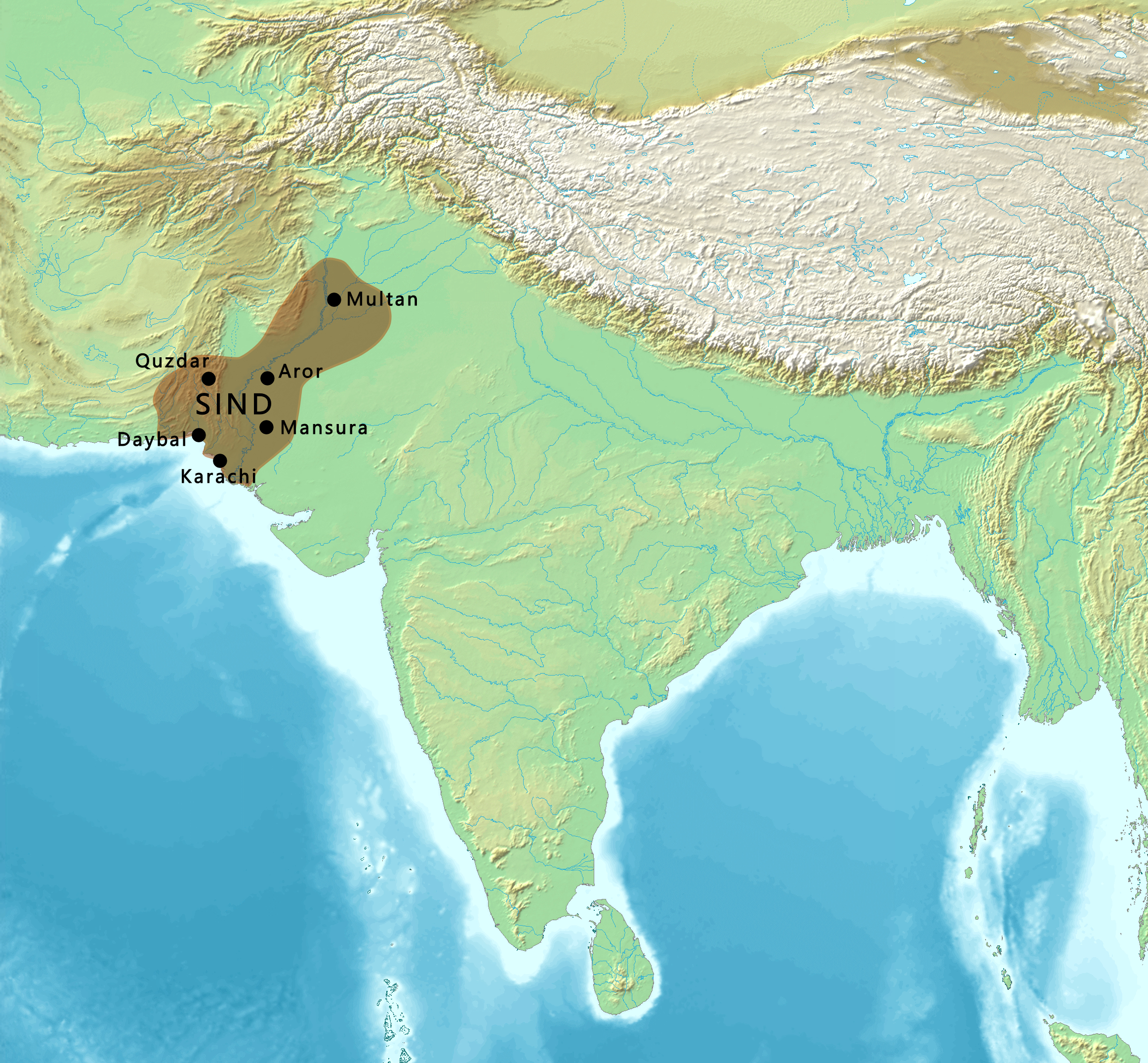
Map of the Caliphal province of Sindh, a province of the Abbasid Caliphate, circa 750 CE.

After the conquest, Muhammad ibn al-Qasim's task was to set up an administrative structure for a stable Muslim state that incorporated a newly conquered alien land, inhabited by non-Muslims. He adopted a conciliatory policy, asking for acceptance of Muslim rule by the natives in return for non-interference in their religious practice, so long as the natives paid their taxes and tribute. In return, the state provided protection to non-Muslim from any foreign attacks and enemies. He established Islamic Sharia law over the people of the region; however, Hindus were allowed to rule their villages and settle their disputes according to their own laws, and traditional hierarchical institutions, including the village headmen (rais) and chieftains (dihqans) were maintained. A Muslim officer called an amil was stationed with a troop of cavalry to manage each town on a hereditary basis

Everywhere taxes (mal) and tribute (kharaj) were settled and hostages taken — occasionally this also meant the custodians of temples. Non-Muslim natives were excused from military service and from payment of the religiously mandated tax system levied upon Muslims called Zakat, the tax system levied upon them instead was the jizya - a progressive tax, being heavier on the upper classes and light for the poor. In addition, three percent of government revenue was allocated to the Brahmins.

=== Incorporation of ruling elite into administration ===
During his administration, Hindus and Buddhists were inducted into the administration as trusted advisors and governors. A Hindu, Kaksa, was at one point the second most important member of his administration. Dahir's prime minister and various chieftains were also incorporated into the administration.

=== Clashes with the Jats ===
Significant medieval Muslim chronicles such as the Chach Nama, Zainul-Akhbar and Tarikh-I-Baihaqi have recorded battles of Jats of Sindh and Balochistan against the invading forces of Muhammad ibn al-Qasim and other Muslims.

The eastern Hindu Jats supported the Sindhi king, Dahir, against the Arab Muslim invaders, whereas the western Jats aligned with Muhammad bin Qasim (708-711 CE) against Dahir. At battle of Aror (Rohri), the united forces of Dahir and the eastern Jats jointly fought against Muhammad ibn al-Qasim. Rani Bai, the queen of King Dahir, had Jat origins, her father was Jat. Al-Baladhuri's historical accounts document that the Jat people displayed a strong sense of independence, following the Muslim incursions into Sindh, some Jats, along with their livestock (buffalo), were taken to Iraq where they engaged in disruptive and rebellious activities. After defeating Dahir, Muhammad bin al-Qasim turned against the Jats and Lohanas, the Chach Nama, Zainul-Akhbar and Tarikh-i Bayhaqi have recorded battles between Hindu Jats and forces of Muhammad ibn Qasim.

After the death of Hajjaj in 714 CE, the son of Dahir, Jaisimba (Jaisiah) reconquered the Brahmanabad during the time of Umayyad caliph Sulayman ibn Abd al-Malik (r. 715-717). Jaisimba was later killed in a battle with Umayyad governor of Sindh, Junayd ibn Abd ar-Rahman al-Murri (r. 723 to 726 CE). However, the Jats and Meds continue to mount a formidable resistance against the Muslim forces around the ancient Sindhi capital of Alor (near Sukkur) during the time of caliph Harun al-Rashid (r. 786-809), in which Muslims did not fare well. David Nicolle writes that "The resident Buddhist Jats [of Sindh] remained formidable warriors until they dropped out of historical records from the 11th to 17th century."

=== Religion ===
Lane-Poole writes that, "as a rule Muslim government was at once tolerant and economic". The preference of collection of jizya over the conversion to Islam is a major economic motivator. Hindus and Buddhists who were classified as Dhimmis had to pay mandatory Jizya instead of Zakat paid by Muslims. Contrastingly preferential treatment was given to a small number of people who were converted to Islam by "exempting them from Jizya in lieu of paying the Zakat". Muhammad ibn al-Qasim fixed the Zakat at 10% of the agricultural produce. Others had to pay the mandatory jizya. "In Al-Biruni's narrative", according to Manan Ahmed Asif – a historian of Islam in South and South East Asia, "Muhammad bin Qasim first asserts the superiority of Islam over the polytheists by committing a taboo (killing a cow) and publicly soiling the idol (giving the cow meat as an offering)" before allowing the temple to continue as a place of worship.

A religious Islamic office, "sadru-I-Islam al affal", was created to oversee the secular governors. The native hereditary elites were reappointed with the title of Rana. According to Yohanan Friedmann, Muhammad ibn al-Qasim declared that the Brahmins of Brahmanabad were good people.

While proselytization occurred, given the social dynamics of areas of Sindh conquered by Muslim, the spread of Islam was slow and took centuries. No mass conversions to Islam took place and some temples escaped destruction such as the Sun Temple of Multan on payment of jizya. In the Arab settlers controlled areas of Sindh and Multan, conversion to Islam occurred only slowly, not on a massive scale. Majority of the population continued to remain Hindu who had to pay the jizya imposed by the Muslim state.

It has been reported that Muhammad ibn al-Qasim met with Sayyida Ruqayya bint Ali (Bibi Pak Daman) in India, a daughter of Ali ibn Abi Talib the son-in-law of the Islamic prophet Muhammad and the fourth Rashidun caliph (r. 656-661). The events of the massacre of Muhammad's family at Karbala (680 CE) caused many relatives of Muhammad including Ruqayyah to migrate to Makran. Among her potential assassins had been Muhammad Bin Qasim who later switched allegiances and became a supporter of Ruqayyah after learning of the sufferings experienced by the family of Muhammad.

== Death ==
Al-Hajjaj died in 714, followed a year later by Caliph al-Walid I, who was succeeded by his brother Sulayman. The latter took revenge against the generals and officials who had been close to al-Hajjaj. Sulayman owed political support to al-Hajjaj's opponents and so recalled both of al-Hajjaj's successful generals Qutayba ibn Muslim, the conqueror of Transoxiana (Central Asia), and Muhammad. He also appointed the son of the distinguished general al-Muhallab ibn Abi Sufra, Yazid, who was once imprisoned and tortured by al-Hajjaj, as the governor of Fars, Kirman, Makran, and Sind; he immediately placed Muhammad in chains.

Muhammad ibn al-Qasim died on 18 July 715 in Mosul, which is a part of the modern-day Iraq. Some sources say that his body was transferred to Makran in Balochistan at the Hingol National Park, which is part of modern-day Pakistan.

There are two different accounts regarding the details of Muhammad ibn al-Qasim's fate:

- According to al-Baladhuri, Muhammad was killed due to a family feud with the governor of Iraq. Sulayman was hostile toward Muhammad because apparently he had followed the order of Hajjaj to declare Sulayman's right of succession void in all territories conquered by him. When Muhammad received the news of the death of al-Hajjaj, he returned to Aror. Muhammad was later arrested under the orders of the Caliph by the replacement governor of Sindh, Yazid ibn Abi Kabsha al-Saksaki, who worked under the new military governor of Iraq, Yazid ibn al-Muhallab, and the new fiscal governor, the mawla Salih ibn Abd al-Rahman. Salih, whose brother was executed by al-Hajjaj, tortured Muhammad and his relatives to death. The account of his death by al-Baladhuri is brief compared to the one in the Chach Nama.
- The Chach Nama narrates a tale in which Muhammad's demise is attributed to the daughters of Raja Dahir of Aror (Sind), Surya Devi and Parimal Devi, who had been taken captive during the campaign. Upon capture, their mother had been made a slave of ibn Qasim himself, while the two sisters had been sent on as presents to the Caliph for his harem in the capital Baghdad (however, Baghdad had not yet been built and the actual capital was Damascus). The account relates that they then tricked the Caliph into believing that ibn Qasim had violated them before sending them on, and as a result of this subterfuge, ibn Qasim was wrapped and stitched in oxen hides, and sent to Syria, which resulted in his death en route from suffocation. This narrative attributes their motive for this subterfuge to securing vengeance for their father's death. Upon discovering this subterfuge, the Caliph is recorded to have been filled with remorse and ordered the sisters buried alive in a wall.

== Aftermath ==
After Muhammad ibn al-Qasim's departure, the next appointed Arab governor died on arrival. Dahir's son recaptured Brahmanabad and c. 720, he was granted pardon and included in the administration in return for converting to Islam. Soon, however, he recanted and split off when the Umayyads were embroiled in a succession crisis. Later, Junayd ibn Abd al-Rahman al-Murri killed Jaisiah and recaptured the territory before his successors once again struggled to hold and keep it.

Arab states in South Asia

During the Abbasid period, c. 870, the local emirs shook off all allegiance to the caliphs and by the 10th century the region was split into two separate states, Mansurah on the lower Indus and Multan on the upper Indus, both were the major Arab principalities in South Asia, which were soon captured by Ismailis who set up an independent Fatimid state. The Arab conquest remained checked in what is now the south of Pakistan for three centuries by powerful Hindu monarchs to the north and east until the arrival of Mahmud of Ghazni.

== Controversy ==
There is controversy regarding the conquest and subsequent conversion of Sindh. This is usually voiced in two antagonistic perspectives viewing Muhammad ibn al-Qasim's actions.

His conquest, as described by Stanley Lane-Poole, in Medieval India (Published in 1970 by Haskell House Publishers Ltd), was "liberal". He imposed the customary poll tax, took hostages for good conduct and spared peoples' lives and lands. He even left their shrines undesecrated: 'The temples;' he proclaimed, 'shall be inviolate, like the churches of the Christians, the synagogues of the Jews and altars of the Magians'. In the same text, however, it is mentioned that "Occasional desecration of Hindu fanes took place... but such demonstrations were probably rare sops to the official conscience...", as destruction of temples and civilian massacres still took place.

1. Coercive conversion has been attributed to early historians such as Elliot, Cousens, Majumdar and Vaidya. They hold the view that the conversion of Sindh was necessitated. Muhammad ibn al-Qasim's numerical inferiority is said to explain any instances of apparent religious toleration, with the destruction of temples seen as a reflection of the more basic, religiously motivated intolerance.
2. Voluntary conversion has been attributed to Thomas W. Arnold and modern Muslim historians such as Habib and Qureishi. They believe that the conquest was largely peaceful, and the conversion entirely so, and that the Arab forces enacted liberal, generous and tolerant policies. These historians mention the "praiseworthy conduct of Arab Muslims" and attribute their actions to a "superior civilizational complex".

Various polemical perceptions of Islam, Hinduism and Buddhism are also reflected in this debate. The period of Muhammad ibn al-Qasim's rule has been called by U.T. Thakkur "the darkest period in Sindh history", with the records speaking of massive forced conversions, temple destruction, slaughters and genocides; the people of Sindh, described as inherently pacifist due to their Hindu/Buddhist religious inclinations, had to adjust to the conditions of "barbarian inroad". On one extreme, the Arab Muslims are seen as being compelled by religious stricture to conquer and forcibly convert Sindh, but on the other hand, they can be seen as being respectful and tolerant of non-Muslims as part of their religious duty, with conversion being facilitated by the vitality, equality and morals of the Islamic religion. Citations of towns taken either violently or bloodlessly, reading back into Arab Sindh information belonging to a later date and accounts such as those of the forcible circumcision of Brahmins at Debal or Muhammad ibn al-Qasim's consideration of Hindu sentiment in forbidding the slaughter of cows are used as examples for one particular view or the other.

Some historians strike a middle ground, saying that Muhammad ibn al-Qasim was torn between the political expediency of making peace with the Hindus and Buddhists; having to call upon non-Muslims to serve under him as part of his mandate to administer newly conquered land; and orthodoxy by refraining from seeking the co-operation of "infidels". It is contended that he may have struck a middle ground, conferring the status of Dhimmi upon the native Sindhis and permitting them to participate in his administration, but treating them as "non-citizens" (i.e. in the Caliphate, but not of it).

While Muhammad ibn al-Qasim's warring was clearly at times brutal, he is supposed to have said of Hinduism that 'the idol temple is similar to the churches of the Christians, (to the synagogues) of the Jews and to the fire temples of the Zoroastrians' (mā al-budd illā ka-kanāʾis al-naṣārā wa ’l-yahūd wa-buyūt nīrān al-madjūs). This 'seems to be the earliest statement justifying the inclusion of the Hindus in the category of ahl al-dhimma, leading Muhammad to be falsely viewed by many modern Muslims as a paragon of religious tolerance.

== Legacy ==
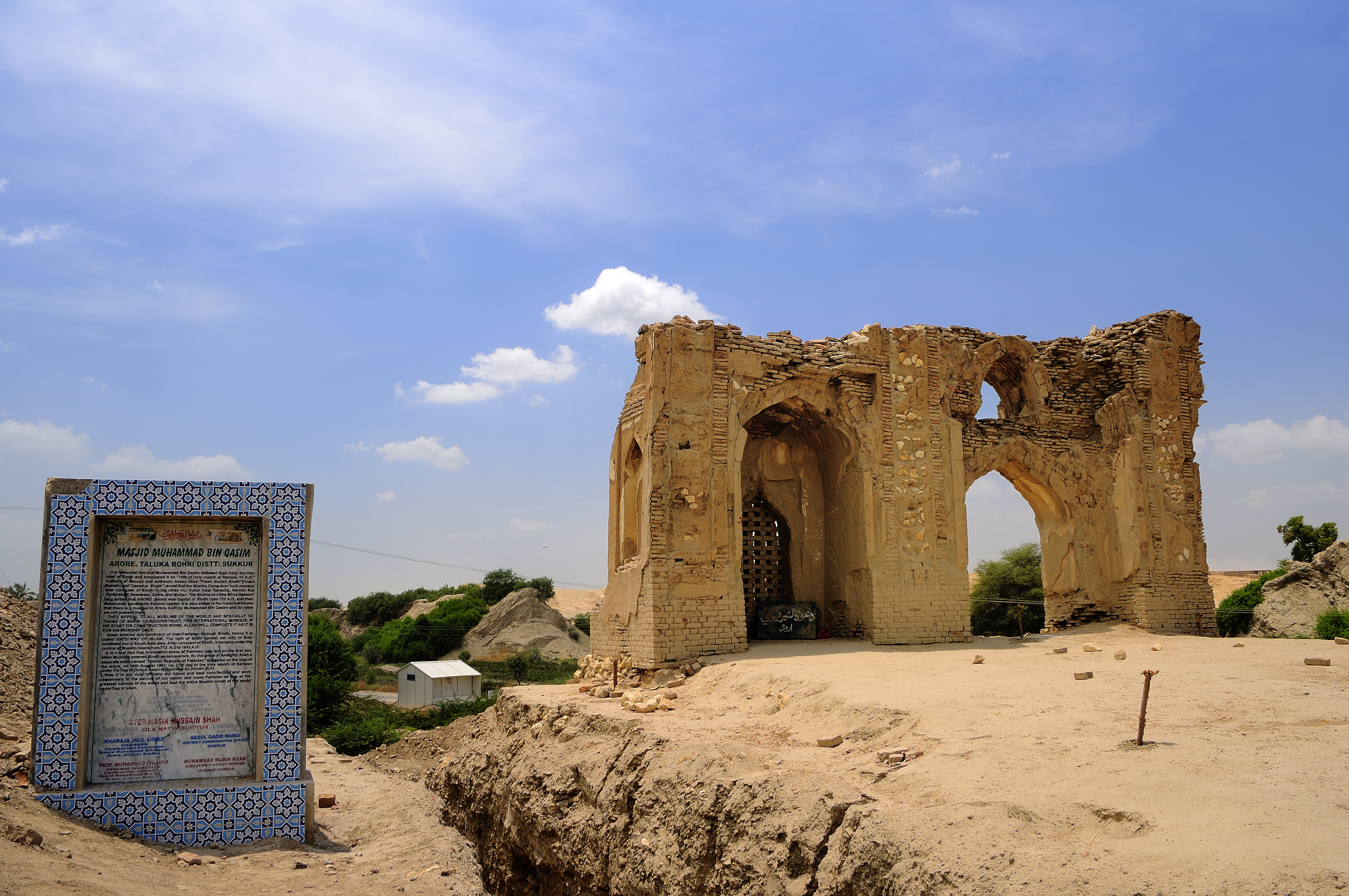
Muhammad ibn al-Qasim Mosque in Sukkur, Pakistan, dedicated to the leader

Muhammad ibn al-Qasim's presence and rule were very brief. His conquest for the Umayyads brought Sindh into the orbit of the Muslim world. After the conquest of Sindh, he adopted the view of some Islamic scholars which regarded Hindus, Buddhists and Jains as "dhimmis" and "People of the Book", allowing them religious freedom as long as they continued to pay the tax known as "jizya". This approach would prove critical to the way Muslim rulers ruled in India over the next centuries. Coastal trade and a Muslim colony in Sindh allowed for cultural exchanges and the arrival of Sufi missionaries to expand Muslim influence.

From Debal, which remained an important port until the 12th century, commercial links with the Persian Gulf and the Middle East intensified as Sindh became the "hinge of the Indian Ocean Trade and overland passway." Muhammad Ali Jinnah, the founder of Pakistan, claimed that the Pakistan movement started when the first Muslim put his foot on the soil of Sindh, the Gateway of Islam in India. He is often referred to as the first Pakistani according to Pakistan Studies curriculum. Yom-e Bab ul-Islam is observed in Pakistan in honour of Muhammad ibn al-Qasim.

Port Qasim, Pakistan's second major port, is named in honor of Muhammad ibn al-Qasim. Bagh Ibn Qasim is the largest park in Karachi (Sindh, Pakistan), named in honour of Muhammad ibn al-Qasim. Ibn-e-Qasim Bagh Stadium, Multan is a multi-use stadium named after Muhammad ibn al-Qasim. The Pakistan Naval Station Qasim, or PNS Qasim, is the major naval special operations base for the amphibious special operations forces in the Pakistan Navy named after Muhammad ibn al-Qasim. Bin Qasim in Karachi is named after Muhammad ibn al-Qasim.

In the 1996 PTV Series Labbaik, he was played by Babar Ali and 2019 Egyptian animated musical film The Knight and the Princess.

== See also ==
- Jat people in Islamic history
- Muslim conquests on the Indian subcontinent
- Caliphate campaigns in India
- Abdullah Shah Ghazi
- Shaikh Habib Al-Raee
- The Knight and the Princess

== Bibliography ==
- Baloch, Nabi Bakhsh (October 1953). "Muhammad ibn al-Qasim: A Study of His Family Background and Personality". Islamic Culture. 27 (4): 242–271.
- Gabrieli, Francesco (September–December 1965). "Muḥammad ibn Qāsim ath-Thaqafī and the Arab Conquest of Sind". East and West. 15 (3): 281–295. JSTOR 29754928.
- Friedmann, Y. (1993). "Muḥammad b. al-Ḳāsim". In Bosworth, C. E.; van Donzel, E.; Heinrichs, W. P. & Pellat, Ch. (eds.). The Encyclopaedia of Islam, Second Edition. Volume VII: Mif–Naz. Leiden: E. J. Brill. pp. 405–406. ISBN 978-90-04-09419-2.
- Gier, Nicholas F. (2014), "From Mongols to Mughals : Hindu–Muslim relations in medieval India", The Origins of Religious Violence: An Asian Perspective, Lexington Books, ISBN 978-0-7391-9223-8
  - Nicholas F. Gier, From Mongols to Mughals: Religious violence in India 9th-18th centuries, Presented at the Pacific Northwest Regional Meeting American Academy of Religion, Gonzaga University, May 2006.
- Lane-Poole, Stanley Medieval India under Mohammedan Rule, 712-1764, G.P. Putnam's Sons. New York, 1970
- Lecker, M. (2000). "Thakīf". In Bearman, P. J.; Bianquis, Th.; Bosworth, C. E.; van Donzel, E. & Heinrichs, W. P. (eds.). The Encyclopaedia of Islam, Second Edition. Volume X: T–U. Leiden: E. J. Brill. p. 432. ISBN 978-90-04-11211-7.
- Schimmel, Annemarie, Islam in the Indian Subcontinent, Brill Academic Publishers, Jan 1, 1980, ISBN 90-04-06117-7
- Appleby, R Scott & Martin E Marty, Fundamentalisms Comprehended, University of Chicago Press, May 1, 2004, ISBN 0-226-50888-9
- Wink, André (1996) [first published 1990], Al-Hind: The Making of the Indo-Islamic World, Vol 1: Early Medieval India and the Expansion of Islam (Third ed.), Brill, ISBN 0391041738
  - Wink, André (2002) [first published 1990], Al-Hind: The Making of the Indo-Islamic World, Vol 1: Early Medieval India and the Expansion of Islam, Brill, ISBN 9780391041738
- Keay, John, India: A History, Grove Press, May 1, 2001, ISBN 0-8021-3797-0
- MacLean, Derryl N. (1989), Religion and Society in Arab Sind, BRILL, ISBN 90-04-08551-3
