= Battle of Aror =

8th century battle between Umayyads and Brahmin dynasty of Sindh

- Part of Umayyad conquest of Sindh
| Date | 20 June 712 |
| Location | Aror, Sindh |
| Result | Umayyad victory |

Belligerents
| Umayyad Caliphate | Brahmin dynasty of Sindh |

Commanders and leaders
| Muhammad ibn al-Qasim | Raja Dahir † |

Strength
| 20,000 | 20,000–25,000 (Chach Nama); 50,000 (modern estimates) |

The Battle of Aror took place in 712 AD between the Umayyad forces under Muhammad ibn al-Qasim and the army of the Brahmin dynasty of Sindh under Raja Dahir. At the Battle of Aror, Muhammad ibn al-Qasim was met by Dahir's forces in battle. It was the last military conflict involving Raja Dahir, whose army was defeated by the Umayyads near the Indus River, and Dahir was killed.

== Battle ==
The battle took place on the left bank of the Indus. The names of that place on those occasions were Jiwar, Bet, and Rawer. After besieging Debal, Muhammad ibn Qasim joined with 2,000 cavalry from Persia in addition to the rest of his forces, making it 20,000-strong, and marched towards Aror. Raja Dahir's forces opposed him. According to the Chach Nama, the strength of the troops was 20,000-25,000. According to modern historians such as K. S. Lal, the forces included not less than 50,000 men.

Qasim, seeing the imbalance, took advantage of the ground. He waited for Dahir to attack after getting in a good position. During the battle, a fireball struck Dahir's elephant, and the elephant bore Dahir off the field. Even though Dahir fought, he was killed by an arrow to his neck, and his army faced high casualties, resulting in a Umayyad victory.

== Aftermath ==
After the victory, Muhammed ibn Qasim found the body of Raja Dahir and sent it to Al-Hajjaj. The Rani governed the capital after Dahir's death. Ibn Qasim later dispatched his army to besiege the fort of Rewar. Since her son had retreated to Brahmanabad in war, the queen of Raja Dahir, Rani Bai, committed jauhar to avoid being captured by the army of Mohammed ibn Qasim.
