= Siege of Debal =

Battle between Umayyads and Hindus of Sindh

- Part of Umayyad campaigns in India and Umayyad conquest of Sindh, Muslim conquests in the Indian subcontinent
Date	712 AD
Location	Debal, Sindh 24°51′36″N 67°0′36″E
Result	Umayyad victory
Territorial changes	Debal is conquered by the Umayyads

Belligerents
Umayyad Caliphate	Kingdom of Sindh

Commanders and leaders
Muhammad ibn al-Qasim	Unknown (nephew of Raja Dahir) †

Units involved
6,000 Syrian Cavalry; 3,000 Camelry; Unknown number of Arab soldiers	4,000 Rajputs; 3,000 Brahmins
- Location of Debal, Karachi Siege of Debal (Pakistan) Siege of Debal (South Asia)

The Siege of Debal, also known as the Siege of Debul, took place in the autumn of 712 AD, in which the Umayyad forces under Muhammed Ibn al-Qasim besieged Debal, a city under the Brahmin dynasty of Sindh ruled by Raja Dahir. The Umayyads defeated the Chach loyalists on the orders of the governor of Iraq, Al-Hajjaj ibn Yusuf, and captured it.

== Battle ==
In 711, Muhammed ibn Qasim marched towards Debal with 6,000 Syrian cavalry and 3,000 camelry with a good number of Arab soldiers. The city was commanded by a nephew of Dahir with an army of 4,000 Rajputs and 3,000 Brahmins. The Umayyad forces encamped outside the city walls for seven days waiting for permission from the governor of Iraq, Al-Hajjaj ibn Yusuf, to attack. On the eight day, Muhammed ibn Qasim received the letter from Al-Hajjaj and eventually the Umayyad Army scaled the walls of Debal and its people surrendered.
