= Chach dynasty =

Last Hindu dynasty to rule Sindh (632–712)

- c. 632–712
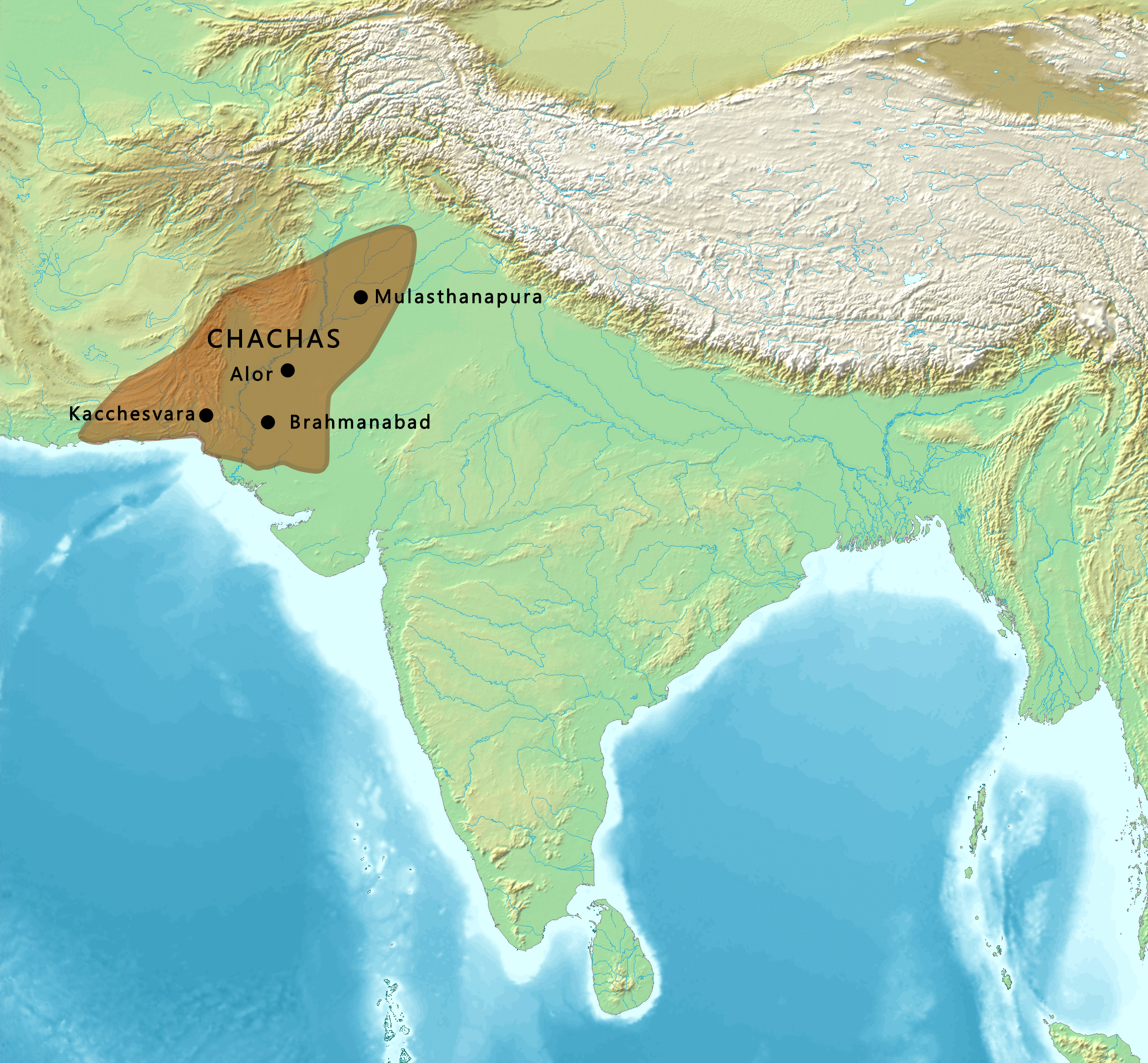
- Territory of the Chachas and neighbouring polities circa 600–650 CE.
- Capital: Aror
- Common languages: Sanskrit
- Religion: Hinduism
- Government: Monarchy
- Maharaja
  - 632–671: Chach of Aror
  - 671–679: Chandar of Sindh
  - 695–712: Raja Dahir
- History
  - Chach founds the dynasty: c. 632
  - Annexed by the Umayyad Caliphate: 712
Preceded by	Succeeded by
Rai Kingdom	Caliphal province of Sind
- Today part of: Pakistan; India

The Chach or Chacha dynasty (c. 632–712), also called the Silaij dynasty, was a Hindu dynasty that ruled the regions of Sindh, Makran and Multan after overthrowing the Buddhist Rai dynasty. Most of the information about its existence comes from the Chachnama, a historical account of the dynasty.

Members of the dynasty, such as Hullishāh and Shishah, continued to administer parts of Sindh under the Umayyad Caliphate's province of Sind after it fell in 712.

== History ==
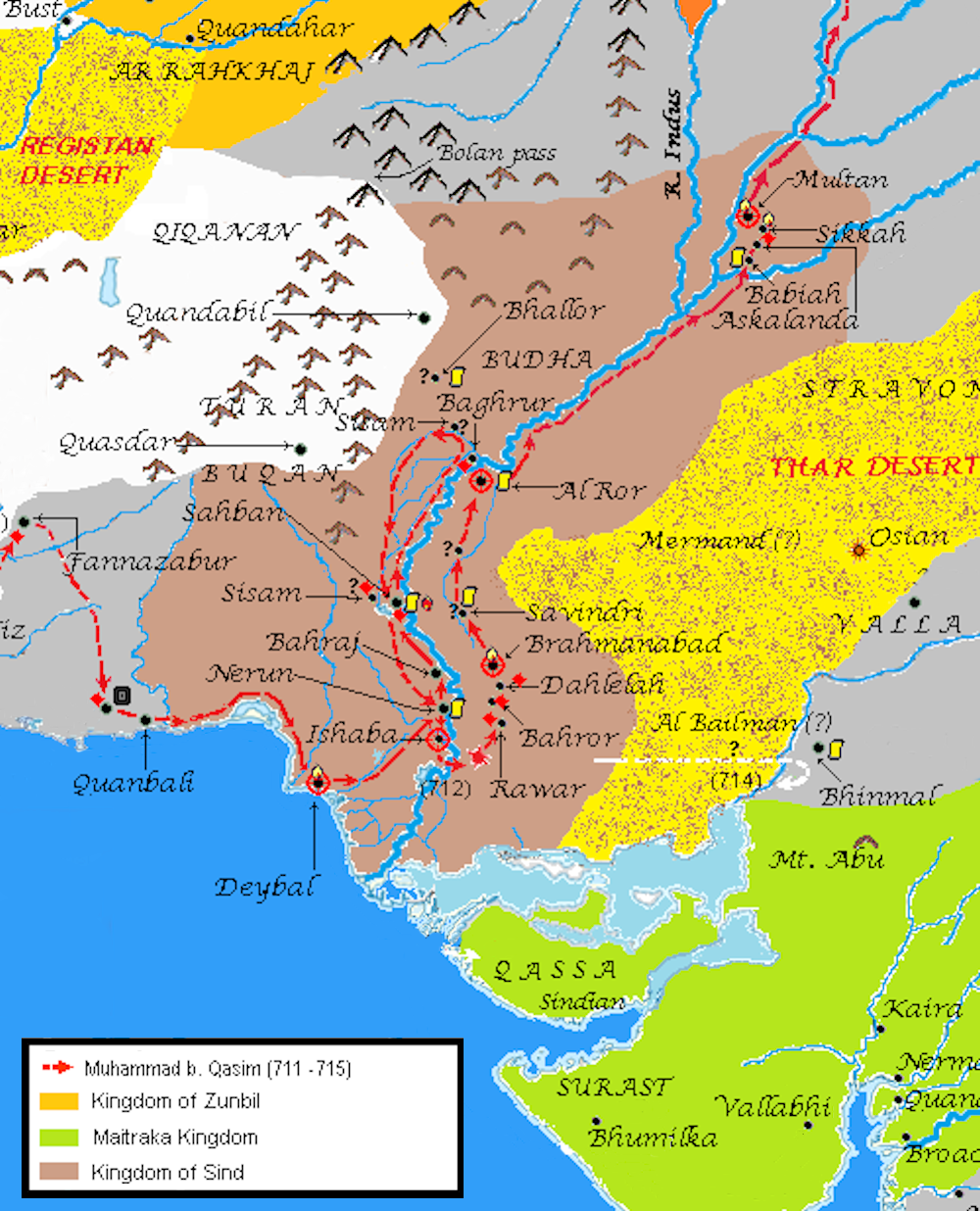
Muhammad ibn Qasim's Campaigns in Sindh. Desert areas (Thar Desert) Zunbils Kingdom of Sindh (c. 632– 712 CE) Kingdom of Valabhi (c.475–c.776 CE)

The dynasty was founded by a Brahmin named Chach, son of Silaij, after he married the widow of Rai Sahasi II and usurped the Buddhist Rai dynasty. His claim was further secured by the killing of Rai Sahasi II's brother.

The casus belli for the Umayyad invasion were pirates from Sindh, known as Bawarij, seizing tribute sent from the king of Serendib to the Umayyad caliph. For the campaign, caliph Abd al-Malik ibn Marwan granted a large army to the governor al-Hajjaj ibn Yusuf, but no attempt was made to annex Sindh due to the caliph's death. Under his son and successor al-Walid I, the general Muhammad ibn al-Qasim led the invasion of Sindh in 712.

During the invasion, local Buddhist clans who maintained loyalty to the previous Rai dynasty, such as the Zuṭṭ, allied themselves with the Umayyads against Raja Dahir. The last Hindu king of Sindh, Dahir was killed during the battle of Aror and Sindh was annexed into the Umayyad Caliphate. However, significant medieval Muslim chronicles such as the Chachnama, Zainul-Akhbar and Tarikh-i Bayhaqi refute this, as those have recorded battles between Jats and forces of Muhammad ibn al-Qasim. During the battle of Aror (Rohri) Muhammad ibn al-Qasim was met by Dahir's forces and the eastern Jats in battle.

== Rulers ==
The known rulers of the Brahmin dynasty are:

- Chach (r. c. 632 – 671)
- Chandar (r. c. 671 – 679)
- Dāhir (r. c. 679 – 712, from Alor)
  - Jaisimba (Jaisiah), the son of Dahir: After the death of Umayyad governor Hajjaj (r. 692–714) in 714 CE, Jaisimba reconquered the Brahmanabad during the reign of Umayyad caliph Sulayman ibn Abd al-Malik (r. 715–717). Jaisimba was later killed in a battle with Umayyad governor of Sindh, Junayd ibn Abd ar-Rahman al-Murri (r. 723 – 726 CE).
- Dahirsiya (r. c. 671 – 701, from Brahmanabad)

Under the Umayyad Caliphate:

- Hullishāh (r. c. 712 – 724)
- Shishah (r. 724–?)
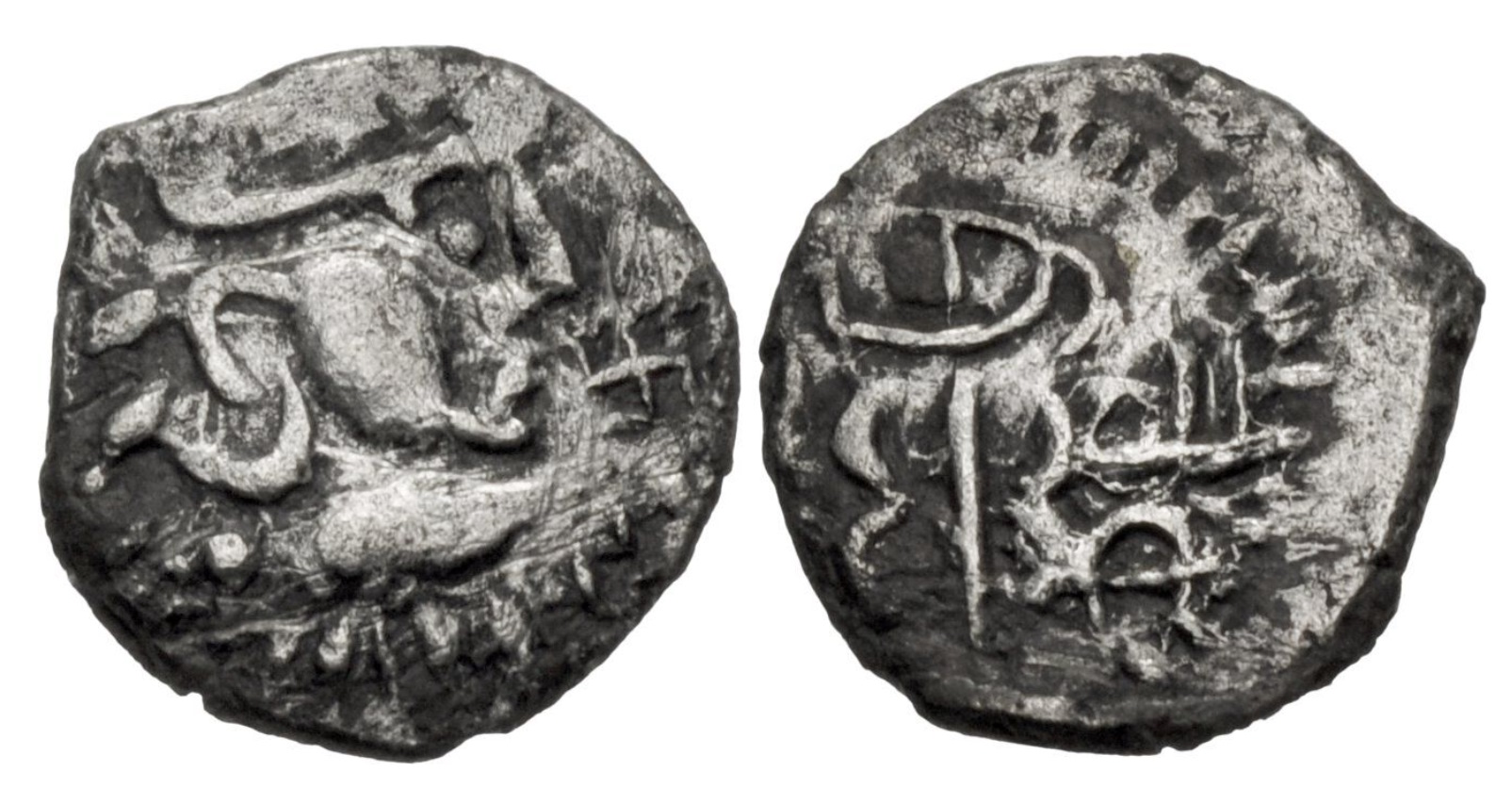
Chach of Alor. “Šri Yashaditya”. Circa 632–671. Sindh. Crowned head right; swastika to right. Large trident, šri yasha(ditya) around

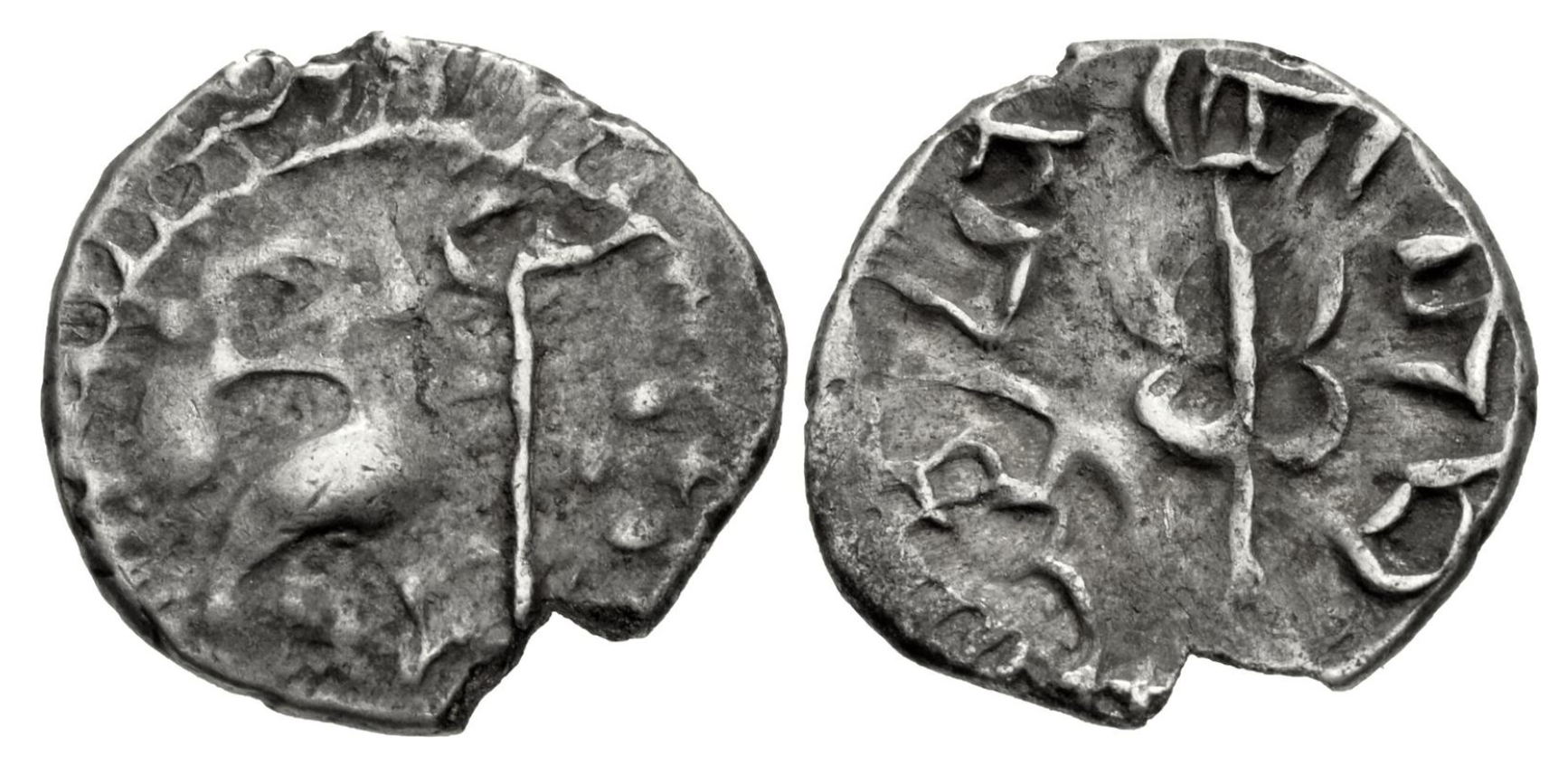
Sindh. Chach of Alor. Pracandendra. Circa 632–671 CE. AR Damma (11mm, 0.64 g, 2h). Obverse: Crowned head right; swastika to right. Reverse: Large trident

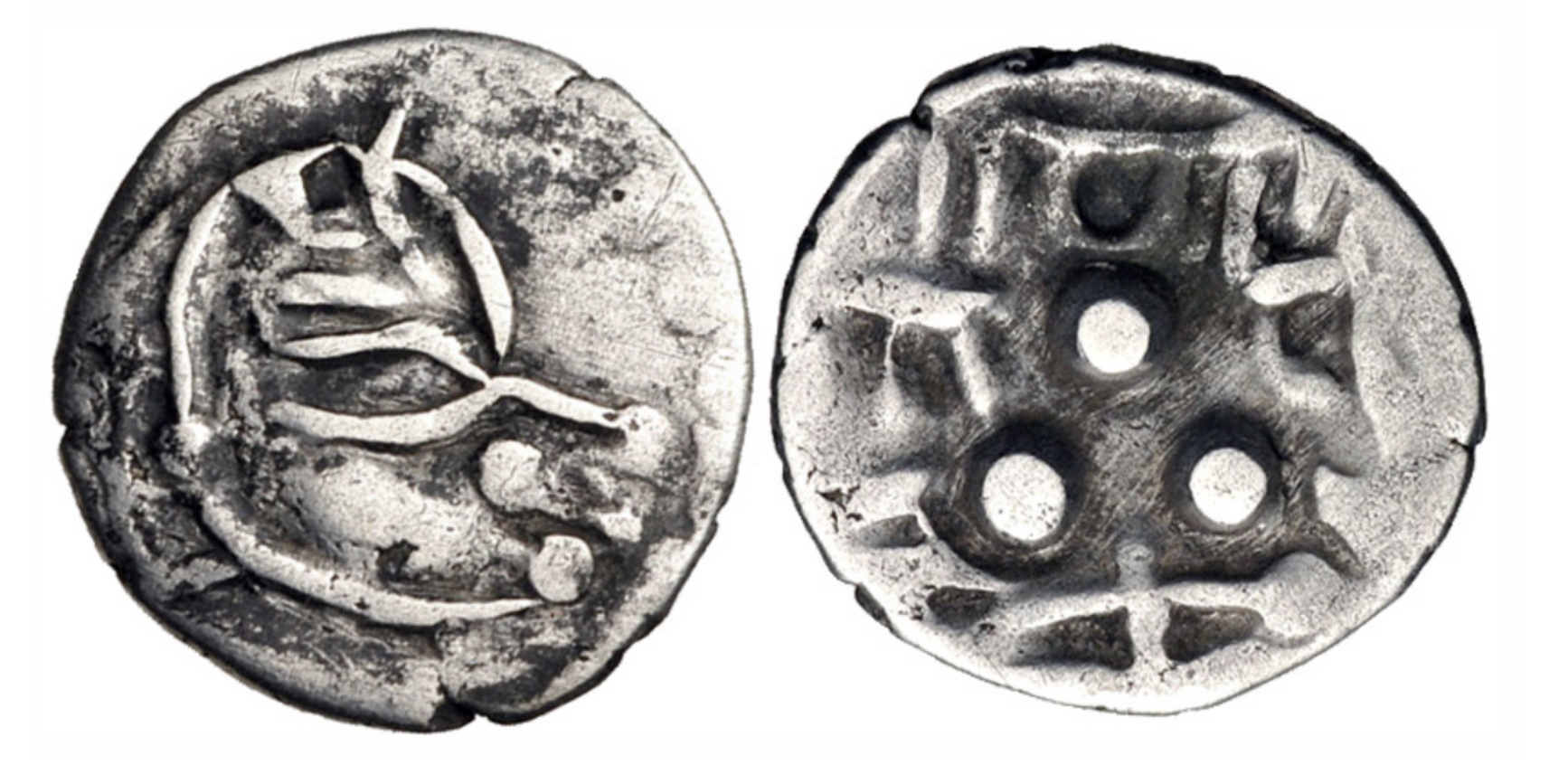
Sindh. Multan. ‘Śri Tapana’. Circa 675–700 CE. AR Damma (12mm, 0.62 g, 8h) Head right; śri in Brahmi on forehead Stylized fire altar surmounted by three pellets; tapan and rja in Brahmi around

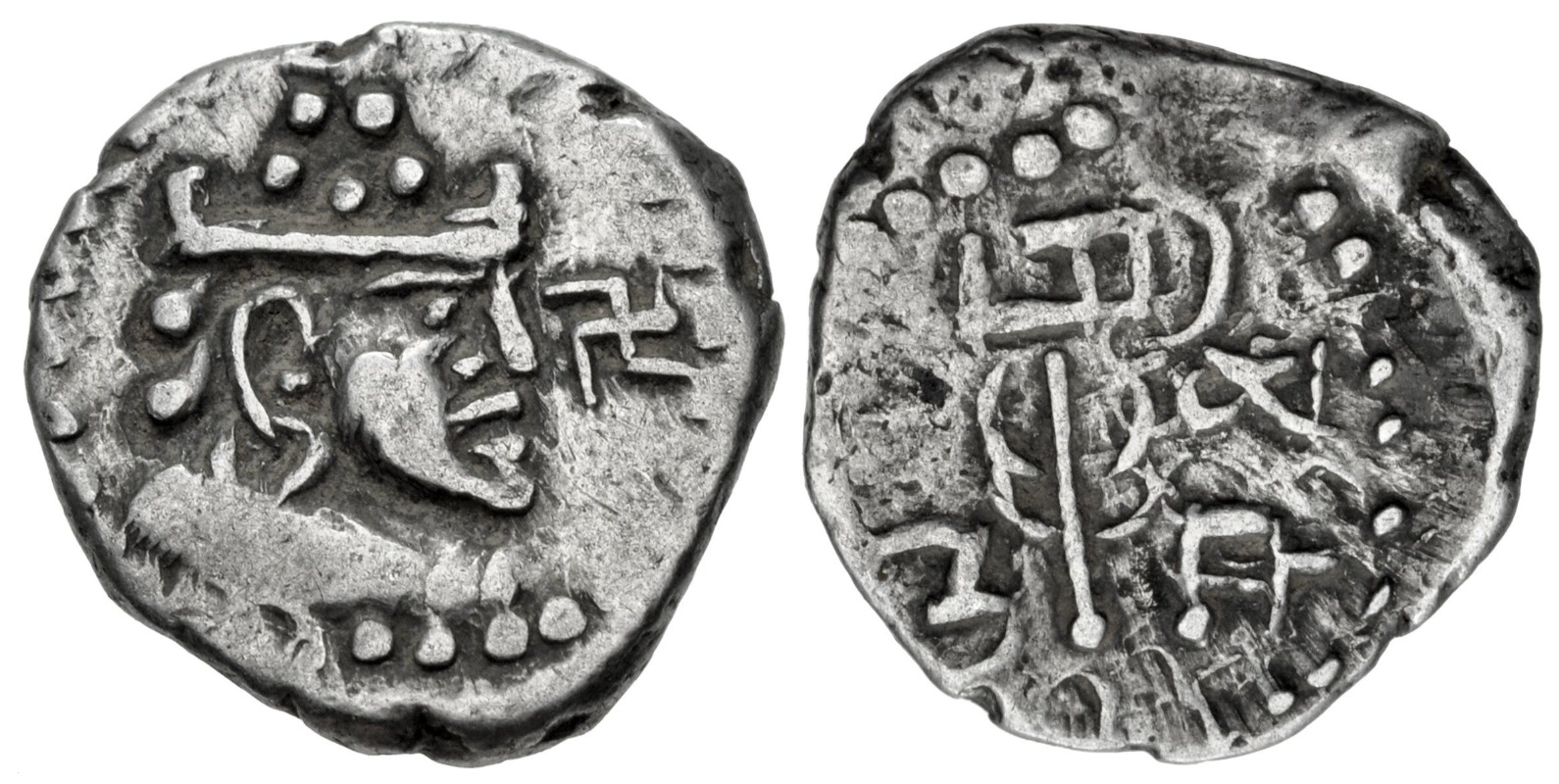
Sri Yashaditya. Chachas, Sindh, circa 679–712. Crowned head right, retrograde swastika to right. Large trident; śri yashaditya around

== See also ==
- Ali's Eastern Campaigns
- List of monarchs of Sindh

— Imperial house — Brahmin dynasty
Preceded by Rai dynasty	Monarchy; 632–712	Succeeded by Caliphate
