= Xylinepolis =

Xylinepolis or Xylenopolis (Greek: Ξυλίνη πόλις, meaning: wooden city/town) was a temporary military fortress (phrourion) in the naval base of Patala, founded in 325 BC by Alexander the Great. It is mentioned by Pliny the Elder. Alexander's admiral Nearchus stayed there for four months before his voyage.

William Woodthorpe Tarn argues that Pliny was mistaken in his reference to the town, and that Pliny's source merely mentioned an xyline polis, meaning a town made of wood. According to Tarn the town was therefore a pre-existing Indian town rather than one founded by Alexander.

== See also ==
- List of cities founded by Alexander the Great
