= Mansura, Sindh =

Historic capital of Sindh, Pakistan

Mansura
- برهمڻ آباد (Sindhi) or منصوره (Sindhi)
- Brahmanabad
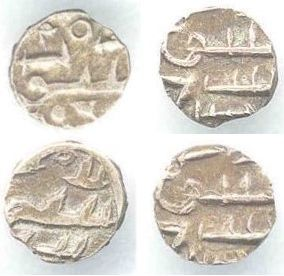
- Coins during the rule of Amirs of Sind, c. 257 -- 421 AH / c. 870 -- 1030 AD

- Location within Sindh Location within Pakistan
- 25°52′52″N 68°46′37″E
- Type: Settlement/Capital City
- Periods: Caliphal Period (Umayyad Period) (Abbasid Period)
- Cultures: Islamic Golden Age
- Location: Sanghar District, Sindh, Pakistan
- Part of: Umayyad Caliphate and Abbasid Caliphate in Sindh

Mansura (Arabic: المنصورة, romanized: al-manṣūra, lit. 'the triumphant [city]'; Sindhi: منصوره), referred to as Brahmanabad or Bahmanabad (Sindhi: برهمڻ آباد, romanized: barhamaṇabād, pronounced [ˈbəɾɦəmnɑːˈbɑːd̪]) in later centuries, was the historic capital of the caliphal province of Sindh, during the eighth century under the Umayyad Caliphate, and later the Abbasid Caliphate from the year 750 AD to 1006 AD. Founded as a central garrison by Umayyad forces in Sindh, the city transformed into a metropolis during the Abbasid era, surpassing the wealth of both Multan to the north and Debal to the south. Mansura was the first capital established by Muslims in South Asia after Muhammad bin Qasim seized the Brahmanabad territory. Built on the banks of the Indus River, Mansura was surrounded by fertile farmland. Ibn Hauqal mentioned the wealthy local merchants who wore Baghdad Costume and were of Sindhi-Arab origins; their houses were made of clay, baked bricks and plaster.

Mansura exported herbs and spices, textiles, ivory, metals and mirrors to Baghdad. The city also housed renowned educational institutions, which produced the first translation of the Quran in the Sindhi language. The translation was used throughout the Indus valley region. Mansura was home to notable figures such as Abu Mashar Sindhi, who is described by many historians and chroniclers as a pioneer in the compilation of Hadith; Abu Raja Sindhi lived in Baghdad and engaged in scientific and literary pursuits, including translating a large number of ancient books of South Asia on mathematics, astronomy, astrology, medicine, literature and ethics into Arabic. According to geologists, an earthquake struck both Debal and Mansura in the year 893 AD, and the city was later ruled by the Soomro Emirs. Mansura was sacked by the forces of Mahmud of Ghazni because the inhabitants feared his reputation and refused to open the gates. The city never recovered and its Soomro Emirs were deposed.

The city now lies 18 kilometres (11 mi) south-east of Shahdadpur and 75 kilometres (47 mi) north-east of Hyderabad.

== History ==
William Vincent identified the site of the historical town of Brahmanabad as being host to the city of Patala in antiquity. The chief of Patala, Mæris, is said to have approached Alexander to surrender his lands the Macedonians and afterwards was sent back to Patala to prepare the city to accommodate Alexander's armies. Only three days after this however, Mæris defected and fled with his subjects into the desert. When Alexander's armies arrived in the city, they found it uninhabited. Alexander's forces then pillaged the city after its capture. Alexander's first action after this was to ensure the return of Patala's former inhabitants, which he succeeded in doing after promising them protection. According to Bosworth, Xylinepolis was likely founded at Patala after this to serve as a Macedonian naval installation. Later, Patala was assigned to Porus as part of the Partition of Babylon.

The erstwhile name of this city was Brahmanabad, which was later renamed as Mansura by the Arab invaders. The Umayyad governor of Sind, Al-Hakam, founded a city called al-Mahfuza later called Brahminabad. Historical sources state that he found there were "no places in Sind where Muslims were safe", which indicates there was unrest and rebellions before his arrival. His deputy Al-Thaqafi founded Al-Masura "opposite Al-Mahfuza". Historian Blankinship believes that the former was a base for the Yamani troops of the Caliphate and the latter was for the Mudari troops. By the time of Al-Baladhuri, the old Brahamanabad was in ruins, and the new city itself was referred to by the name Brahmanabad.

The city was further developed by Khalid ibn Barmak (705–782), a member of the Iranian Barmakids family, during the Abbasid Caliphate. The city holds an important position in Muslim history as the first to be built by Arabs according to the principles of town-planning. Seventeen years later, lessons learned in Mansura were applied in Baghdad where there were once numerous Sindhi inspired buildings and monuments.

Mansura's history began under the Umayyad Caliphs, when Muslim Arabs attempted to conquer the frontier kingdoms of India ie Kabul, Zabul, and Sindh. In the early 8th Century, with the Kingdom of Sindh convulsed by internal strife, the Arabs seized their chance and renewed their attacks. Thereafter it was captured by Muhammad ibn Qasim, nephew of al-Hajjaj ibn Yusuf, the governor of Iraq and Khurasan with the army. Qasim's successors attempted to expand from Sindh into the Punjab and other regions. Al-Masudi ascribed the foundation of the city to Governor Mansur ibn Jamhur, the last Umayyad governor of Sindh. Umar ibn Abd al-Aziz, who belonged to the Banu Habar tribe, the clan of Banu Asad, was the first governor of al-Mansura. Under the Caliphate of al-Mansur, Khalid was appointed governor of Fars and, after helping obtain Prince Isa ibn Musa's renunciation of his succession to the caliphate in 765, became governor of Tabaristan. Around the same time, his son Yahya ibn Khalid, was appointed governor of Adharbayjan.

According to historians, Mansura was a beautiful town with vast orchards of mangoes and groves of date palms. Today the ruins of Mansura are spread over an area 4 miles (6.4 km) in circumference near the modern city of Shahdadpur. The most significant ruin found in Mansura is the large courtyard of a Jamia Masjid (mosque).

== Buddhist stupa ==
There is a stupa in Brahmanabad, described by some historians as a Buddhist stupa or shrine, surrounded by piles of red bricks and spanning an area of over four kilometers.

== Modern ruins ==
The city lies upon the open sandy plain amongst rolling heaps of brick debris, crisscrossed with the depressions of its original streets and surrounded by the ruins of its once massive walls and bastions. Shaped like a boot with the sole facing north-west and the leg stretching south-east, the whole area has a circumference of 5.75 miles (9.25 km). Apart from a considerable area towards the south-east end, the whole space is covered with billowing mounds of brick ruins. Nothing now stands above the surface, except in one place, where an unrecognizable tower-like core of brick masonry remains. There is a total absence of stone masonry of any kind, but lumps of charred wood dotted here and there indicate the former presence of woodwork. The cement used in the brickwork appears to have been mud which forms the greater mass of the present mounds.

As per historian Rahimdad Khan Molai Shedai, "Brahmanabad town was located within 4 miles area, where in the temple named Nu Wihar there was an idol of Buddha. In various history books on Sindh said temple was also written as Nu Bahar which is varied form of Nu Wihar. As Byblion temple priests were astrologers or fortune tellers like priests of Brahmanabad were also great astrologers. The staunch Brahaman king like Chach had to kneel before them and constrained to renovate the temple. The number of the priests in the town was around 1000."

In the initial excavation of the urban complex of Brahmanabad-Mansurah-Mahfuzah, A. P. Bellasis uncovered a seal bearing the Arabic inscription "Imam al-Baqir" which appear to belong to the fifth Shi'ite Imam Muhammad al-Baqir (677–733 AD).

== See also ==
- Jam Nawaz Ali
- Chach Nama
- Agham Lohana
- Lohana
- Samma Dynasty
- Khafif
- Debal
- Multan
- Abbasid Era
- Abu Mashar Sindhi
- Abu Raja Sindhi
- Ibn Hauqal
- Soomro Dynasty

== Bibliography ==
- Blankinship, Khalid Yahya (1994). The End of the Jihâd State: The Reign of Hishām ibn ʻAbd al-Malik and the Collapse of the Umayyads. Albany, New York: State University of New York Press. ISBN 978-0-7914-1827-7.
- Wink, André (1996) [first published 1990], Al-Hind: The Making of the Indo-Islamic World, Vol 1: Early Medieval India and the Expansion of Islam (Third ed.), Brill, ISBN 0391041738
