= Abu Raja Sindhi =

Sindhi Muslim scholar

Abu Raja Al-Sindi ابو راجه السندي

Personal life
- Born: Sindh, Abbasid Caliphate
- Died: 321 AH (933 AD), 10th century Abbasid Caliphate
- Era: Islamic Golden Age
- Region: Abbasid Caliphate
- Notable work: Translated the Quran into Sindhi language
- Occupation: Scholar of Islam

Religious life
- Religion: Islam
- Creed: Sunni

Abu Raja Al-Sindi (Arabic: ابو راجه السندي) (d. 321 AH/d. 10th century AD) was an Arabic scholar of Sindhi origin in what is now Pakistan. He specialised in the study of Quran, Hadith and Arab literature. He was also a teacher of Arab scholars, administrators and travellers to Sindh.
