= Debal =

Ancient port city in Sindh, Pakistan

Debal (also called Daybul, Daibul or Dēwal) was a commercial town and an ancient port in Sindh, now a province of Pakistan.

The exact location of the town has been difficult to determine. The proposed identifications with Karachi, Thatta, and Lahari Bandar remain unsubstantiated.

The town was mostly inhabited by people of the Med tribe. During Muqaddasī's visit, the merchants spoke the Sindhi and Arabic languages.

== Etymology ==
In Arabic history books, most notably in the early eighth century accounts of the arrival of Islam in the Indian subcontinent, it was documented as Daybul (Dīwal ~ Dībal ديبل). One view is that the name was derived from Devalaya, meaning abode of God in Sanskrit.

According to the Chach Nama, the name Dēbal is derived from Dēwal, meaning 'temple'. The reason, it says, is because it was the site of a renowned temple.

== History ==
According to modern archaeologists, Debal was founded in the first century CE, and soon became the most important trading city in Sindh. The port city was home to thousands of Sindhi sailors including the Bawarij. Ibn Hawqal, a tenth-century writer, geographer and chronicler, mentions huts of the city and the dry arid land surrounding the city that supported little agriculture. He mentions how efficiently the inhabitants of the city maintained fishing vessels and trade. The Abbasids were the first to build large stone structures including a city wall and a citadel. An earthquake in 893 AD reportedly destroyed the port city of Debal.

Debal was the first city to be stormed by Muhammad bin Qasim. The ninth century Muslim historian, Al-Baladhuri, who wrote the comprehensive account of early Islamic intrusions into India, recorded that a section of population was killed in a massacre that lasted three days. Qasim then marked out a quarter of the town for the Muhammadan garrison, after the Hindu leaders built a temple and left behind four thousand men.

As late as 1221, Debal appears to have remained an important port city; according to the Jahan-kusha describes that Jalal al-Din Mangburni approached the city that year, and its ruler Hasrar fled, allowing him to enter the city unopposed. However, the city must have gone into decline shortly thereafter – the Indus changed course around that time, and the site was eventually abandoned. By the early 1300s, Debal is completely absent from Ibn Battuta’s description of Sindh. Its role as Sindh’s main commercial port was transferred to the newer city of Lahari Bandar.

Debal and the Manora Island were visited by Ottoman admiral Seydi Ali Reis (1498–1563) and mentioned in his book Mir'ât ül Memâlik in 1554. In 1568 Debal was attacked by the Portuguese Admiral Fernão Mendes Pinto (1509 – 1583) in an attempt to capture or destroy the Ottoman vessels anchored there. Fernão Mendes Pinto also claims that Sindhi sailors joined the Ottoman admiral Kurtoğlu Hızır Reis on his voyage to Aceh. Debal was also visited by British travel writers such as Thomas Postans and John Elliott. According to Eliot, who is noted for his vivid account on the city of Thatta, parts of the city of Karachi and the island of Manora at the port of Karachi constituted the city of Debal.

== Location ==
Despite its historical importance, the exact location of Debal is uncertain. Early geographers only provided a vague description of its location, although the maps by Ibn Hawqal and Istakhri depict it as being on the west bank of the Indus, right at the shore. Firishta (c. 1600) wrote that Debal is the same place as Thatta, and this claim was then repeated by later authors. Mir Ma'sum went a step further and claimed that Debal was both Thatta and Lahari Bandar. Most early British authors similarly identified Debal with Thatta; for example, Richard Francis Burton wrote that Thatta was only ever called Debal in Arabic and Persian, and shawls made in Thatta were known by the name shal-i Debali.

Other writers, such as H. M. Elliot (1867), have preferred Karachi as the location of Debal. Elliot in particular had "little doubt" in this identification and suggested that the eponymous temple of Debal was probably on Manora Island. However, Malcolm Robert Haig (1894) criticized this identification based on a faulty translation of al-Baladhuri's Futuh al-Buldan into French by Joseph Toussaint Reinaud, which translates the Arabic خور الديبل khawr al-Daybul, "estuary/creek of Debal", as "la baie de Debal", or "the bay of Debal". Haig himself preferred the ruins of Kakar Bukera, downstream from Thatta on the Baghar branch of the Indus; local tradition holds that the site was once a thriving commercial port.

Another proposed identification is the site of Banbhore. N. B. Baluch (1952) argued for this interpretation on philological grounds, but lacked archaeological evidence to back it up. However, systematic excavations took place between September 1958 and April 1965 under the direction of F. A. Khan, leading to the discovery of 14 Kufic inscriptions on the collapsed northern wall of Banbhore's congregational mosque. A study of these inscriptions by Muhammad Abdul Ghafur (1966) concluded strongly in favour of identifying Debal with Banbhore, and as of 2012 his conclusion has remained unchallenged.

Meanwhile, Syed Shakir Ali Shah (1996) has also proposed that both Debal and Lahari Bandar were at Juna Shah Bandar (aka Jaki Bandar, in Mirpur Sakro taluka of Thatta district at 24°37′ N, 67°22′ E). Excavation here revealed the presence of an earlier fort beneath the currently visible ruins.

== See also ==
- Banbhore
- Karachi
- Muhammad ibn Qasim
- Lahari Bandar
