= Bawarij =

Sindhi pirates

Bawarij (Sindhi: باوارج; sing. Sindhi: برجا) were pirates from Sindh, who were named for their distinctive barja warships (which means "large vessels of war" in Arabic) and were active between 251 and 865 CE. They looted Arab shipping bound for the Indian subcontinent and China, but entirely converted to Islam during the rule of the Samma dynasty in Sindh (1335 – 1520). They are mentioned by al-Maʿsūdī as frequenting the pirate den at Socotra, and other scholars describes them as pirates and sailors of Sindh. Their frequent piracy and the incident in which they looted two treasure ships coming from Ceylon became the casus belli for the Umayyad conquest of Sindh.

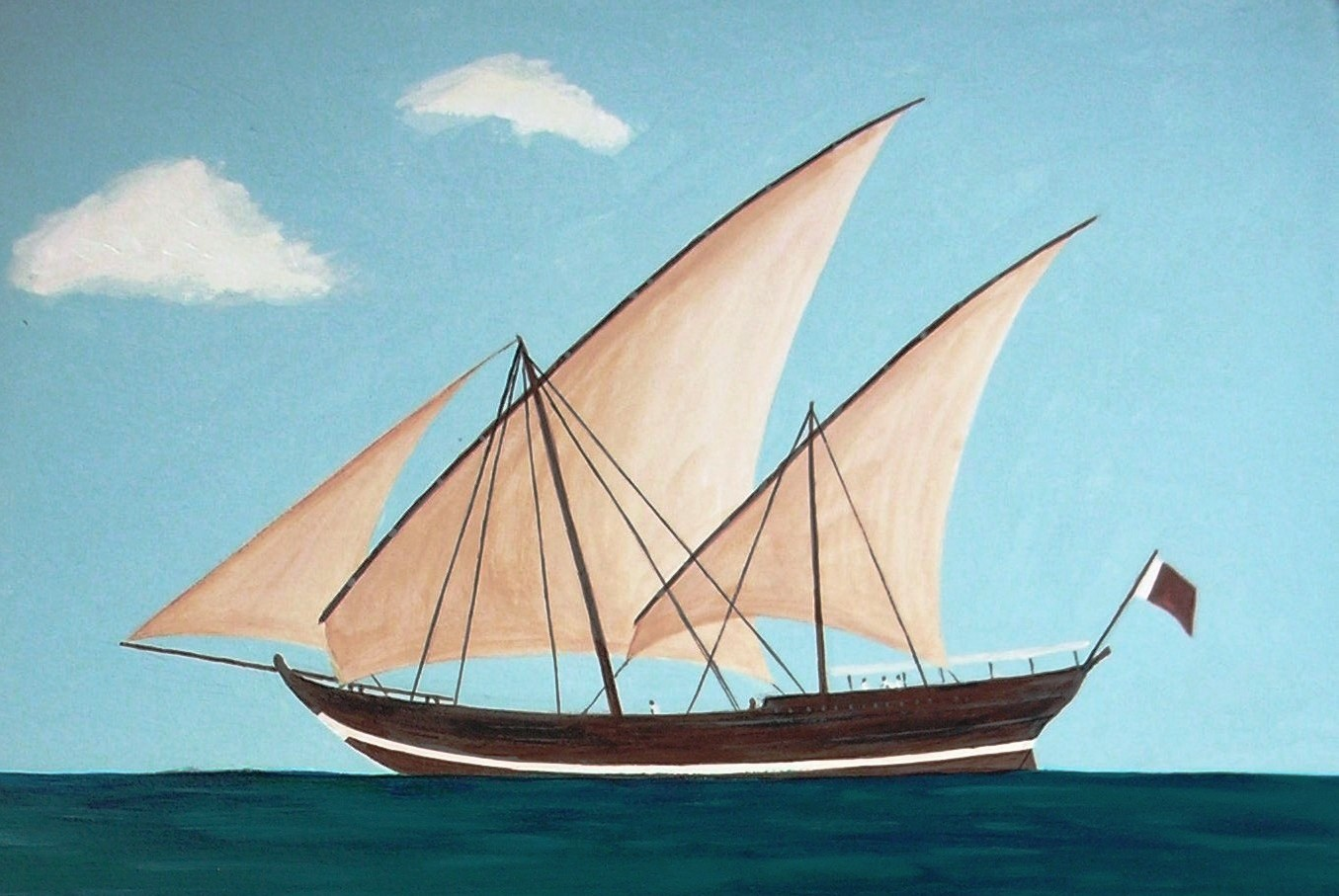
Bawarij gained their name from Barija, a type of Dhow.

Ibn Battuta describes their ships as having fifty rowers and fifty men-at-arms, and wooden roofs to protect against arrows and stones. Tabari describes them in an attack upon Basra in 866 CE as having one pilot (istiyam), three fire-throwers (naffatun), a baker, a carpenter and thirty-nine rowers and fighters making up a complement of forty-five. These ships were unsuited for warlike maneuvers and lacked the sleek prows or ramming capabilities of other contemporary naval units, but were intended to provide for hand-to-hand battles for crew upon boarding.

== History ==
In the ninth century, maritime raids into the Arabian Sea and the Persian Gulf became a serious problem. On 27 March 865 CE, ten bawarij deep-water ships sailed from al-Basrah. Each of these ten vessels was crewed by a ship's captain, three sailors who hurled fire onto enemy ships, a carpenter, a baker, and thirty-nine rowers and warriors. As a result, each vessel had a total crew of forty-five individuals. That night, the bawarij pirates arrived at the island facing the palace of ibn Tahir, and later they reached the Shammasiyyah area.

The bawarij pirates on the ships opened fire on the Turks, forcing them to move their camp from the low-lying area of al-Shammasiyyah to Abu Ja'far al-Mansur's garden near the bridge. It then became clear to the Turks that they had to retreat even higher, to a location above their previous camp, in order to escape the fire being thrown at them.

Imam Ghassan had received a letter from Munir, an Ibadi missionary from Basra. In the letter, Munir lamented the attacks in the Indian Ocean and the Persian Gulf carried out by the bawarij pirates from India. In particular, Munir also strongly condemned the killing of fifty people by the bawarij during their attack. Imam Ghassan moved to Sohar for 5 years in response to the problem caused by the pirates. In his stay in Sohar, he formed the first naval force of Oman in order to protect the coastal communities and ships of Oman against attacks from Sindhi pirate raiders called al-bawārij or bawarijs.

== See also ==
- History of Sindh
