= Aror University Sukkur =

University in Pakistan

Aror University of Art, Architecture, Design and Heritage
- اروڑ يونيورسٹى آف آرٹ، آركيٹكچر ڈيزائن اينڈ ہيريٹج
- Aror University Logo
- Other name: AUA2DH
- Type: Public sector (Government) University
- Established: 7 July 2020 (As Aror University); April 2013 (As Sindh College of Arts & Design)
- Accreditation: HEC, PEC, PCATP
- Chancellor: Chief Minister of Sindh
- Vice-Chancellor: Zahid Hussain Khand
- Students: 600+
- Location: Rohri RCW Bypass N-5, Sukkur, Sindh, 65170, Pakistan; 27°39′50″N 68°55′27.2″E
- Campus: Urban, 60 acres (24 ha)
- Website: https://aror.edu.pk/

The Aror University of Art, Architecture, Design and Heritage (اروڑ يونيوؤسٹى آف آرٹ، آركيٹكچر، ڈيزائن اينڈ هيريٹج) is public sector university established near Sukkur at Rohri bypass N-5 National Highway in the vicinity of ancient historical town of Aror, once the capital of Sindh. The university offer the graduate, postgraduate and advance studies in the field of architecture, environmental science, textile design, fashion design, civil engineering, media sciences, archaeology, photography, interior design, communication design, ceramics and other disciplines.

The university was established by the government of Sindh through the act of parliament on Monday 15 June 2020 through the Government Bill passed by the Sindh Assembly. First it was established as Sindh College of Arts & Design, under the Quaid-e-Awam University of Engineering, Science & Technology.

In April 2018, the Bill of Aror University of Art, Architecture, Design and Heritage was moved as private members bill by Member Parliament Syed Awais Qadir Shah of PPP to upgrade the college to full-fledged University. That bill was passed by the Sindh Assembly and was sent to the Governor of Sindh. The Sindh governor returned the bill with the observation to ensure participation of the HEC. The University & Boards Department in the light of the observations of the Governor prepared the draft and on the instructions of the Chief Minister placed it before the cabinet. The cabinet approved it and sent the bill to the Sindh Assembly. The Provincial Assembly of Sindh in its sitting held on Thursday, 2 May 2019 referred the Bill, to the Standing Committee on Higher, Technical Education and Research with the terms of reference to examine the bill and report back to the Assembly. After getting report of the Standing Committee, finally The Aror University of Art, Architecture, Design and Heritage, Sukkur, Bill, 2019 was passed along with seven other bills when the Sindh Assembly unanimously passed eight government bills on Monday 15 June 2020, The bill was assented to by the honorable Governor of Sindh on 7 July 2020 and was published as Provincial Assembly of Sindh Notification No. PAS/LEGIS.B -11/2019, Dated: 15 July 2020 in the Sindh Government Gazette as SINDH ACT NO. IX OF 2020.

== Faculties ==
The university includes the following Faculties.

- Faculty of Architecture, Sciences, Engineering and Town Planning (FATP)
- Faculty of Design (FoD)
- Faculty of Emerging Sciences and Technology (FEST)
- Faculty of Fine Arts
- Faculty of Heritage (FoH)

== Admissions ==
The University currently offer the following undergraduate programs:

- Bachelor of Architecture (B.Arch.)
- BS Civil Engineering
- BS Environmental Science
- BS Visual Arts
- BS Digital Art
- BS Fashion Design
- BS Textile Design
- BS History
- BS Archaeology
- BS Artificial Intelligence
- BS Multimedia & Gaming
- BS Cyber Security

== See also ==
- List of educational institutions in Sukkur
- Sukkur
- Begum Nusrat Bhutto Women University
