= Begum Nusrat Bhutto Women University =

University in Sindh, Pakistan

Coordinates: 27°39′50″N 68°55′27.2″E

Begum Nusrat Bhutto (BNB) Women University
- بيگم نصرت بهٹو ويمن يونيورسٹى
- Insignia of BNB Women University
- Type: Public University
- Established: 23 October 2020
- Chancellor: Governor of Sindh
- Vice-Chancellor: Tehmina Mangan
- Location: Sukkur, Rohri bypass N-5, Sindh, Pakistan
- Campus: 50 acres (20 ha), urban
- Colours
- Affiliations: HEC
- Website: bnbwu.edu.pk info@bnbwu.edu.pk

Begum Nusrat Bhutto Women University (BNBWU) is a public-sector higher education institution located in Sukkur, Sindh, Pakistan. It is named in honor of Begum Nusrat Bhutto, a prominent political figure, former First Lady of Pakistan, and an advocate of women’s rights, who played a vital role in the country’s socio-political landscape. Although the legal establishment came in 2018, the university was inaugurated on 23 October 2020 by Sindh’s Chief Minister Murad Ali Shah.

First ever public sector Women University in the Upper Sindh was established at Rohri, in the name of Begum Nusrat Bhutto by the government of Sindh through the act of parliament. Begum Nusrat Bhutto (BNB) Women University ( بیگم نصرت بھثو ويمن يونيورسٹى) is located at the National Highway N-5 bypassing Rohri city of Sukkur District. It is exclusively for women, having the arts, science, business, and computer science faculties. Initially the departments of Education, English, mass communication, business, Mathematics and Biological and Human Sciences have started their teaching programmes. The construction work of the university is looked after by the project director appointed by Government of Sindh and is carried out by M/s Global Engineering Services Rawalpindi, Currently the construction work is at its full swing.

== History ==
Prime Minister of Pakistan Syed Yousaf Raza Gillani announced the establishment of first ever public sector Women University during his visit to Sukkur on January 11, 2009. Sindh government decided to name the Women University after former First Lady of Pakistan, so a bill in this regard was drafted and forwarded to Law department for establishing "Begum Nusrat Bhutto Women University" at Sukkur. Commissioner Sukkur Division was assigned officially to prepare master plan for the establishment of Women University at Sukkur adjacent to Aror University of Art, Architecture, Design & Heritage site.

Finally The Sindh Assembly passed the bill moved by Provincial Minister for Law, the House passed the Begum Nusrat Bhutto Women University Sukkur Bill, 2018 on Thursday April 19, 2018, providing for the way for establishment of women university in district Sukkur.

== Faculties ==
The university includes the following faculties.

- (i) Faculty of Natural Sciences
- (ii) Faculty of Commerce, Economics, and Management Sciences
- (iii) Faculty of Cultural and Social Sciences
- (iv) Faculty of Education, Literacy and Learning
- (v) Faculty of Family and Community Sciences
- (vi) Faculty of Law
- (vii) Faculty of Journalism and Communication
- (viii) Faculty of Engineering and Technology
- (ix) Faculty of Theology and Religious affairs
- (x) Faculty of Pharmacy; and
- (xi) Such other faculties as may be prescribed by the Statute

== Admissions ==
The HEC give accreditation to BNB Women University Sukkur and allow to admit 50 female students each in five faculties, admission process have started for four year graduation program in following disciplines through centralized entry test to be held in centers at Karachi, Hyderabad and Sukkur on 31 October 2020.

- BS Computer Science
- BBA (HRM/Finance/Marketing)
- BS Management & Technology
- BS Mathematics
- BS English
- BS Management Sciences
- B.Ed.
- Doctor of Physiotherapy (DPT)
- BS Biotechnology
- BS Chemistry
- BS Genetics
- BS Physics
- MS Education

== See also ==
- List of educational institutions in Sukkur
- Aror University Sukkur
- Begum Nusrat Bhutto
- Begum Nusrat Bhutto Airport
