= Bbonhel Bala =

Populated place in Sindh, Pakistan

Coordinates: 27°34′30″N 069°04′00″E

Bbonhel Bala is a populated place in Khairpur District, Sindh, Pakistan.

== See also ==
- Aror
- Sukkur
