= Begum Nusrat Bhutto International Airport =

Airport in Pakistan

Begum Nusrat Bhutto International Airport Sukkur
- IATA: SKZ; ICAO: OPSK

Summary
- Airport type: Military/Public
- Operator: Pakistan Airports Authority
- Serves: Sukkur, Shikarpur, Jacobabad, Sibi, Khairpur, Ghotki
- Location: Sukkur-65200
- Opened: 1942
- Elevation AMSL: 196 ft (60 m)
- Coordinates: 27°43′19″N 068°47′30″E

Map
- Interactive map of Begum Nusrat Bhutto International Airport Sukkur

Runways
Direction	Length		Surface
Direction	ft	m	Surface
14/32	9,000	2,743	Bitumen

Statistics (2017-18)
- Passengers: 114,081
- Passenger change: ▲6.5%
- Aircraft movements: 2,461

Sukkur Airport (IATA: SKZ, ICAO: OPSK), also known as Begum Nusrat Bhutto International Airport Sukkur, is an International airport located about 8 km (5.0 mi) from the centre of Sukkur city, and serves Sukkur and its surrounding areas; Khairpur, Jacobabad, Sibi and Shikarpur.

Sukkur International Airport is the second main operational airport in Sindh, after Jinnah International Airport, Karachi. The paved runway is about 2,700 metres long. It also handles international flights, especially in time of emergencies and flights diversions from other airports due to bad weather conditions.

It is the main alternative to Karachi's Jinnah International Airport, with a distance of about 350 km (220 mi), well under an hour's flight time by turboprop aircraft, and less than 35 minutes by jet.

== History ==
It was built in 1942 and was originally known as Sukkur Aerodrome, and was used as a military airfield by the British Raj. The airport was renamed as Sukkur Airport in 1980. On 26 January 2012, the Provincial Assembly of Sindh unanimously passed a resolution to name the airport after Nusrat Bhutto (مادرجمہوریت، بیگم نصرت بھثو), a former First Lady of Pakistan in the 1970s.

During Hajj season every year, Hajj flights operate from Sukkur to Jeddah and Medina in the Kingdom of Saudi Arabia and back. The first Hajj flight from the Begum Nusrat Bhutto Airport, Sukkur, left for Jeddah on 6 August 2016. The Hajj flight operation continued until 13 August 2016.

In September 2022, the Pakistan Civil Aviation Authority assigned the upgrade and expansion project of the Begum Nusrat Bhutto Airport Sukkur to the National Engineering Services Pakistan. According to the plan, the airport is planned to be turned into an international airport for wide-body aircraft with all allied facilities. The renovation project includes extension of the runway and the taxiway, reconstruction of the apron and terminal building, along with other related facilities.

== International status ==
In September 2022, the Civil Aviation Authority (CAA) accelerated the process of granting international status to Begum Nusrat Bhutto Airport (BNBA) in Sukkur.

After getting international status, it will be the second international airport in Sindh.

In 2025, the airport will be upgrade to international status and planning to operate two-weekly flights between Sukkur and Jeddah

== See also ==
- Begum Nusrat Bhutto
- List of airports in Pakistan
- Airlines of Pakistan
- Begum Nusrat Bhutto Women University
- Transport in Pakistan
- Pakistan Civil Aviation Authority
