= Rohri Hills =

- Location within Sindh Location within Pakistan

Geography
- Location: Sindh, Pakistan
- Range coordinates: 27°27′18″N 68°55′53″E

Geology
- Rock age: Middle Eocene / Early Oligocene
- Mountain type: Sedimentary

The Rohri Hills in Upper Sindh, Pakistan are scarped rocks of limestone running southeast of Rohri between the Indus River in the west and the Nara River in the east. The hills are about 40 kilometres (25 miles) long and 16 kilometres (9.9 miles) wide. These hills are home to a large number of archaeological sites. Flint artifacts of the Paleolithic period have been discovered here.

== See also ==
- Aror
- Kot Diji
