= Nusrat Bhutto =

First Lady of Pakistan from 1971 to 1977

Begum Nusrat Bhutto
- ‌نصرت بوتو (Persian) نُصرت بُھٹّو (Urdu)
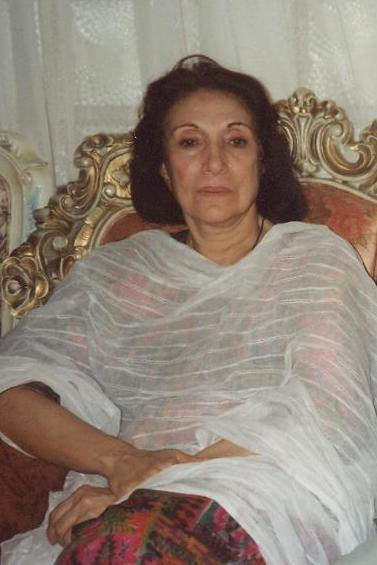
- Nusrat Bhutto

1st Senior Minister of Pakistan
- In office 31 March 1989 – 6 August 1990
- Prime Minister: Benazir Bhutto
- Preceded by: Zulfikar Ali Bhutto
- Succeeded by: Rao Sikandar Iqbal

2nd Chairperson of Pakistan Peoples Party
- In office 4 April 1979 – 10 January 1984
- Preceded by: Zulfikar Ali Bhutto
- Succeeded by: Benazir Bhutto

Spouse of the Prime Minister of Pakistan
- In office 14 August 1973 – 5 July 1977
- Prime Minister: Zulfikar Ali Bhutto
- Preceded by: Mrs. Nurul Amin
- Succeeded by: Begum Junejo

First Lady of Pakistan
- In office 20 December 1971 – 14 August 1973
- President: Zulfikar Ali Bhutto
- Preceded by: Mrs. Ayub Khan
- Succeeded by: Shafiq Zia

Personal details
- Born: Nusrat Ispahani; 23 March 1929 Isfahan, Pahlavi Iran
- Died: 23 October 2011 (aged 82) Dubai, Emirate of Dubai, United Arab Emirates
- Cause of death: Alzheimer's disease
- Resting place: Bhutto family mausoleum
- Party: Pakistan People's Party
- Spouse: Zulfikar Ali Bhutto (m. 1951; died 1979)
- Children: Benazir Bhutto; Murtaza Bhutto; Sanam Bhutto; Shahnawaz Bhutto
- Relatives: See Bhutto family
- Education: University of Karachi
- Profession: Politician
- Nickname: Mādar-e-Jamhūriyat ("Mother of Democracy")

Begum Nusrat Bhutto (Note: Persian: ‌نصرت بوتو; Sindhi: نصرت ڀٽو; Urdu: نُصرت بُھٹّو) (née Ispahani; (Note: Persian: اسپهانی) 23 March 1929 – 23 October 2011) was an Iranian-Pakistani public figure and stateswoman who served as the First Lady of Pakistan from 1971 to 1977 as the wife of Zulfikar Ali Bhutto, who served as the country's president and prime minister. She led the Pakistan Peoples Party (PPP) from her husband's execution in 1979 to 1984 when their daughter Benazir Bhutto succeeded her. She also served as the first Senior Minister of Pakistan from 1988 to 1990 under Benazir's government.

She was born in Isfahan, Iran to a wealthy merchant family of Kurdish heritage and her family had settled in Bombay before moving to Karachi after the Partition of British India. Ispahani joined a paramilitary women's force in 1950, but left a year later when she married Zulfikar Ali Bhutto. She moved to Oxfordshire in England with her husband who then was pursuing his legal education. She returned to Pakistan alongside Bhutto who went on to serve as the Foreign Minister. After her husband founded the Pakistan Peoples Party, Ispahani worked to lead the party's women's wing. After Bhutto was elected as the President in 1971, Ispahani became the First Lady of Pakistan and remained so until her husband's removal in 1977. Her daughter, Benazir Bhutto immediately succeeded her husband as the leader of the Pakistan Peoples party. While under house arrest, Ispahani fought an unsuccessful legal battle to prevent her husband's execution. After Bhutto's execution, Ispahani, along with her children, went into exile to London, from where in 1981 she co-founded the Movement for the Restoration of Democracy, a non-violent opposition to Zia's regime.

Ispahani returned to Pakistan after her daughter Benazir made a comeback in 1986. After the People's Party's victory in 1988, she joined Benazir's cabinet as a minister without portfolio while representing Larkana District in the National Assembly. She remained in the cabinet until Benazir's government was dismissed in 1990. Afterwards, during a family dispute between her son, Murtaza, and her daughter, Benazir, Ispahani favored Murtaza leading Benazir to sack Ispahani as the party leader. Ispahani stopped talking to the media and refrained from political engagements after the assassination of her son Murtaza in 1996 during a police encounter, during her daughter's second government.

Ispahani moved to Dubai in 1996, suffering from Alzheimer's disease, she was kept out of public's eye by Benazir until her demise on 23 October 2011. In Pakistan, Ispahani is remembered for her contribution to empowerment of women in Pakistan and for advocating for democracy in Pakistan, for which she is dubbed as Mādar-e-Jamhūriyat (English "Mother of Democracy"), a title she was honored with by the parliament following her death.

== Early life ==
Nusrat Ispahani was born on 23 March 1929 in Isfahan, Pahlavi Iran. Her father was a businessman who came from the wealthy Iranian Shia Hariri family in Isfahan. Her mother was from Kurdistan province, Pahlavi Iran. Shortly after her birth, the family moved to British India, where they initially lived in Bombay and then moved to Karachi before the Partition of British India and the creation of Pakistan in 1947. She grew up with Iranian traditions at her home but adapted to Indian Muslim culture outside.

After emigrating to British India, Nusrat attended the University of Karachi where she obtained a Bachelor of Arts (B.A.) in Humanities in 1950.

== Political life ==
As first lady from 1971 to 1977, Nusrat Bhutto functioned as a political worker and accompanied her husband on a number of overseas visits. In 1979, after the trial and execution of her husband, she succeeded her husband as leader of the Pakistan Peoples Party as chairman for life. She led the PPP's campaign against General Muhammad Zia-ul-Haq's regime. Alongside her daughter Benazir Bhutto, she was arrested numerous times and placed under house arrest and in prison in Sihala. Nusrat Bhutto was attacked by police with batons while attending a cricket match at Gaddafi Stadium in Lahore, when the crowd began to raise pro Bhutto slogans. In 1982, ill with cancer, she was given permission to leave the country by the military government of General Zia-ul-Haq for medical treatment in London at which point her daughter, Benazir Bhutto, became acting leader of the party, and, by 1984, the party chairman.

After returning to Pakistan in the late 1980s, she served two terms as a Member of Parliament to the National Assembly from the family constituency of Larkana, Sindh. During the administrations of her daughter Benazir, she became a cabinet minister and Senior Federal Minister. In the 1990s, she and Benazir became estranged when Nusrat took the side of her son Murtaza during a family dispute but were later reconciled after Murtaza's murder. She lived the last few years of her life with her daughter's family in Dubai, United Arab Emirates and later suffered from the combined effects of a stroke and Alzheimer's disease.

== Personal life, illness and death ==
Besides her native Persian, Bhutto was fluent in English, Urdu and Sindhi. Nusrat met Zulfikar Ali Bhutto in Karachi where they later got married on 8 September 1951. She was Zulfikar Ali Bhutto's second wife, and they had four children together: Benazir, Murtaza, Sanam and Shahnawaz. With the exception of Sanam, she outlived her children. Benazir's widower and Nusrat's son-in-law Asif Ali Zardari was the President of Pakistan from 9 September 2008 to 8 September 2013 and from March 2024 to the present.

Bhutto was suspected of cancer in 1982, and hence, allowed to leave Pakistan for medical treatment. While she continued her political activities from outside the country, she handed over the reigns of the party to her daughter Benazir. Three years later, her youngest son, Shahnawaz was found dead at Cannes. She withdrew from public life particularly after her son Murtaza's death in 1996, which some suggest coincides with her onset of Alzheimer's disease. At the time of her daughter Benazir's assassination, the disease was so advanced that she could not comprehend the killing.

Bhutto used a ventilator during her last days. She died at the age of 82 in the Iranian Hospital Dubai on 23 October 2011. Her son-in-law, then Pakistani President Asif Ali Zardari, cut short his official trip to Jordan to escort her body from Dubai to Pakistan. Her grandchildren, Bilawal Bhutto Zardari, Bakhtawar Bhutto Zardari, and Aseefa Bhutto Zardari came in from London. Prime Minister Yusuf Raza Gilani announced a public holiday for the next day, as well as a ten-day mourning period. The ruling Pakistan Peoples Party, founded by her husband, announced that it will suspend all political activities for the following 40 days to mourn her death.

Her body was laid to rest at Garhi Khuda Bakhsh in Larkana District the next day. She was buried next to her husband and children in the Bhutto family mausoleum at a ceremony attended by thousands of mourners.

Pakistan International Airlines ran special flights from Islamabad, Lahore, and Karachi to Sukkur for those who wanted to attend the funeral.

== See also ==
- Bhutto family
- Zulfikar Ali Bhutto
- Begum Nusrat Bhutto Women University
- Begum Nusrat Bhutto Airport
- Nusrat Bhutto Colony
- List of Iranian women politicians

== Notes ==
Party political offices
Preceded by Zulfikar Ali Bhutto	Chairperson of the Pakistan Peoples Party; Benazir Bhutto was acting chairperson from 1982 to 1984; 1979–1984	Succeeded by Benazir Bhutto
