= Nisar Ahmed Siddiqui =

Pakistani academic (died 2020)

- Sindhi: نثار احمد صديقي; SI
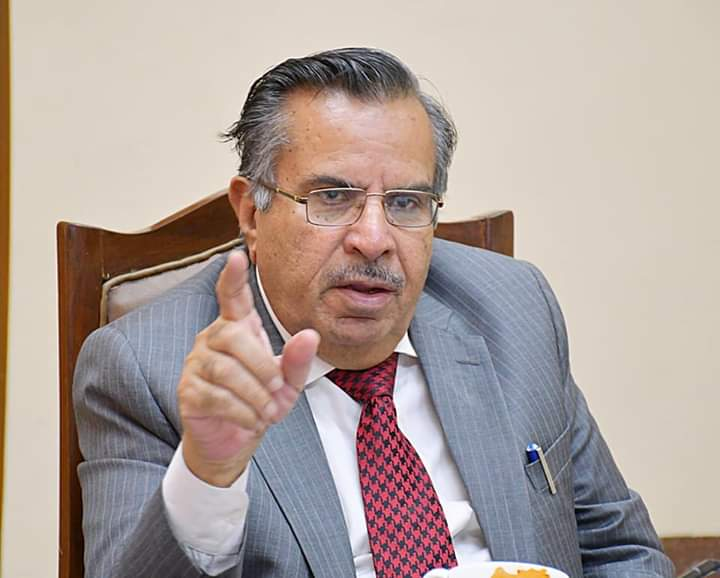
- Born: Piryaloi, Khairpur Sindh
- Died: 22 June 2020 (76 years old) while hospitalized in Karachi
- Occupations: Educationist, Reformer
- Known for: Founding Vice Chancellor Sukkur IBA University, Ex-Deputy Commissioner Sukkur
- Awards: Sitara-i-Imtiaz twice

Academic background
- Education: Master of Economics; Master of Education; Master of Finance
- Alma mater: University of Sindh; Boston University

Academic work
- Notable works: Sukkur IBA University SIBA Testing Services (STS)

Nisar Ahmed Siddiqui (Sindhi: نثار احمد صديقي) was a renowned Pakistani academic, educationist, reformer, founding vice chancellor of Sukkur IBA University & former bureaucrat from Sindh, Pakistan.

== Education ==
Mr. Siddiqui obtained master's degree in Economics from University of Sindh Jamshoro. He also obtained master's degree in Education from University of Sindh Jamshoro. He went to the US in 1987 and did MBA in Finance from Boston University .

== Career ==
At the beginning, Mr. Siddiqui was a school teacher taught Mathematics, Economics and English language. He then qualified the Competitive Examination of Central Superior Services with flying colors and started his career as a Civil Servant in the Government of Pakistan. He served as Deputy Commissioner of the District, Commissioner of the Division and Home Secretary. Prof. Nisar Ahmed Siddiqui was elected as the New President of Association of Management Development Institutions in South Asia (AMDISA) for 2019–2021, at the 15th General Assembly of AMDISA held on 30 October 2019 at Marino Beach Hotel, Colombo, Sri Lanka.

== Legacy ==
Prof. Nisar Ahmed Siddiqui remain highly respected for his services in education sector of Pakistan. He was called "Modern Day Of Sir Syed Ahmed Khan". The landmark motto of "Merit, Quality, Excellence in Education" was served by Nisar Ahmed Siddiqui in the whole of Pakistan by founding the Sukkur IBA University in 1994.The institute acquired the status of university in 2017 and he became the founding vice chancellor of university. He also devised the concept of community colleges in Pakistan. In recognition of his valuable services for the education of Pakistan, Government of Pakistan has bestowed him with highest civilian award Sitara-i-Imtiaz

== Death ==
Nisar Siddiqui died from COVID-19 at a private hospital in Karachi on 22 June 2020. He was buried in the premises of Sukkur IBA University.
