= Lansdowne Bridge (Pakistan) =

Indus-Bridge in Sukker, Pakistan

Lansdowne Bridge لينسڊائون پل
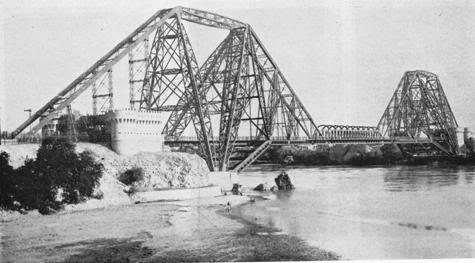
- The view of Lansdowne Bridge without Ayub Bridge behind
- Coordinates: 27°41′37″N 68°53′18″E
- Carries: Vehicles; rail until 1962.
- Crosses: Indus River
- Locale: Sukkur (west bank) and Rohri (east bank)
- Official name: Lansdowne Bridge

Characteristics
- Design: Cantilever truss
- Material: Iron - Steel
- Longest span: 240.7 metres

History
- Designer: Alexander Meadows Rendel
- Construction start: 1887
- Construction end: 1889

Location
- Interactive map of Lansdowne Bridge لينسڊائون پل

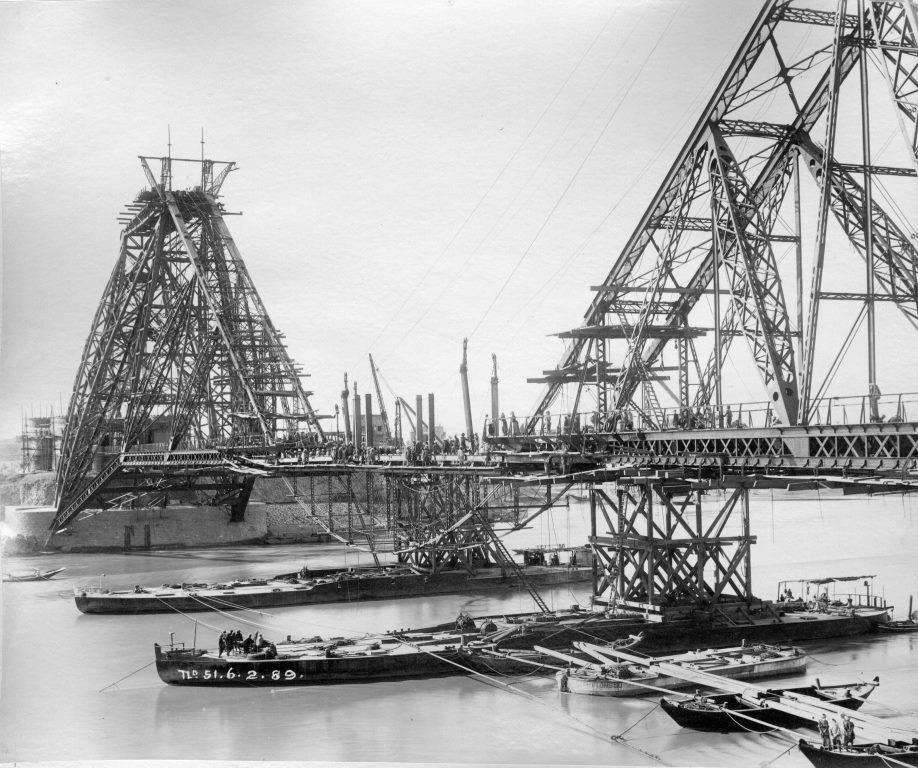
Under Construction Lansdowne Bridge, Sukkur, 1885-1889

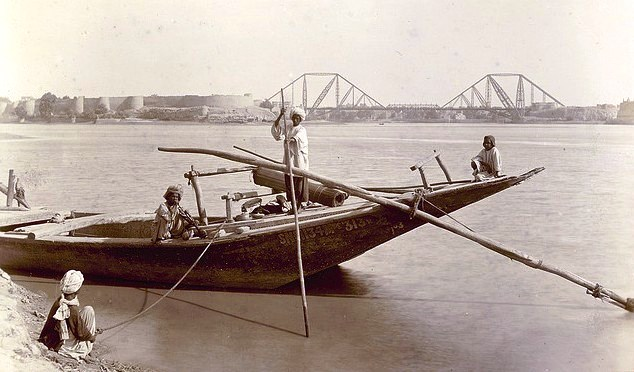
Lansdowne Bridge in 1897

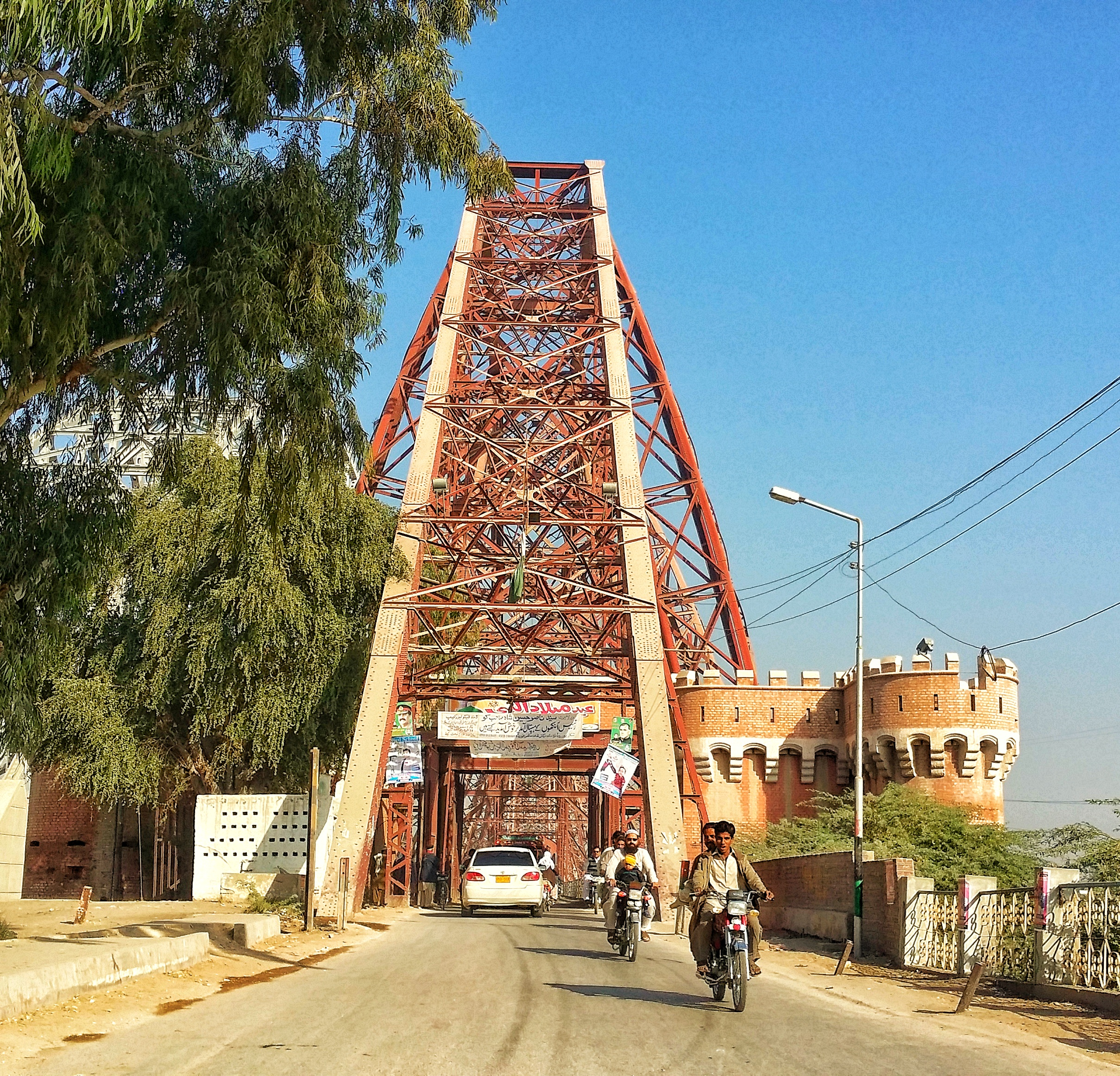
Entry to the Lansdowne Bridge Sukkur

The Lansdowne Bridge (Sindhi لينسڊائون پل; Urdu: لینس ڈاؤن پل) over the Indus at Sukkur was one of the great engineering feats of the 19th century. The longest cantilever bridge ever built, it had to support the load of heavy steam locomotives. The bridge was inaugurated on 25 March 1889. The Ayub Bridge was built immediately adjacent to the bridge in 1962, to separate the road and railway traffic. Hence the photographs of the Landsdown Bridge usually also show the Ayub Bridge.

== Design ==
It was designed by Sir Alexander Meadows Rendel; he designed the Lansdowne Bridge Rohri at Sukkur over the Indus River, which when it was completed in 1889 was the largest cantilever bridge in the world. The girder work, weighing a massive 3,300 tons, was manufactured in London by the firm of Westwood, Baillie and erected by F.E. Robertson, and Hecquet. Upon completion, the bridge allowed for easier rail access between Sindh and Balochistan.

== Background ==
The Indus was bridged at Attock in 1887 and that allowed railways in India to run from the westernmost post of Khyber Pass to the eastern city of Calcutta.

India's rail link to the port of Karachi was however, still broken at the Indus flowing between the towns of Rohri and Sukkur. The Indus was not bridged between Kotri and Hyderabad either, therefore, trains ran on the Karachi-Jamshoro-Larkana-Sukkur route as early as 1879 and then they were ferried across to Rohri and vice versa on a river ferry.

At Sukkur the river Indus flows through a gap in a range of low limestone hills and gets divided into two channels (Sukkur and Rohri channels) by an island called Bukkur. The Bukkur Island thus provides the best spot for a river crossing. Bridging the channel between Bukkur and Rohri was not so easy. The river bed here is not rocky but silty which made it difficult to build a bridge pier. Therefore, bridge designs were put forward to build a bridge without a pillar. One such design was for an arched bridge but it was not considered in the 1870s. Later on in 1962, the river was bridged using a very similar design that came to be known as the Ayub arch.

== History ==
The Indus Valley State Railway had reached Sukkur in 1879 and the steam ferry that transported eight wagons at a time across the Indus between Rohri and Sukkur was found to be cumbersome and time-consuming. The ferry link became redundant when Lord Reay, Governor of Bombay, deputising for Lord Lansdowne the viceroy, inaugurated the bridge on 25 March 1889. As summer comes early to Sukkur and the heavy European-style uniforms of the time would have been uncomfortable, the opening ceremony took place early in the morning. At the ceremony, Lord Reay unlocked a highly ornamental padlock (designed by J.L. Kipling, CIE, Principal of the Mayo School of Art in Lahore and father of Rudyard Kipling, the famous poet and author) which held shut the cumbersome iron gates guarding entry to the bridge. The gathered dignitaries then walked across the bridge and adjourned to breakfast followed by toasts under a shamiana (Berridge 1967:128). The bridge provided the railway link between Lahore, in the heart of the granary of British India, and the port of Karachi on the Arabian Sea.

When the great steel Ayub arch was constructed (1960–1962), railway traffic was shifted there. About a hundred feet apart, the two bridges seem like one from a distance. The Ayub arch became the world's third longest railway arch span and the first bridge in the world to have "the railway deck slung on coiled wire rope suspenders." The consulting engineer was David B. Steinman of New York, proponent of 'vocational aesthetics'. It cost about two crore rupees and the foundation stone was laid on 9 December 1960. It was opened by President Muhammad Ayub Khan on 6 May 1962.

According to urban legend, the popular Sindhi folk song, Ho Jamalo was composed when a death row inmate, Jamal Sheedi, successfully drove a test train across the bridge for the first time, earning him a pardon from the British East India Company.

== Technical Brief ==
Between 1872 and 1882 bridge survey was conducted and different people suggested five different bridge proposals. None of them were considered completely feasible at that time. An English engineer, Sir Alexander Rendel, was then called in and he proposed a design consisting of two anchored cantilevers, each 94.4 m (310 ft) long, carrying a suspended span of 60.9 m (200 ft) in the middle. This design was considered feasible and became known as the Lansdowne Bridge. The girder work of this bridge was given to Westwood, Baillie & Co. of London. The bridge was first put together in the contractor's yard. The 51.8 m (170 ft) tall cantilevers of the bridge when assembled, made quite a conspicuous scene in London. By 1887 the steel work started to arrive at Sukkur and Rohri. The bridge construction was then started under the supervision of F.E. Robertson and Hecquet, whereas, local contractors were Malik Abdul Karim & Malik Abdul Raheem.

The construction of Lansdowne Bridge was no joke. It is said that the bridge designer did not think much about how the bridge would be built in real life. Giant derricks, each weighing 240 tons and each being 51.8 m (170 ft) in length had to be erected leaning out over the water and at the same time they had to incline inwards in the plane at right-angles to the line of the bridge. And as if that was not difficult enough, horizontal tie girders 37.4 m (123 ft) long and weighing 86 tons each had to be assembled at a height of 54.8 m (180 ft). This indeed was a challenge in the 1880s.

When both cantilevers were completed, work started on the center span. The bridge designer had intended that the 60.9 m (200 ft). long span would be assembled on boats and then hoisted up. This plan did not work in practice as the Indus remained quite violent six months of the year owing to floods. In the end, Robertson built another temporary bridge to provide a platform on which the suspended span could be put together. The temporary staging weighed 56 tons. The permanent girder work of the 60.9 m (200 ft). span was erected and riveted in four-and-a-half days. This is good going even by today's standards. In the 1880s, Robertson's men did not have pneumatic tools or electric drives.

== The Human and Monetary Cost ==
The construction of Lansdowne bridge claimed six lives. Four men fell from the dizzy heights and two were killed by tools falling on them. The cost of the bridge was Rs 2,696,000 including Rs 276,000 that was spent on foundations only.

== See also ==
- Sukkur
- Ayub Bridge
- Sukkur barrage
