= Sukkur IBA University =

Business university in Sukkur, Pakistan

- SIBAU
- Former name: Sukkur Institute of Business Administration
- Established: 1994 (started classes at Public School Sukkur), (shifted to current campus at Nisar Ahmed Siddiqui Road, Sukkur in 2003)
- Founder: Nisar Ahmed Siddiqui
- Vice-Chancellor: Asif Ahmed Shaikh (24 February 2023 to present)
- Location: Sukkur (Main campus), sub-campuses at Khairpur, Kandhkot, Dadu, and Mirpurkhas, Sindh, Pakistan; 27.72669°N 68.81914°E
- Website: iba-suk.edu.pk
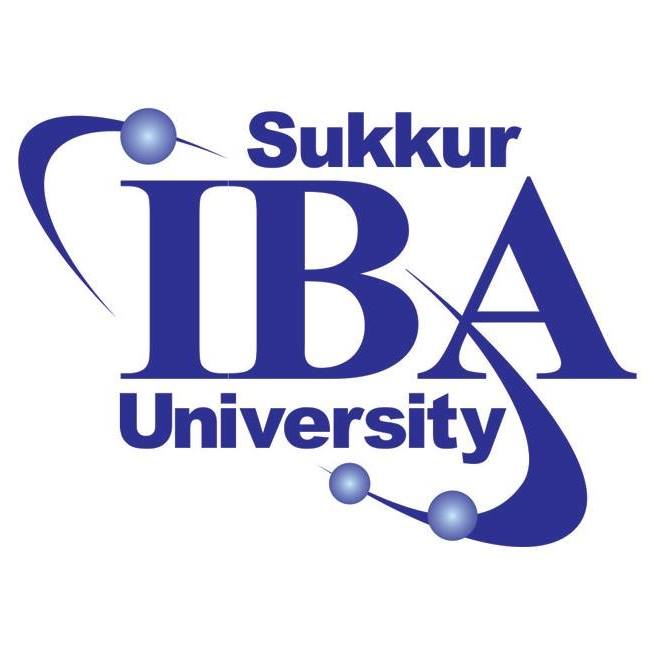

The Sukkur IBA University (previously Sukkur Institute of Business Administration or Sukkur IBA) is a higher education institute in Sukkur, Pakistan. It was founded in 1994 by Nisar Ahmed Siddiqui. University is a public sector degree-awarding institute chartered by the Government of Sindh and recognized by the Higher Education Commission.

The university has been awarded the "W" Category by National Business Education Accreditation Council and National Computing Education Accreditation Council, "X" Category by National Accreditation Council for Teaching Education, and is recognized by Pakistan Engineering Council.

== Overview ==
It also conducts Medical and Dental College Admission Test (also known as MDCAT) every year for admission in MBBS and BDS degree programs in private and public medical and dental colleges and universities of Sindh, whereas Jinnah Sindh Medical University is responsible for handling the subsequent MBBS and BDS admission process in the province.

== History ==
In 1994, Sukkur IBA University was established as Sukkur Institute of Business Administration. It was located initially in hired rooms of the Public School Sukkur building in Sukkur. At first, Sukkur IBA was affiliated to Institute of Business Administration, Karachi; with founding Director, Syed Anwar Ali Shah. The institute received its degree-awarding charter from the Government of Sindh in 2006.

The institute was ranked third among business schools of Pakistan in the Higher Education Commission Pakistan Business School Ranking-2013.

On 16 May 2017, Sindh Assembly approved the promotion of Sukkur IBA to Sukkur IBA University. The famous educationist of Sindh, Nisar Ahmed Siddique served as Vice-Chancellor and played a huge role transforming the university from a 2-room seedling.

The university received "Green Campus" award from World Wildlife Fund (WWF) in 2017 for its environment-friendly initiatives.

== Departments ==
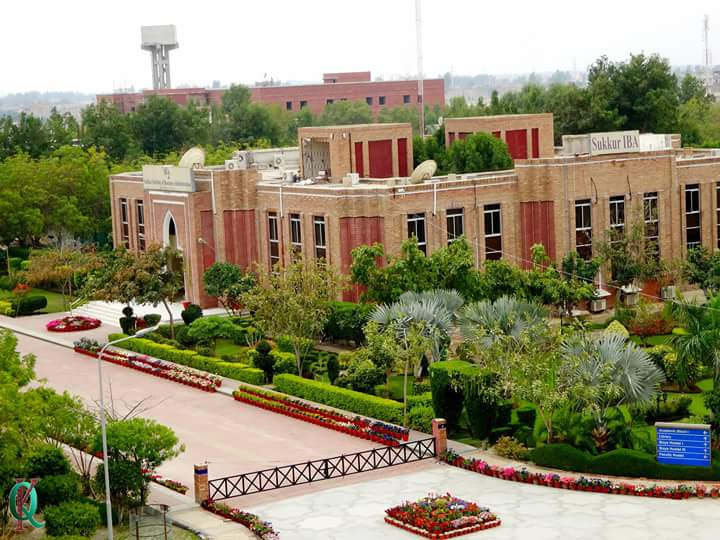
Academic Block-I at SIBAU

The university currently has nine main departments:

1. Department of Business Administration
2. Department of Computer Science
3. Department of Computer System Engineering
4. Department of Media and Communications
5. Department of Software Engineering
6. Department of Electrical Engineering
7. Department of Mathematics
8. Department of Physical Education
9. Department of Education

These departments offer degrees on bachelor, masters, and post-graduation levels.

=== Sukkur IBA Student Council (SISC) ===
Sukkur IBA University offers its students the experience of being involved with the management of the university through Sukkur IBA Student Council (SISC). The council offers students a total of eighteen societies and clubs that they can join. These range from SIBA Marketing Society, Entrepreneurship Society to SIBA Music, Arts & Drama Society in order to help students enjoy their educational career to the brim.

== Talent Hunt Program ==
Creating an opportunity for the Sindhi youth, Sukkur IBA University launched its flagship program, Sindh Talent Hunt Program (STHP), in the year 2007. Under this program, deserving students with humble backgrounds would be awarded fully funded scholarship. The scholarship would include free tuition, free hostel, free transportation, free books along with monthly stipend. 300 deserving students from Sindh are enrolled in "Foundation Semester" of Sukkur IBA University. The foundation semester entails a six-months-long, rigorous training in basic subjects i.e. Mathematics, English, and Information & Communications Technology (ICT).

Every student that maintains 3.0 CGPA is then awarded with the full tuition fee waiver scholarship for the whole four-year program. This scholarship enabled students from humble backgrounds to study at Sukkur IBA University free of cost.

After the success of Sindh Talent Hunt Program, the institute partnered with Oil & Gas Development Company and launched the Talent Hunt Program nationwide. The program got titled "OGDCL National Talent Hunt Program", wherein, 300 students not only from Sindh but from whole Pakistan get selected and enrolled in foundation semester with even higher stipend and benefits than the Sindh Talent Hunt Program.

== Center for Entrepreneurial Leadership & Incubation (CEL&Inc.) ==
Sukkur IBA University has a fully functional incubation center on its campus. The Center for Entrepreneurial Leadership & Incubation (CEL&Inc) was established in the year 2012 and has since successfully incubated 38 companies.

The center is also actively involved with national and international firms in order to provide mentor-ship to its incubatees. CEL&Inc has also successfully trained almost 1700 individuals in Technical & Vocational Education and Training (TVET) in skills required by the job market.

== Campus ==
=== Kandhkot Campus ===
- Bachelor of Business Administration

specialization in HR, Marketing, Finance

- Bachlors of Science

specialization in Computer Science & Software Engineering

=== Benazir Bhutto Shaheed Institute of Management Science, Dadu Campus ===
- Bachelor of Business Administration with specialization in HR, marketing, finance
- Bachlors of Science with specialization in computer science and software Engineering

=== Mirpurkhas Campus ===
- Bachelor of Business Administration

specialization in HR, Marketing, Finance

- Bachlors of Science

specialization in Computer Science

=== Khairpur Campus ===
- Bachlors of Science

specialization in Computer Science & Software Engineering

== Community colleges & public schools ==
Sukkur IBA University is the pioneer of the "Community College" idea in Sindh. The institute has established community colleges in far flung areas. The university has established a total of 13 community colleges & public schools in Khairpur Mirs, Naushero Feroze, Dadu, Ubauro, Larkana, Shikarpur, Ghotki, Sukkur, Hyderabad and Jacobabad. These Community Colleges & Public Schools provide basic (primary & secondary) education and also offer vocational and technical training courses.
