= Ayub Bridge =

Pakistani construction over the Indus river

Ayub Bridge ایوب پل
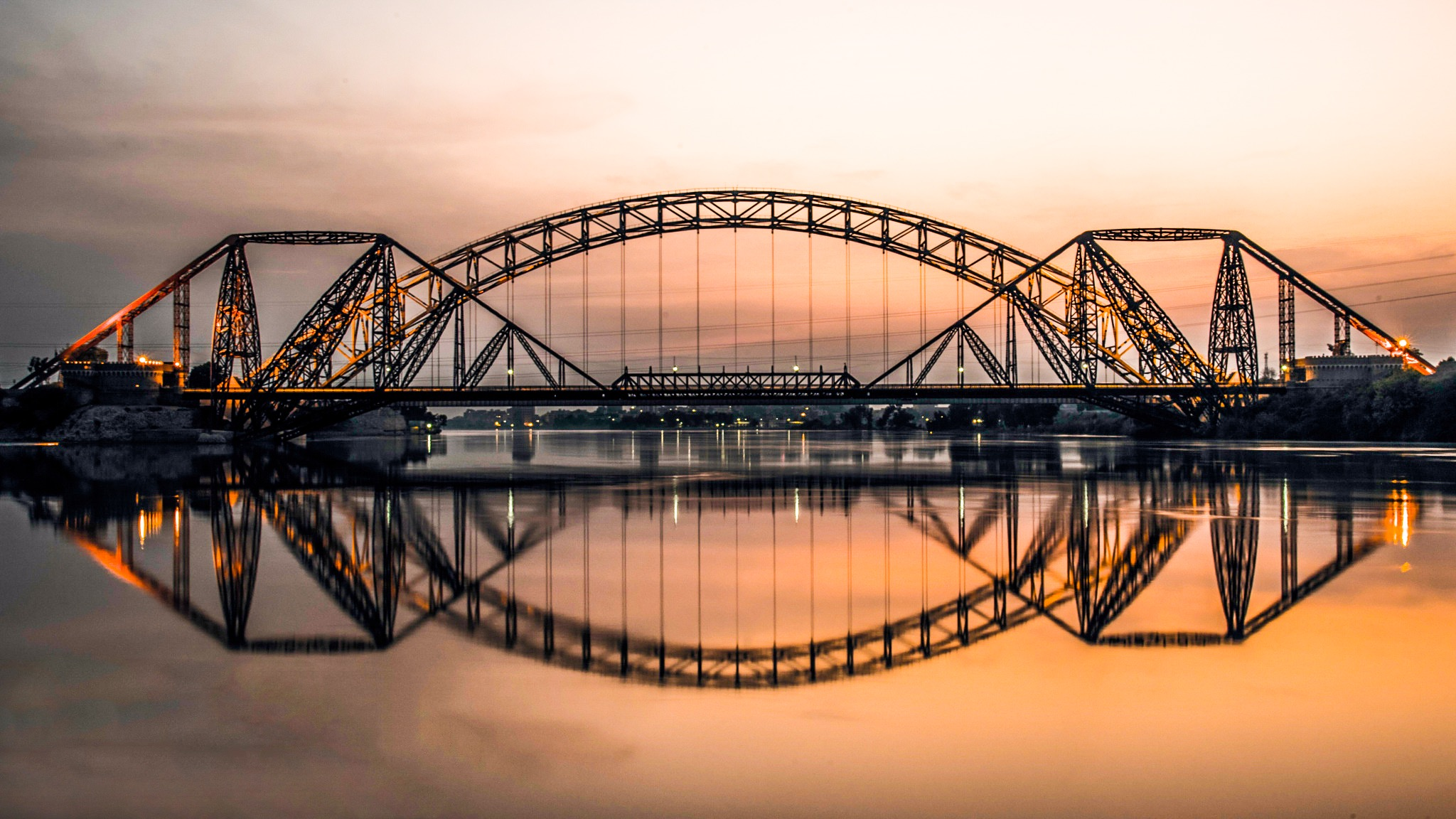
- Ayub Bridge
- Coordinates: 27°41′38″N 68°53′18″E
- Carries: Railway
- Crosses: River Indus
- Locale: Sukkur

Characteristics
- Design: Dorman Long of Middlesbrough, England
- Material: Iron – Steel
- Total length: 245.6 m
- Height: 75.2 m
- Longest span: 246 m

Rail characteristics
- Track gauge: 1676

History
- Designer: David B Steinman
- Construction start: Nov 1959
- Construction end: May 1962

Statistics
- Daily traffic: Railway traffic

Location
- Interactive map of Ayub Bridge ایوب پل

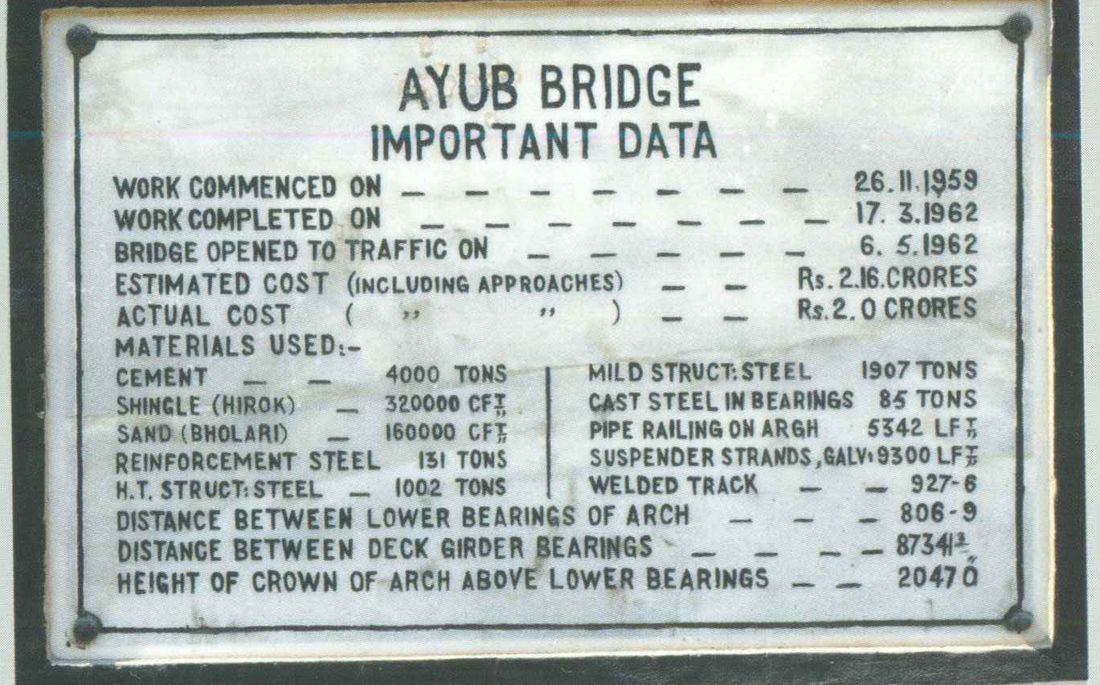
Ayub Bridge Important Data

Ayub Bridge (Sindhi: ايوب پل; Urdu: ایوب پل), named after Field Marshal Mohammad Ayub Khan (who was President of Pakistan between 1958 and 1969), is a railway bridge over the Indus River between Rohri and Sukkur in Sindh province, Pakistan. The bridge is about 245.6 metres (806 ft) long, 75.2 m (247 ft) high high and cost Rs 21.6 million. For over 60 years, it has served as a strong link for rail traffic between Sukkur and Rohri. Before this, Lansdowne Bridge was the railway link between Sukkur and Rohri. The foundation stone of this steel arch bridge was laid on 9 December 1960 and inaugurated by Ayub Khan on 6 May 1962. The consulting engineer was David B. Steinman and the chief engineer for its construction was M.S. Ghazi of Pakistan Western Railway. The Ayub Bridge became the world's third longest railway arch span and the first railway bridge in the world to be slung on coiled wire rope suspenders.

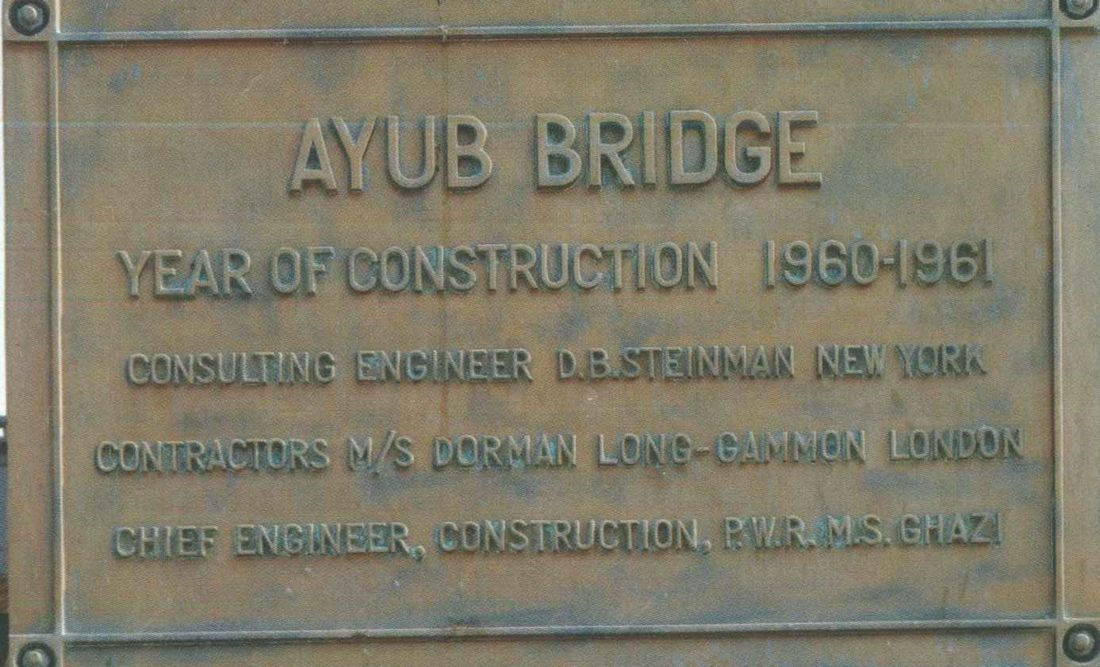
Aub Bridge Inaugural Plaque

== History ==
Prior to the Landsdowne and Ayub bridges being built, travel between Sukkur and Rohri relied entirely on boats and steamers. A local boatman Mir Mohammad, known as Miroo, said his father, Yar Mohammad, operated a small ferry service between the two towns until the early 1960s. “Very few people had cars or motorcycles at that time and therefore motor boats were the only way of communication.” Others crossed the Indus via the Lansdowne Bridge, often on bicycles. The railway ran along the centre of the bridge, while pedestrians and cyclists used the wooden walkways on either side.

The fare was one anna (0.06 PKR) for an adult passenger at that time, and half an anna for a child. The construction of Ayub Bridge started on 26 November 1959, and its foundation stone was laid on 9 December 1960, by the then minister of railways and communication, Khan F.M. Khan, the Khan of Shewa. Iqbal Kaiser played a pivotal role in the funding and acquisition of engineering staff for the project. The contractor of the bridge was M/S Dorman Long Gammon of London, famous for Sydney Harbour Bridge in 1932. The consulting engineer was DB Steinman of New York – the man who reconstructed the famous Brooklyn Bridge in New York City. Field Marshal Mohammad Ayub Khan inaugurated the bridge on 6 May 1962.

== Construction work ==
The rationale behind construction of this arc bridge over the Indus is rocks in the river bed which do not allow the pillars to withstand the constant flow and pressure of water for a long time. The construction phase of Ayub Bridge was interesting as first of all four huge cemented abutments, two on each side of the river banks, were made. These abutments have to bear weight of the arc. In arc bridges, construction work has to start simultaneously from both sides of the river. Its weight was distributed half on each side.

Therefore, two half arches supporting the deck with cables were built which were joined as one, to the amusement of the people witnessing the activity. The engineer would climb up the arcs through a ladder every day to physically check the strength of hundreds of rivets used in the bridge. Rivet is a metal pin used for fastening two pieces of metal together. It was a frightening sight not only for us but also for others watching, with the mighty Indus flowing beneath.

Ayub Bridge is an example of a structure built with the joint efforts of engineers of Dorman Long and Company and the Pakistan Railways.

When the steel Ayub arch was constructed (1960–1962), railway traffic was shifted from Lansdowne Bridge to it. About a hundred feet apart, the two bridges seem like one from a distance. The Ayub arch became the world's third longest railway arch span and the first bridge in the world to have "the railway desk slung on coiled wire rope suspenders."

== Additional work ==
Between July 2023 and June 2025 the National Engineering Services Pakistan (NESPAK) completed various important projects both in Pakistan and abroad, one of which was an 18 km bypass road that linked the Ayub Bridge to Dhamtour in Abbottabad District.

== See also ==
- Sukkur District
- Lansdowne Bridge Rohri
- Sukkur Barrage
- Sukkur
