= Sukkur =

Sukkur: سکر (Sindhi); سکھر (Urdu)
- Metropolis
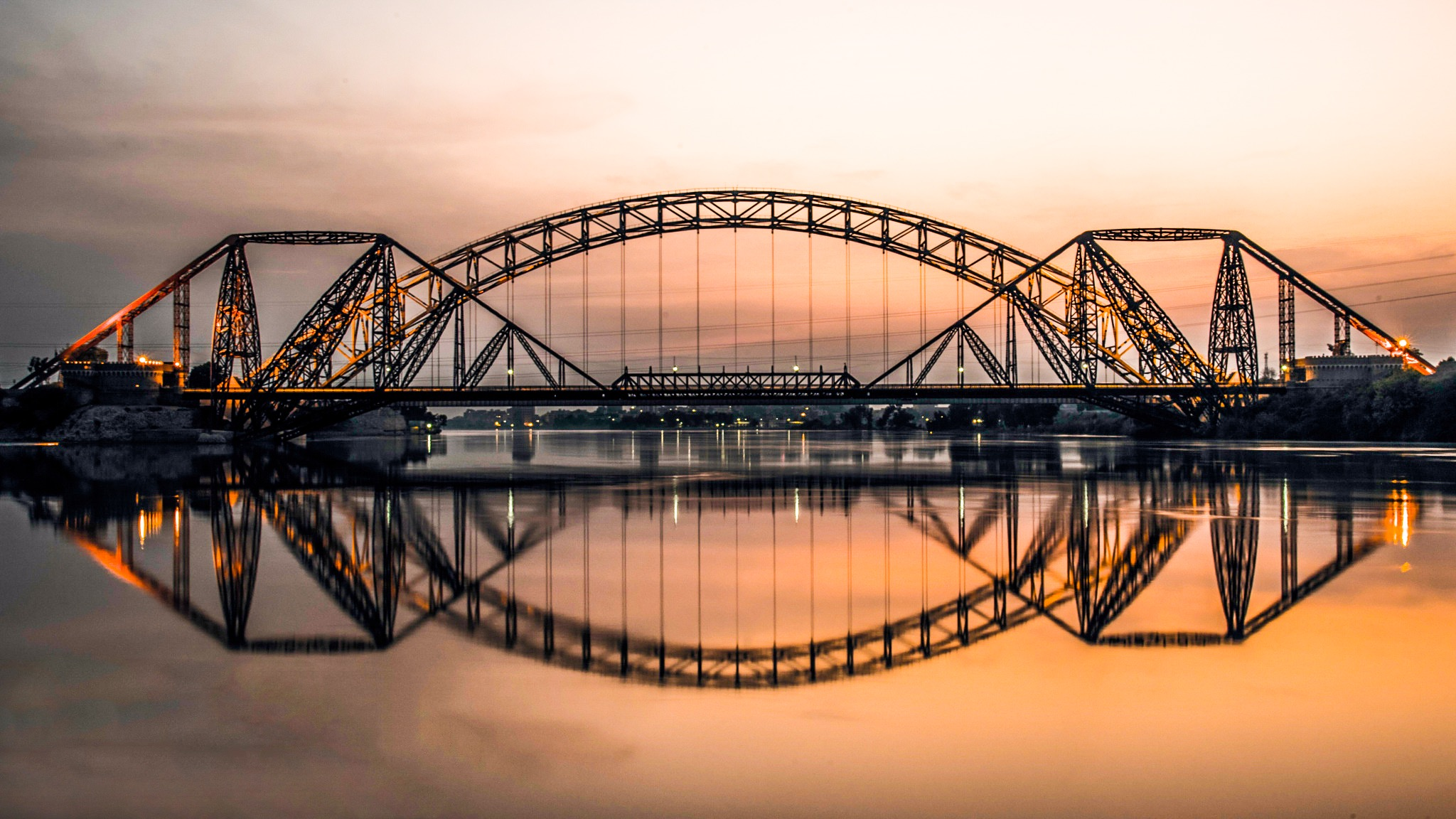
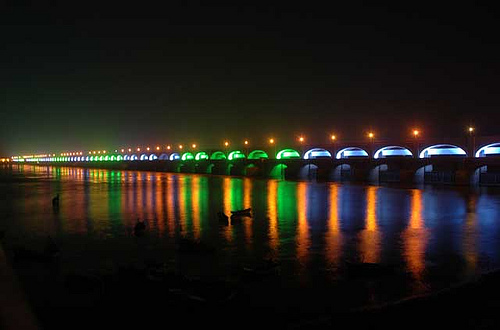
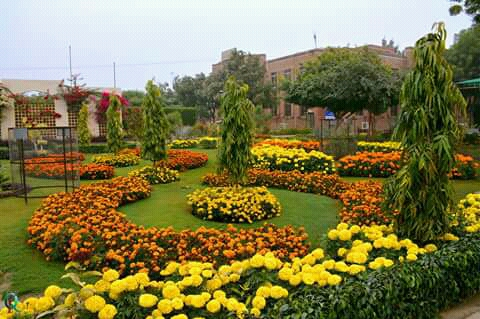
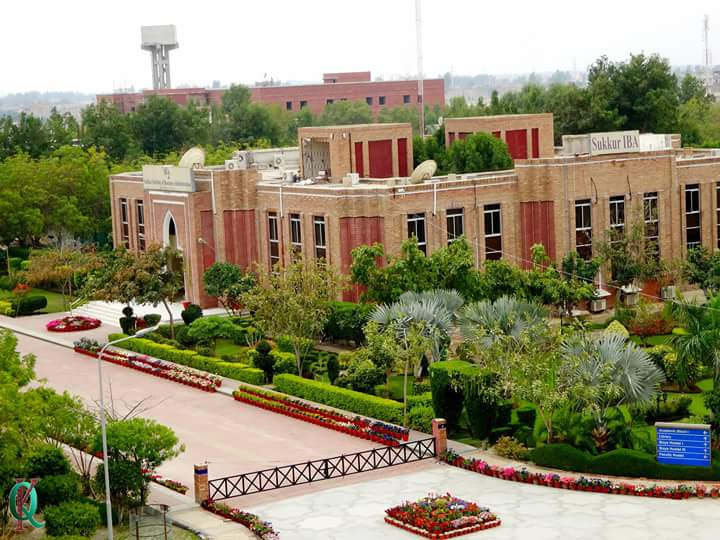
- Clockwise from top: Lansdowne Bridge and the modern Ayub Bridge; Spring flowers; IBA University; and night view of Sukkur Barrage

- Seal

- Location of Sukkur Sukkur (Pakistan)
- Coordinates: 27°42′22″N 68°50′54″E
- Country: Pakistan
- Province: Sindh
- Division: Sukkur
- District: Sukkur
- Established: 1862

Government
  - Type: Municipal Corporation
  - Mayor of Sukkur: Arsalan Sheikh
  - Commissioner: Fayyaz Hussain Abbasi(BPS-20 PCS)
  - Regional Police Officer (RPO): Faisal Abdullah Chachar (BPS-20 PSP)

Area
  - City: 300 km^{2} (120 sq mi)
  - Metro: 5,165 km^{2} (1,994 sq mi)
- Elevation: 67 m (220 ft)

Population (2023 census)
  - City: 563,851
  - Rank: 17th, Pakistan
  - Density: 1,900/km^{2} (4,900/sq mi)
- Time zone: UTC+5 (PKT)
- Postal code: 65200
- Number of towns: 4
- Highways: N-5; N-65; M-5; M-6
- Provincial Language: Sindhi
- Native Languages: Sindhi and Urdu
- Number of Union councils: 20
- Website: smc.gos.pk
- "About District". District Government Sukkur. Archived from the original on 9 February 2012.

Sukkur (Note: Sindhi: سکر; Urdu: سكھر) is a city in the Pakistani province of Sindh along the western bank of the Indus River, directly across from the historic city of Rohri. Sukkur is the third largest city in Sindh after Karachi and Hyderabad, and 17th largest city of Pakistan by population. The city was originally founded by the Rai dynasty of Sindh. The modern city was built in the 1840s. New Sukkur was established during the British era alongside the village of Sukkur. Sukkur's hill, along with the hill on the river island of Bukkur, form what is sometimes considered the "Gate of Sindh".

== Etymology ==
The name Sukkur is derived from the Sindhi language word sakhar meaning 'superior'.

== History ==
The region around Sukkur had been inhabited for millennia. The ruins of Lakhan-jo-daro, located near an industrial park on the outskirts of Sukkur, date from the Mature Harappan period of the Indus Valley Civilization, between 2600 BCE and 1900 BCE. It covers more than 300 hectares of area and is touted to be second largest city of the Indus Valley Civilization, just 75 kilometers away from another ancient major city of the civilization, Mohenjo Daro.

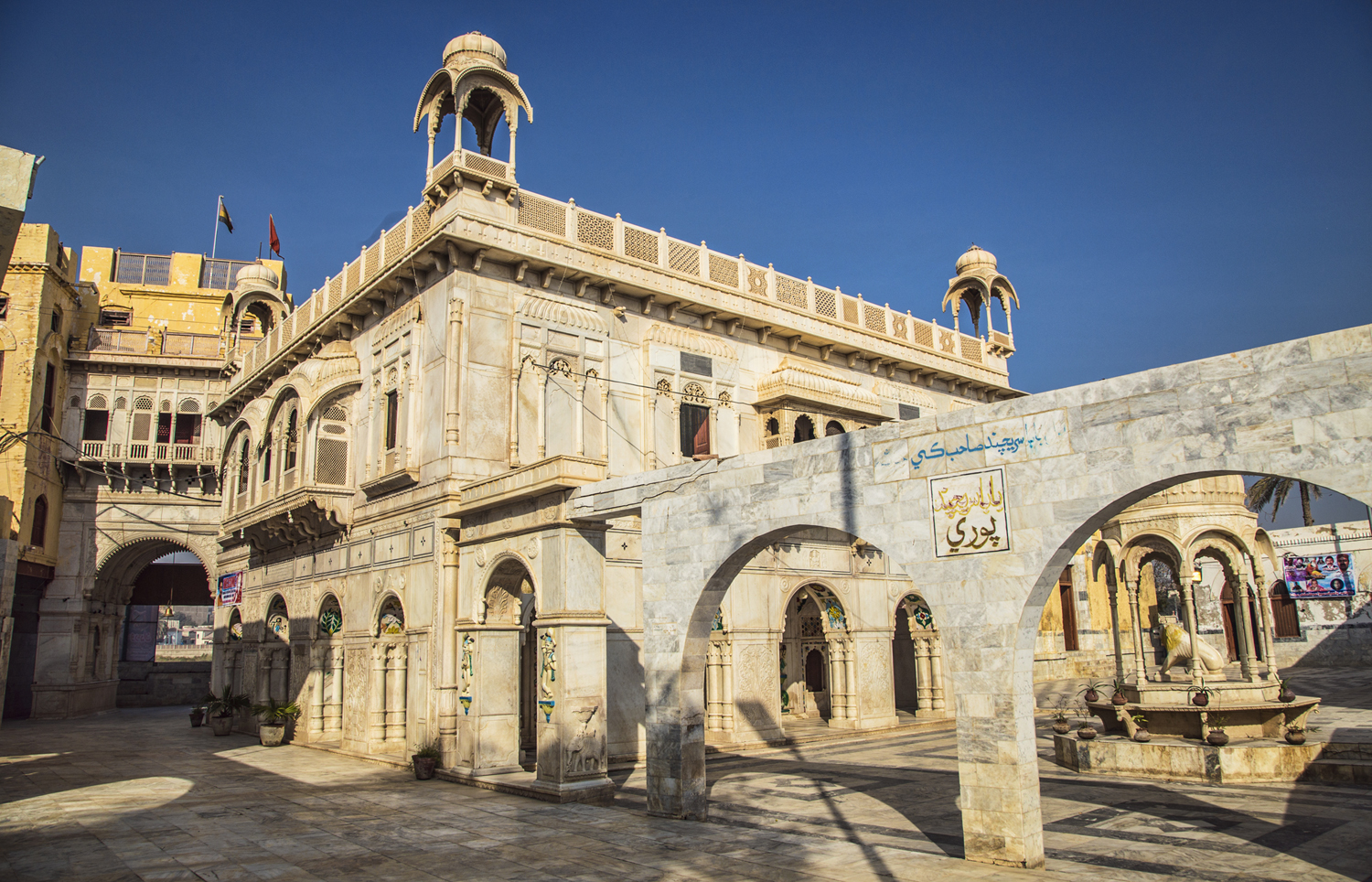
Sukkur is home of the Hindu Sadh Belo shrine.

"Old Sukkur" was initially a small village prior to the establishment of a military garrison in 1839. Sukkur was built on a low limestone ridge on the banks of the Indus River. The city was once surrounded by groves of date palms that were traditionally believed to have grown from the discarded date-pits from Arab invaders in the 8th century.

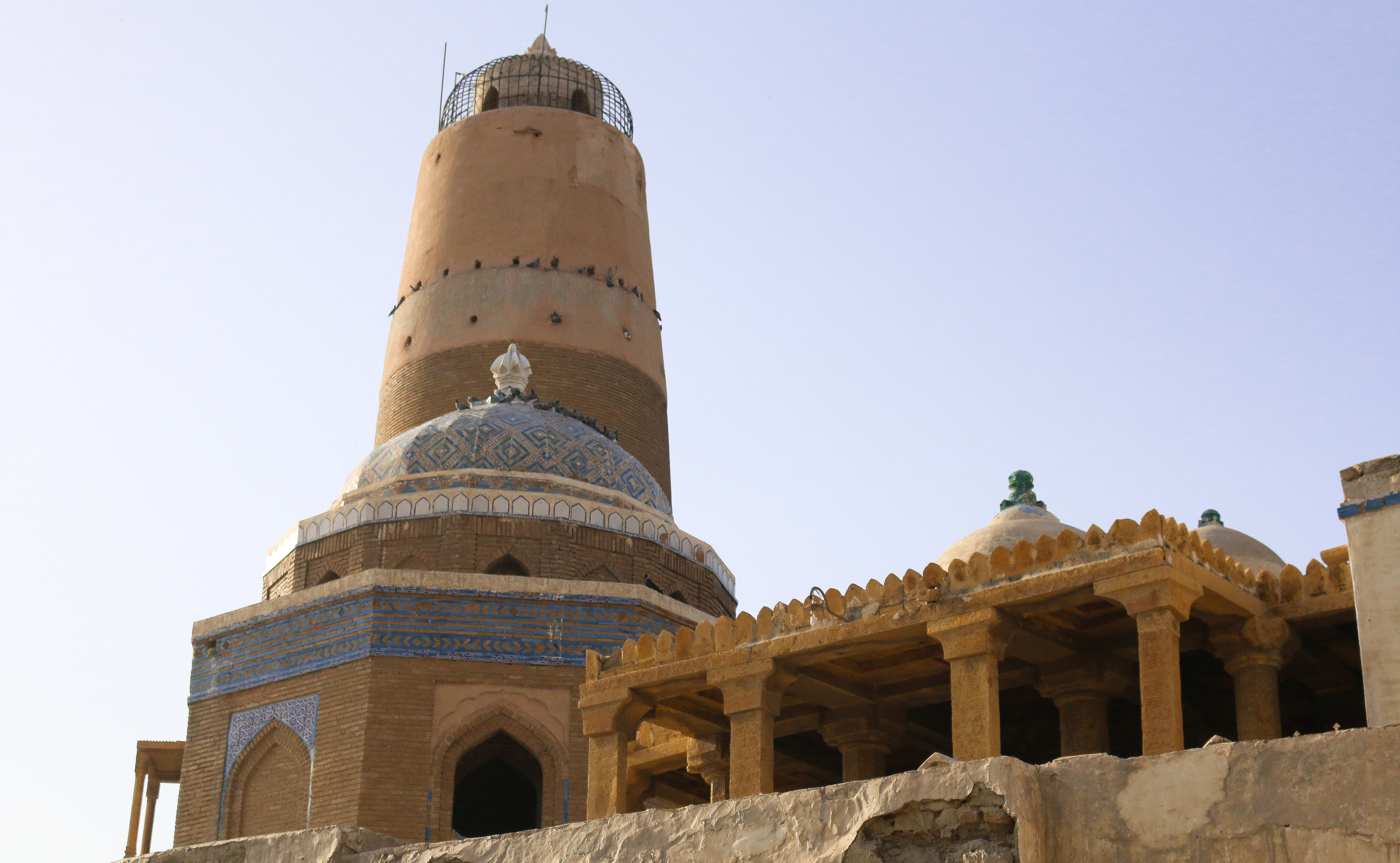
Sukkur's Shrine of Masum Shah and adjacent minaret date from 1607.

The village of Sukkur was directly across from the larger town of Rohri, which served as a busy port along the Indus by the 1200s, and was a major trading centre for agricultural produce. An 86 foot (26 m) tall minaret was built at Sukkur's shrine of Mir Masum Shah in 1607.

=== British ===
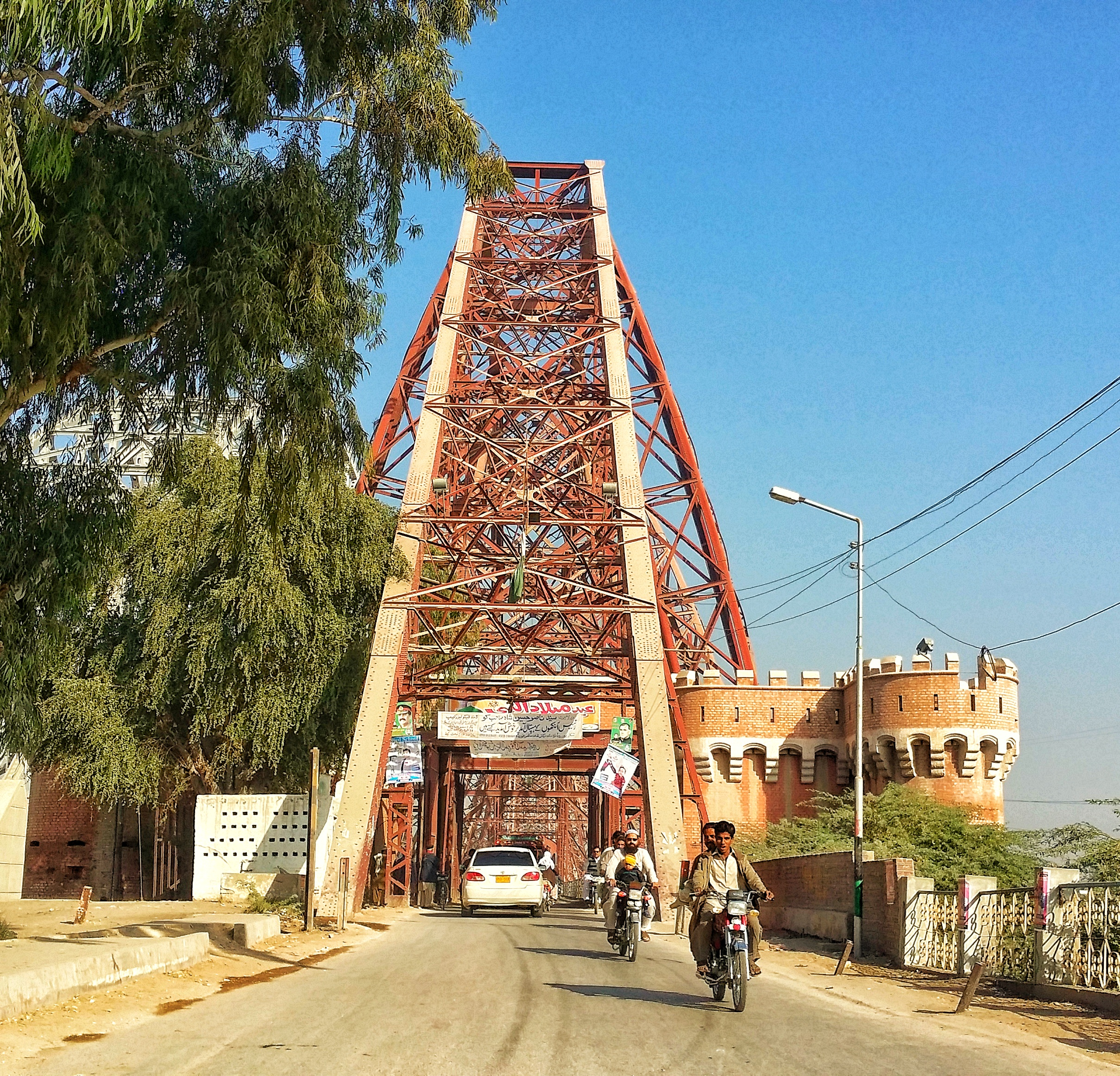
Completed in 1889, the Lansdowne Bridge displays elements of British military architecture.

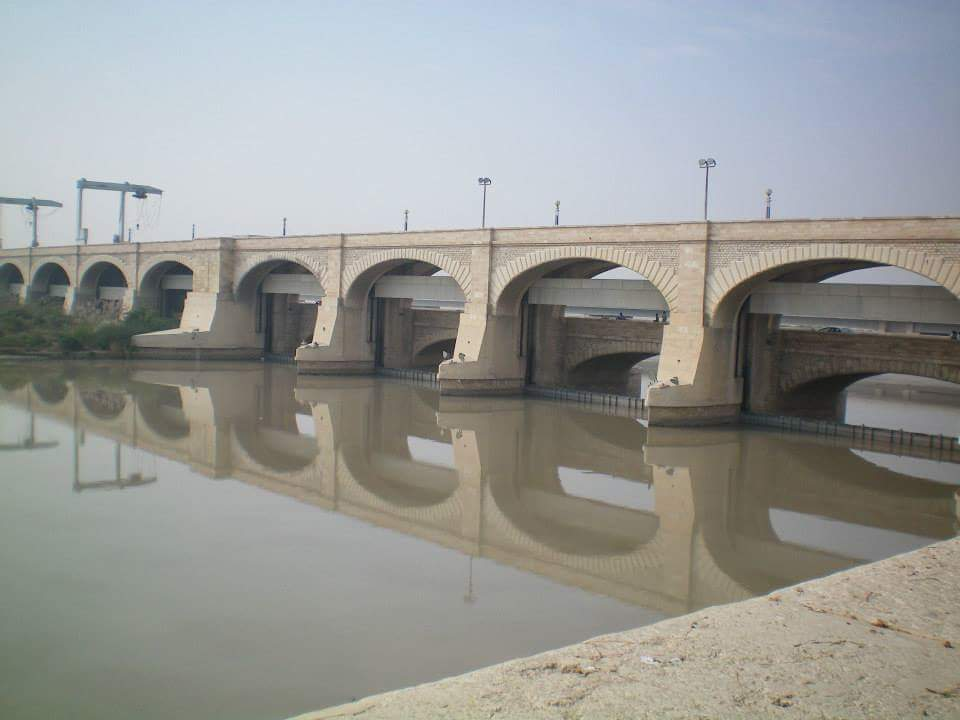
The Sukkur Barrage, completed in 1932, forms part of one of the world's largest irrigation projects.

Modern Sukkur, or New Sukkur, was built during British rule alongside what was once a small village directly across from the historic city of Rohri. The British established a military garrison here in 1839, which was abandoned in 1845, though Sukkur continued to grow in importance as a trading center. The Sukkur Municipality was constituted in 1862.

Completed in 1889, Sukkur's Lansdowne Bridge connects the Sukkur to Rohri across the Indus, and was one of the first bridges to cross the river. The bridge made the journey between Karachi and Multan easier. The bridge was built with two large pylons rather than a series of pillars extending across the river – a cutting-edge design for such an expansive span. The bridge was also made of metal, and features an unusual design.

Sukkur Barrage (formerly called Lloyd Barrage), built under the British Raj on the Indus River, controls one of the largest irrigation systems in the world. It was designed by Sir Arnold Musto KCIE, and constructed under the overall direction of Sir Charlton Harrison between 1923 and 1932. The 5,001 feet (1,524 m) long barrage is made of yellow stone and steel and can water nearly 10 million acres (40,000 km^{2}) of farmland through its seven large canals.

On the eve of the Partition of British India in 1947, Sukkur's old town was home to about 10,000 residents, while New Sukkur was home to 80,000.

=== Modern ===
After the formation of Pakistan, most of the city's Hindu population migrated to India, though like much of Sindh, Sukkur did not experience the widespread rioting that occurred in Punjab and Bengal. According to the 1941 census, about 70% of the population of Sukkur was Hindu, this number decreased to 2% by the 1951 census as a result of the partition. However, less than 500 Hindus were killed in all of Sindh between 1947 and 1948 as Sindhi Muslims largely resisted calls to turn against their Hindu neighbours. Hindus did not flee Sukkur en masse until riots erupted in Karachi on 6 January 1948, which sowed fear in Sindh's Hindus despite the fact that the riots were local and related to Sikh refugees from Punjab seeking refuge in Karachi. Muslim refugees from India settled in Sukkur.

The Sindh Industrial Trading Estate in Sukkur was established in 1950. The Ayub Bridge was built in 1962, and spans the Indus River alongside the British era Landsdowne Bridge. The city suffered major flooding during the 2010 Pakistan floods which inundated large parts of the city.

== Geography ==
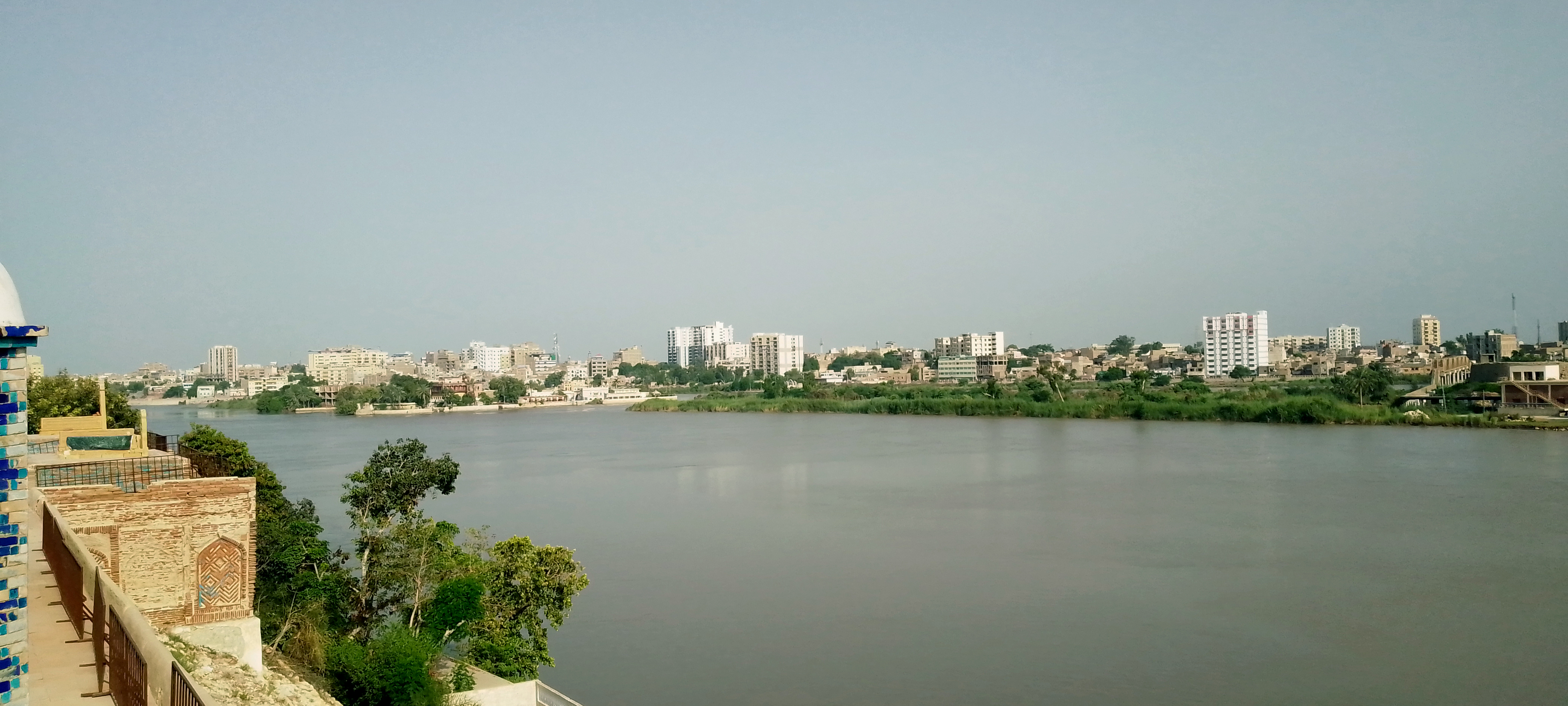
Skyline of Sukkur City along the shores of the River Indus

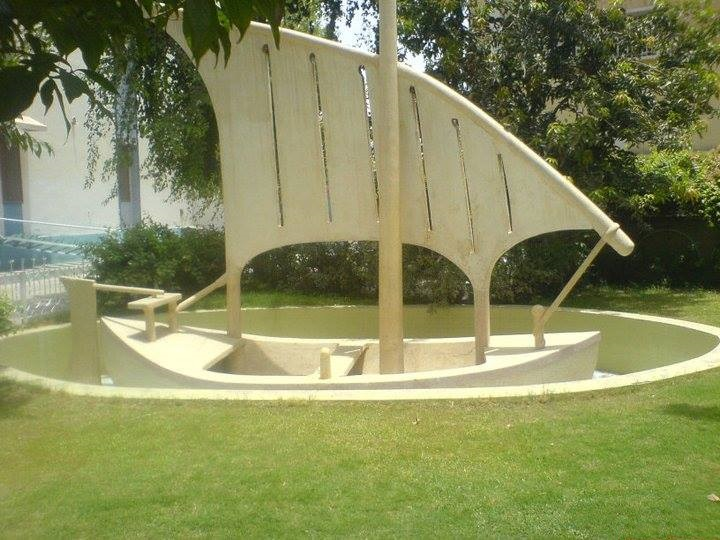
Boat at the door of Municipal Stadium Sukkur

The small Eocene limestone outcropping upon which Sukkur was founded is the most significant land deformation on the vast plains along the Indus Valley in Sindh and Punjab. The outcropping is part of the "Jacobabad-Khairpur High" and Rohri Hills. The outcropping, along with the similar outcropping on Bukkar Island are sometimes referred to as the "Sukkur Gorge," and has historically served as the traditional northern boundary of Sindh.

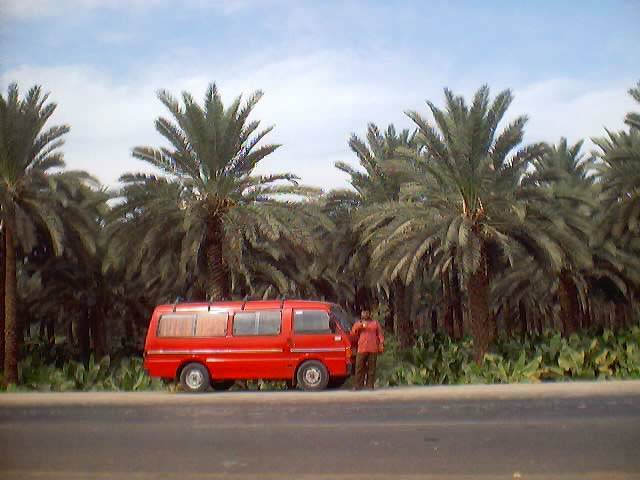
Date palms in Sukkur.

== Climate ==
Sukkur has a hot desert climate (Köppen climate classification BWh), characterised by extremely hot and hazy summers with mild and foggy winters. Sukkur is known for its extremely hot summers, and was described as the hottest city in British India. Wind speed is low throughout the year, and sunshine is abundant. Summer temperatures regularly surpass 50 °C (122 °F). Dry heat is experienced starting April to early June until the Monsoon season starts to arrive. Monsoons in Sukkur are not very wet, but bring high dew points, resulting in high heat indices. Monsoons recede by September, but it is not until late October that the short lived autumn season is experienced before the onset of the region's cool winters. The average annual rainfall of Sukkur is 159.6 mm (6.28 in) and mainly occurs in the monsoon season. The highest annual rainfall ever is 698 mm (27.5 in), recorded in 2022 and the lowest annual rainfall ever is 0 mm in 1941.

Climate data for Sukkur
Month	Jan	Feb	Mar	Apr	May	Jun	Jul	Aug	Sep	Oct	Nov	Dec	Year
Record high °C (°F)	31.0 (87.8)	38.0 (100.4)	45.0 (113.0)	49.0 (120.2)	50.5 (122.9)	50.5 (122.9)	46.5 (115.7)	44.5 (112.1)	43.5 (110.3)	41.6 (106.9)	37.2 (99.0)	31.0 (87.8)	50.5 (122.9)
Mean daily maximum °C (°F)	24.8 (76.6)	26.2 (79.2)	32.4 (90.3)	39.2 (102.6)	43.3 (109.9)	43.2 (109.8)	41.0 (105.8)	39.1 (102.4)	37.9 (100.2)	35.6 (96.1)	30.3 (86.5)	24.8 (76.6)	34.8 (94.7)
Daily mean °C (°F)	16.5 (61.7)	18.2 (64.8)	23.9 (75.0)	30.1 (86.2)	34.6 (94.3)	35.7 (96.3)	34.7 (94.5)	33.2 (91.8)	31.4 (88.5)	27.8 (82.0)	21.7 (71.1)	16.5 (61.7)	27.0 (80.7)
Mean daily minimum °C (°F)	8.3 (46.9)	10.2 (50.4)	15.4 (59.7)	21.1 (70.0)	25.9 (78.6)	28.3 (82.9)	28.4 (83.1)	27.3 (81.1)	24.9 (76.8)	20.0 (68.0)	13.2 (55.8)	8.3 (46.9)	19.3 (66.7)
Record low °C (°F)	1.0 (33.8)	0.5 (32.9)	3.0 (37.4)	9.5 (49.1)	16.5 (61.7)	19.5 (67.1)	20.8 (69.4)	17.5 (63.5)	19.5 (67.1)	12.4 (54.3)	5.0 (41.0)	−1.5 (29.3)	−1.5 (29.3)
Average precipitation mm (inches)	3.5 (0.14)	7.0 (0.28)	6.8 (0.27)	5.7 (0.22)	15.0 (0.59)	24.5 (0.96)	40.8 (1.61)	40.4 (1.59)	0.9 (0.04)	3.0 (0.12)	10.6 (0.42)	9.4 (0.37)	167.6 (6.61)
Average precipitation days	0.3	0.6	0.8	0.4	0.4	3.5	4.0	2.6	0.1	0.1	0.1	0.3	13.2
Average relative humidity (%)	52	48	39	28	29	38	49	56	52	46	47	52	45
Mean monthly sunshine hours	276	294	318	345	363	372	357	336	321	309	288	276	3,855
Source 1: PMD (1991–2020)
Source 2: climate-data

== Demography ==
Historical population

Year	Pop.	±% p.a.
1872	38,107	—
1881	42,496	+1.22%
1891	42,004	−0.12%
1901	49,491	+1.65%
1911	53,944	+0.87%
1921	55,503	+0.29%
1951	77,026	+1.10%

Year	Pop.	±% p.a.
1961	103,216	+2.97%
1972	158,781	+3.99%
1981	190,551	+2.05%
1998	335,551	+3.38%
2017	551,357	+2.65%
2023	563,851	+0.37%

Sukkur is the third largest city in Sindh after Karachi and Hyderabad. The population of Sukkur is 563,851, according to the 2023 Census of Pakistan.

=== Religion ===
Roughly 96% population of the city is Muslim, while the remaining 4% comprise other minorities, overwhelmingly Hindus.

Religious groups in Sukkur City (1881−2023)
Religious group	1881		1891		1901		1911		1921		1931		1941		2017		2023	
Religious group	Pop.	%	Pop.	%	Pop.	%	Pop.	%	Pop.	%	Pop.	%	Pop.	%	Pop.	%	Pop.	%
Islam	14,118	51.55%	11,866	40.5%	11,386	36.36%	13,253	37.55%	16,329	38.19%	27,642	39.9%	18,152	27.31%	486,710	95.8%	544,308	95.63%
Hinduism (Note: Includes Castes (Hindu Jati), Scheduled Castes, Scheduled Castes and Scheduled Tribes/Tribals, Nanakpanthis, Prarthana Samaj, and Brahmoism.)	12,838	46.87%	16,945	57.83%	19,313	61.67%	21,392	60.61%	25,368	59.33%	38,890	56.14%	46,467	69.91%	18,645	3.67%	21,322	3.75%
Christianity	383	1.4%	423	1.44%	339	1.08%	163	0.46%	302	0.71%	525	0.76%	353	0.53%	2,176	0.43%	3,095	0.54%
Zoroastrianism	50	0.18%	54	0.18%	54	0.17%	74	0.21%	101	0.24%	111	0.16%	53	0.08%	—N/a	—N/a	0	0%
Judaism	0	0%	14	0.05%	13	0.04%	0	0%	0	0%	8	0.01%	8	0.01%	—N/a	—N/a	—N/a	—N/a
Jainism	0	0%	0	0%	0	0%	3	0.01%	9	0.02%	0	0%	0	0%	—N/a	—N/a	—N/a	—N/a
Buddhism	0	0%	0	0%	0	0%	0	0%	0	0%	0	0%	0	0%	—N/a	—N/a	—N/a	—N/a
Sikhism	—N/a	—N/a	—N/a	—N/a	—N/a	—N/a	409	1.16%	650	1.52%	2,094	3.02%	1,433	2.16%	—N/a	—N/a	225	0.04%
Ahmadiyya	—N/a	—N/a	—N/a	—N/a	—N/a	—N/a	—N/a	—N/a	—N/a	—N/a	—N/a	—N/a	—N/a	—N/a	13	0%	12	0%
Others	0	0%	0	0%	211	0.67%	0	0%	0	0%	7	0.01%	0	0%	486	0.1%	190	0.03%
Total population	27,389	100%	29,302	100%	31,316	100%	35,294	100%	42,759	100%	69,277	100%	66,466	100%	508,030	100%	569,152	100%
1881–1941: Data for the entirety of the town of Sukkur, which included Sukkur Municipality. 2017–2023: Urban populations of New Sukkur Taluka and Sukkur City Taluka.

=== Languages ===
Languages of Sukkur City Taluka, New Sukkur Taluka and Rohri Municipal corporation (2023)
1. Sindhi (75.0%)
2. Urdu (17.1%)
3. Punjabi (2.60%)
4. Saraiki (1.30%)
5. Balochi (1.10%)
6. Pashto (1.00%)
7. Others (2.70%)

Around 75% of the population speaks Sindhi as a first language, while 17.1% of the population speak Urdu, 2.6%Punjabi, 1.3% Saraiki, 1.1% Balochi and an additional 2.21% of the total Population spoke a multitude of languages (mostly Pashto and Brahvi) and Hindko. (Note: Data includes Sukkur City Taluka and urban part of New Sukkur Taluka)

== Economy ==
Sukkur's economy is largely reliant upon the agricultural produce from northern Sindh's farms, and serves as a trading and processing center for agricultural goods.

Sukkur's economy relies heavily on agriculture and related processing, but also features industrial activity. The Sindh Industrial Trading Estate (SITE) Sukkur, established in 1963, covers approximately 1,060 acres and hosts over 100 units, primarily agro-based industries such as cotton ginning, vegetable oil and ghee mills, flour mills, biscuits (e.g., Continental Biscuits/LU), and beverages (e.g., PepsiCo). A smaller Small Industries Estate (SIE) spans 110 acres. These estates support manufacturing, employment, and trade in northern Sindh. The city also once had a bustling shipbuilding industry.

Sukkur is well-connected to the rest of Pakistan by road and rail, which in turn has attracted new industries such as chemical manufacturing, metalworking, and cement manufacturing.

=== Agriculture ===
Sukkur has a large fertile and cultivable land area. During kharif, rice, bajra, cotton, tomatoes and peas are cultivated, whereas during rabi, the main crops are wheat, barley, graham and melons. Sukkur is famous world over for its dates. Sukkur also has a large riverine forest along the course of the Indus. These tropical forests are found within the protective embankments on either side of the Indus. During 1997–98, the total area under forests was 510 km^{2} (200 sq mi) which yielded 55,000 cubic feet (1,600 m^{3}) of timber and 27,000 cubic feet (760 m^{3}) of firewood besides other mine products.

== Transportation ==
=== Road ===
The city is connected to Multan by M-5 motorway, with onwards motorway connections to Lahore, Islamabad, and Peshawar. Sukkur will also be connected to Hyderabad by the M-6 motorway, with onwards connections to Karachi via the M-9 motorway. The M-5 is ready whereas the M-6 is being built as part of the wider China-Pakistan Economic Corridor.

=== Rail ===
Sukkur railway station serves as the city's main rail station. Passenger services are provided exclusively by Pakistan Railways. The city's station is serviced by the Jaffar Express that runs between Rawalpindi and Quetta, the Sukkur Express that runs between Karachi and Jacobabad, and the Akbar Express that runs between Quetta and Peshawar.

=== Air ===
Sukkur Airport, located 8 km outside of the city, is served by Pakistan International Airlines, with direct flights to Karachi, Lahore, and Islamabad.

== Administration ==
The city of Sukkur is the capital of Sukkur Division and Sukkur District. Sukkur District has four Tehsils (Talukas) and many Union Councils. Sukkur is home to one of three circuit benches of the Sindh High Court.

== Education ==
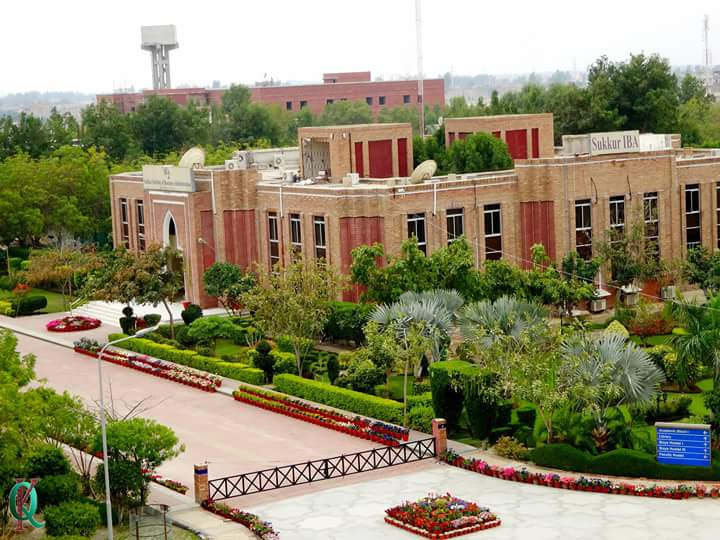
The Sukkur IBA University is one of Pakistan's business schools.

The Sukkur IBA University (previously Sukkur Institute of Business Administration or Sukkur IBA) is a business school founded in 1994. The institute is ranked 3rd among the five independent business schools of Pakistan included in the Higher Education Commission Pakistan Business School Ranking 2013.

Begum Nusrat Bhutto Women University is the public sector University exclusively for women. Established on 50 Acre of land at the Rohri Bypass N-5 National Highway

The Ghulam Muhammad Mahar Medical College is a constituent College of Shaheed Mohtarma Benazir Bhutto Medical University.

The Aror University of Art, Architecture, Design and Heritages is established near Sukkur at Rohri bypass N-5 National Highway. The university is offering the graduate, postgraduate an advance studies in the field of architecture, textile design, photography, interior design, civil engineering, communication design, ceramics and other disciplines.

Islamia Science College Sukkur was founded by the Syed Hasan Mian Advocate and he remained the Chief Patron of the college till his death, Syed Hasan Mian advocate with the help of Noble families of Sukkur founded 25 Schools and Vocational centers in Sukkur. He was the General Sec of All India Muslim League and close associate of Founder of Pakistan Quaid e Azam Mohammad Ali Jinnah.

Ziauddin University Sukkur Campus

== Notable people ==
- Mir Muhammad Masum Nami (d. 1606), born to Shaikh-ul-Islam of Bhakkar of that time. He authored Tarikh-i-Masumi (aka Tarikh-i-Sind), a book on history of the Sindh province from the start of Muhammad Bin Qasim's arrival in Sindh to the beginning of 17th century. Mufradat-i-Nami was book written on medicine by him. He wrote a Diwan of poetry and versified the translation of legend of Sassi Pannu.
- Hemu Kalani, Indian revolutionary
- Sardar Ghulam Muhammad Khan Mahar
- Syed Nasir Hussain Shah
- Abdul Hafeez Pirzada
- Syed Khurshid Shah, Leader of Opposition for National Assembly of Pakistan from June 2013 to May 2018
- Islam Ud Din Shaikh, Member of Senate of Pakistan since March 2015
- Nouman Islam Shaikh, Member National Assembly of Pakistan, NA-207 (Sukkur-II), NA-198 (Sukkur-cum-Shikarpur-I)
- Dr Sana Ramchand Gulwani, first female Hindu civil servant from Pakistan Administrative Service

== See also ==
- Alor and Arora
- Ghulam Muhammad Mahar Medical College
- List of educational institutions in Sukkur
- Sukkur IBA University
- Begum Nusrat Bhutto Women University
- Aror University of Art, Architecture, Design and Heritages

== Bibliography ==
- Dirk Collier (1 March 2016), The Great Mughals and their India, Hay House, Inc., p. 207, ISBN 978-9-38-454498-0
- James Wynbrandt (2009), A Brief History of Pakistan, Infobase Publishing, p. 71, ISBN 978-0-81-606184-6
