= Lakhan-Jo-Daro =

Ancient ruins in Sukkur, Sindh

Lakhan-jo-daro is an archeological site and one of the largest cities of the Indus Valley civilization. It is located within an industrial zone on the outskirts of the modern city of Sukkur and situated at the distance of mere 75 kilometers from another major city of its contemporary era, Mohenjo Daro. It covers an expanse of more than 300 hectares.

== Excavation ==
The site, located in Sukkur District (around 100 km away from the Mohenjo-daro site) on the right bank of the Indus River was first discovered in 1985 by Prof Qasid Mallah and his team from Khairpur University. It was excavated in 2006 by the archeologists and students of Shah Abdul Latif University. Excavations were also undertaken by Prof. Muhammad Mukhtiar Kazi of University of Sindh during 1996 and 2000. According to Dr. Mark Kenoyer, it covers an area of more than 300 hectares, as large as Mohenjo Daro (250 Ha) and was the second largest city of the Indus Valley civilization.

== Historical significance ==
Lakhueen-jo-daro is located near Sukkur. Material cultural finds of this site indicate that it predates Mature Harappan period. It covers a large area in the form of few mounds.

A radiocarbon date obtained from a charcoal sample collected from the same trial trench opened in mound "C" from which samples were taken by the Italian archaeological mission in Sindh in 1997, and the bronze figurine was found by the same mission, confirm the datation of this part of the site (GrN-23123: 3960+/-140 BP; 2478+/-215 cal BC at 1 sigma)(see Biagi and Starnini 2021)

== See also ==
- Mohenjo Daro
