= Pakistan Council for Architects and Town Planners =

Governmental regulatory authority

- Abbreviation: PCATP
- Formation: 1983
- Type: Governmental organization
- Headquarters: Islamabad, Pakistan
- Region served: Pakistan
- Official language: Urdu and English
- Key people: Ejaz Ahmed Qadri (chairman)
- Affiliations: Ministry of Housing and Works (Pakistan) and Higher Education Commission of Pakistan
- Website: pcatp.org.pk

The Pakistan Council of Architects and Town Planners (abbreviated as PCATP), (Urdu: کونسلِ پاکستان برائے مہندسان و کشوری منصوبہ ساز) established in 1983, is a federal regulatory authority for architects and town planners based in Pakistan. Its headquarters is located in Islamabad.

The Pakistan Council of Architects and Town Planners Ordinance 1983 was promulgated with a view to give recognition and protection to the profession of architecture and town planning in Pakistan. The council has wide-ranging powers and is authorized to perform all functions and to take steps connected with or ancillary to all aspects of the two professions including drawing up standards of conduct, safeguarding interests of its members, assisting the government and national institutions in solving national problems related to the professions, promotion of reforms in the professions, promotion of education of these professions, reviewing and advising the government in the matter of architecture and town planning education, etc.

In March 2025, Ejaz Ahmed Qadri was elected as the new chairman of the organization.

== New Executive Members are ==
'Ejaz Ahmed Qadri Chairman'

1. Shazia Abro Vice Chairperson (Architecture)
2. Ghulam Sarwar Sandhu Vice Chairman (TOWN PLANNING)

Executive Members Architecture are: '

1. Mohsin Razzaq Mughal' (Federal Capital)
2. Hassan Jamil (Punjab)
3. Tahir Saeed (KPK)
4. Faryal Sikandar (Sindh)
5. Mahjabeen (Balochistan)
6. Zeeshan Ashraf (Floating)

'Member Town Planning are'

1. Tayyab Mussadiq
2. Fiaz Farooq
3. Dr. Fahad Ahmed Shaikh
4. Abdul Waheed.
5. Prof.Ijaz Ahmad

Pakistan Council for Architects and Town Planners (PCATP) is a regulatory authority and acts as an accreditation council of Higher Education Commission of Pakistan.

As per PCATP Bye Laws, Scope of Work of AN Architect

1. Preparation of feasibility and other reports,
2. The production of concept,layouts Design of buildings
3. The originating, designing and planning,
4. Producing working drawings
5. Prepare contract documents,
6. Prepare specifications and bills of quantities,
7. Inspection and supervision of Town planning work

Scope of Work of Town Planner

- carrying out of physical and socioeconomic surveys,
- the preparation of feasibility reports,
- layout plans of Town Planning, and development plans
- inspection and supervision of Town Planning works
- and issue of certificates of such schemes and works for which a town planner offers his professional services.
