= First ladies and gentlemen of Pakistan =

First Lady of Pakistan
- Flag of Pakistan
- Incumbent; Aseefa Bhutto (daughter of Asif Zardari); Nusrat Shehbaz (wife of Shehbaz Sharif); Tehmina Durrani (wife of Shehbaz Sharif) since 16 April 2024 (Aseefa); 4 March 2024 (Nusrat and Tehmina)
- Term length: 5 years
- Inaugural holder: Naheed Begum; Ra'ana Liaquat Ali Khan

First ladies and gentlemen of Pakistan (Urdu: خاتون اول يا مرد اول پاكستان) is an unofficial title traditionally given, often interchangeably, to the wife or husband of the president and prime minister of Pakistan. The current position First Ladies of Pakistan is Aseefa Bhutto Zardari, daughter of the former Prime Minister Benazir Bhutto and the current president Asif Ali Zardari. Along with their spouse and children, the First Lady or Gentleman is a member of the First Family of Pakistan.

== Consorts, first ladies and first gentlemen ==
=== List of consorts (monarchs of Pakistan – position abolished in 1956) ===
No.	Portrait	Consorts	Head of state	Term begins	Term ends
1		Elizabeth Bowes-Lyon	King George VI	15 August 1947	6 February 1952
2		Philip Mountbatten	Queen Elizabeth II	6 February 1952	23 March 1956

=== List of first ladies (governor-generals of Pakistan – position abolished in 1956) ===
No.	Portrait	First Lady	Governor General	Term begins	Term ends	Description
1		Position vacant	Muhammad Ali Jinnah	15 August 1947 –	11 September 1948	Muhammad Ali Jinnah's second wife, Rattanbai Jinnah, died in 1929. He never remarried.
–		Position vacant		11 September 1948	14 September 1948	No Governor General during this time.
2		Shah Bano	Sir Khawaja Nazimuddin	14 September 1948	17 October 1951	
3		Badshah Begum	Sir Ghulam Muhammad	17 October 1951	7 August 1955	
4		Nahid Mirza	Iskandar Mirza	7 August 1955	23 March 1956	Born Nahid Afghamy in Iran. Nahid married Mirza in July 1953. She died on January 25, 2019.

=== List of first ladies and gentlemen of Pakistan (head of state – president of Pakistan) ===
No.	Portrait	First Lady	Head of state	Tenure begins	Tenure ends	Notes
1		Nahid Mirza	Iskandar Mirza	23 March 1956	27 October 1958	Nahid, who was Iranian-born and of Iranian Kurdish descent was a cousin of fellow First Lady Nusrat Bhutto. Nahid died on January 25, 2019.
2		Begum Ayub Khan	Ayub Khan	27 October 1958	25 March 1969	
3		Name unavailable	Mohammad Afzal Cheema (Acting)	11 June 1962	29 November 1963	
4		Syeda Selima Begum	Fazlul Qadir Chaudhry (Acting)	29 November 1963	12 June 1965	
5		Begum Ayub Khan	Ayub Khan (2nd Tenure)	12 June 1965	25 March 1969	
–		Fakhra Khan	Yahya Khan	25 March 1969	20 December 1971	
6		Shireen Amir Begum	Zulfikar Ali Bhutto	20 December 1971	13 August 1973	
6		Nusrat Bhutto	Zulfikar Ali Bhutto	20 December 1971	13 August 1973	Nusrat Bhutto was born in Iran into the Ispahani family, a prominent Iranian Kurdish family. She was the cousin of former First Lady Nahid Mirza. The wife of Zulfikar Ali Bhutto and mother of Benazir Bhutto, she founded the Movement for the Restoration of Democracy in 1981 in opposition to oppose Muhammad Zia-ul-Haq's regime.
7		Name unavailable	Fazal Ilahi Chaudhry	14 August 1973	20 April 1978	
8		Name unavailable	Sheikh Anwarul Haq (Acting)	20 April 1978	7 May 1978	
9		Name unavailable	Fazal Ilahi Chaudhry	7 May 1978	16 September 1978	
10	Begum Zia ul Haq]	Shafiq Jahan	Muhammad Zia-ul-Haq	16 September 1978	17 August 1988	Born in Uganda to a family of Indian origin before immigrating to Pakistan.
11		Begum Shamim Khan	Ghulam Ishaq Khan	17 August 1988	18 July 1993	Begum Shamim Khan died on July 26, 2019, in Peshawar at the age of 83.
12		Azra Sarfraz Sajjad	Wasim Sajjad (Acting)	18 July 1993	14 November 1993	
13		Name unavailable	Farooq Leghari	14 November 1993	2 December 1997	
14		Azra Sarfraz Sajjad	Wasim Sajjad (Acting)	2 December 1997	1 January 1998	
15		Shamim Akhtar	Muhammad Rafiq Tarar	1 January 1998	20 June 2001	Tarrar's wife died on 11 August 2020.
16		Sehba Musharraf	Pervez Musharraf	20 June 2001	18 August 2008	
17		Khadijah Soomro	Muhammad Mian Soomro (Acting)	18 August 2008	9 September 2008	
–		Position vacant	Asif Ali Zardari	9 September 2008	9 September 2013	Zardari's wife, former Prime Minister Benazir Bhutto, had been assassinated in 2007.
18		Begum Mehmooda Hussain	Mamnoon Hussain	9 September 2013	9 September 2018	
19		Samina Alvi	Arif Alvi	9 September 2018	10 March 2024	
20		Aseefa Bhutto Zardari	Asif Ali Zardari	16 April 2024	Incumbent	A first lady is the typically the president's wife, however, in this case, President Zardari is a widower after his wife, former prime minister Benazir Bhutto, was martyred in 2007, leading to Aseefa being nominated despite being his daughter, confirmed by party information secretary Kundi.

=== Spouse of the prime minister of Pakistan ===
No.	Portrait	First Lady/Gentleman	Prime Minister	Term begins	Terms ends	Notes
1		Ra'ana Liaquat Ali Khan	Liaquat Ali Khan	14 August 1947	16 October 1951	Later served as the Governor of Sindh from 1973 to 1976.
–		Position vacant		16 October 1951	17 October 1951	No Prime Minister during this time.
2		Shah Bano	Khawaja Nazimuddin	17 October 1951	17 April 1953	
3		Hamida Ali	Mohammad Ali Bogra	17 April 1953	12 August 1955	Bogra was married twice. His first marriage from Hamida Mohammad Ali who is the former member of national assembly of Pakistan while his second marriage is from Aliya Begum, a Labanese national.
3		Aliya Begum	Mohammad Ali Bogra	17 April 1953	12 August 1955	Bogra was married twice. His first marriage from Hamida Mohammad Ali who is the former member of national assembly of Pakistan while his second marriage is from Aliya Begum, a Labanese national.
4		Name unavailable	Chaudhry Muhammad Ali	12 August 1955	12 September 1956	
5		Position vacant	Huseyn Shaheed Suhrawardy	12 September 1956	17 October 1957	Suharwardy was also married twice. His first spouse Begum Niaz Fatima died in 1922 from whom he married in 1920 while his second spouse Vera Alexandrovna was a Russian actress of Polish descent from whom he married in 1940 but later divorced in 1951.
6		Begum Hailma	I. I. Chundrigar	17 October 1957	16 December 1957	Chundrigar was married to Begum Halima. He had five children with her.
7		Viqar un Nisa Noon	Feroz Khan Noon	16 December 1957	7 October 1958	Born Victoria in Austria, she married Feroz Khan Noon in 1945.
–		Position vacant		7 October 1958	7 December 1971	No prime minister or first lady during this time after 1958 Pakistani coup d'état.
8		Name unavailable	Nurul Amin	7 December 1971	20 December 1971	
–		Position vacant		20 December 1971	14 August 1973	No Prime Minister during this time.
9		Shireen Amir Begum	Zulfikar Ali Bhutto	14 August 1973	5 July 1977	
9		Nusrat Bhutto	Zulfikar Ali Bhutto	14 August 1973	5 July 1977	Bhutto, the mother of Benazir Bhutto and matriarch of the Bhutto family, founded the Movement for the Restoration of Democracy in 1981 in opposition to Muhammad Zia-ul-Haq's regime. She led the Pakistan People's Party during the 1980s and was elected to parliament twice. Nusrat Bhutto died on October 23, 2011.
–		Position vacant		5 July 1977	24 March 1985	No prime minister or first lady during this time. The office of prime minister was abolished by the Zia regime.
10		Begum Junejo	Muhammad Khan Junejo	24 March 1985	29 May 1988	Begum Junejo died in Karachi on July 13, 2003, at the age of 60. Her funeral was attended by thousands of people. During his political career, The Independent described Prime Minister Junejo as a "strict disciplinarian and a conservative Muslim who kept his wife at his village home and never allowed her to join him in public."
–		Position vacant		29 May 1988	2 December 1988	No Prime Minister during this time.
11		Asif Ali Zardari	Benazir Bhutto	2 December 1988	6 August 1990	
12		Name unavailable	Ghulam Mustafa Jatoi (caretaker)	6 August 1990	6 November 1990	Jatoi was first Caretaker Prime Minister of Pakistan. He was married from whom he has two sons Ghulam Murtaza Jatoi and Arif Mustafa Jatoi.
13		Kulsoom Nawaz	Nawaz Sharif	6 November 1990	18 April 1993	
14		Name unavailable	Balakh Sher Mazari (caretaker)	18 April 1993	26 May 1993	
–		Kulsoom Nawaz	Nawaz Sharif	26 May 1993	18 July 1993	Mazari's tenure as caretaker prime minister ended abruptly on 26 May 1993 when the Supreme Court revoked the presidential order and reinstated Nawaz Sharif as the prime minister.
15		Lilo Elizabeth Richter	Moeenuddin Ahmad Qureshi (caretaker)	18 July 1993	18 October 1993	
16		Asif Ali Zardari	Benazir Bhutto (2nd Tenure)	18 October 1993	5 November 1996	
17		Name unavailable	Malik Meraj Khalid (caretaker)	5 November 1996	17 February 1997	Khalid was married.
18		Kulsoom Nawaz	Nawaz Sharif (2nd Tenure)	17 February 1997	12 October 1999	
–		Position vacant		12 October 1999	23 November 2002	No Prime Minister during this time.
19		Name unavailable	Zafarullah Khan Jamal	23 November 2002	26 June 2004	
–		Position vacant		26 June 2004	30 June 2004	No Prime Minister during this time.
20		Name unavailable	Chaudhry Shujaat Hussain	30 June 2004	23 August 2004	Hussain is married and has three children including Chaudhry Salik Hussain.
–		Position vacant		23 August 2004	28 August 2004	No Prime Minister during this time.
21		Rukhsana Aziz	Shaukat Aziz	28 August 2004	15 November 2007	
–		Position vacant		15 November 2007	16 November 2007	No Prime Minister during this time.
22		Khadijah Soomro	Muhammad Mian Soomro (caretaker)	16 November 2007	24 March 2008	
–		Position vacant		24 March 2008	25 March 2008	No Prime Minister during this time.
23		Fauzia Gillani	Yousuf Raza Gillani	25 March 2008	19 June 2012	
24		Nusrat Pervaiz Ashraf	Raja Pervaiz Ashraf	22 June 2012	25 March 2013	
25		Name unavailable	Mir Hazar Khan Khoso (caretaker)	25 March 2013	5 June 2013	
26		Kulsoom Nawaz	Nawaz Sharif (3rd Tenure)	5 June 2013	28 July 2017	
–		Position vacant		28 July 2017	1 August 2017	No Prime Minister during this time.
27		Samina Shahid Abbasi	Shahid Khaqan Abbasi	1 August 2017	31 May 2018	
–		Position vacant		31 May 2018	1 June 2018	No Prime Minister during this time.
28		Name unavailable	Nasirul Mulk (caretaker)	1 June 2018	18 August 2018	Mulk is married.
29		Bushra Bibi	Imran Khan	18 August 2018	10 April 2022	Bushra Bibi is reportedly the country's first first lady to wear a facial veil. Bibi and Imran Khan married in February 2018, just a few months before he became prime minister, following their divorces from their previous spouses.
–		Position vacant		10 April 2022	11 April 2022	No Prime Minister during this time.
30		Nusrat Shehbaz	Shehbaz Sharif	11 April 2022	13 August 2023	
30		Tehmina Durrani	Shehbaz Sharif	11 April 2022	13 August 2023	
31		Name unavailable	Anwar ul Haq Kakar (caretaker)	14 August 2023	4 March 2024	
32		Nusrat Shehbaz	Shehbaz Sharif (2nd Tenure)	4 March 2024	Present	
32		Tehmina Durrani	Shehbaz Sharif (2nd Tenure)	4 March 2024	Present	

== See also ==
- Family of head of state and government in Pakistan
