= Rohri =

Rohri روہڑی روهڙي
- City
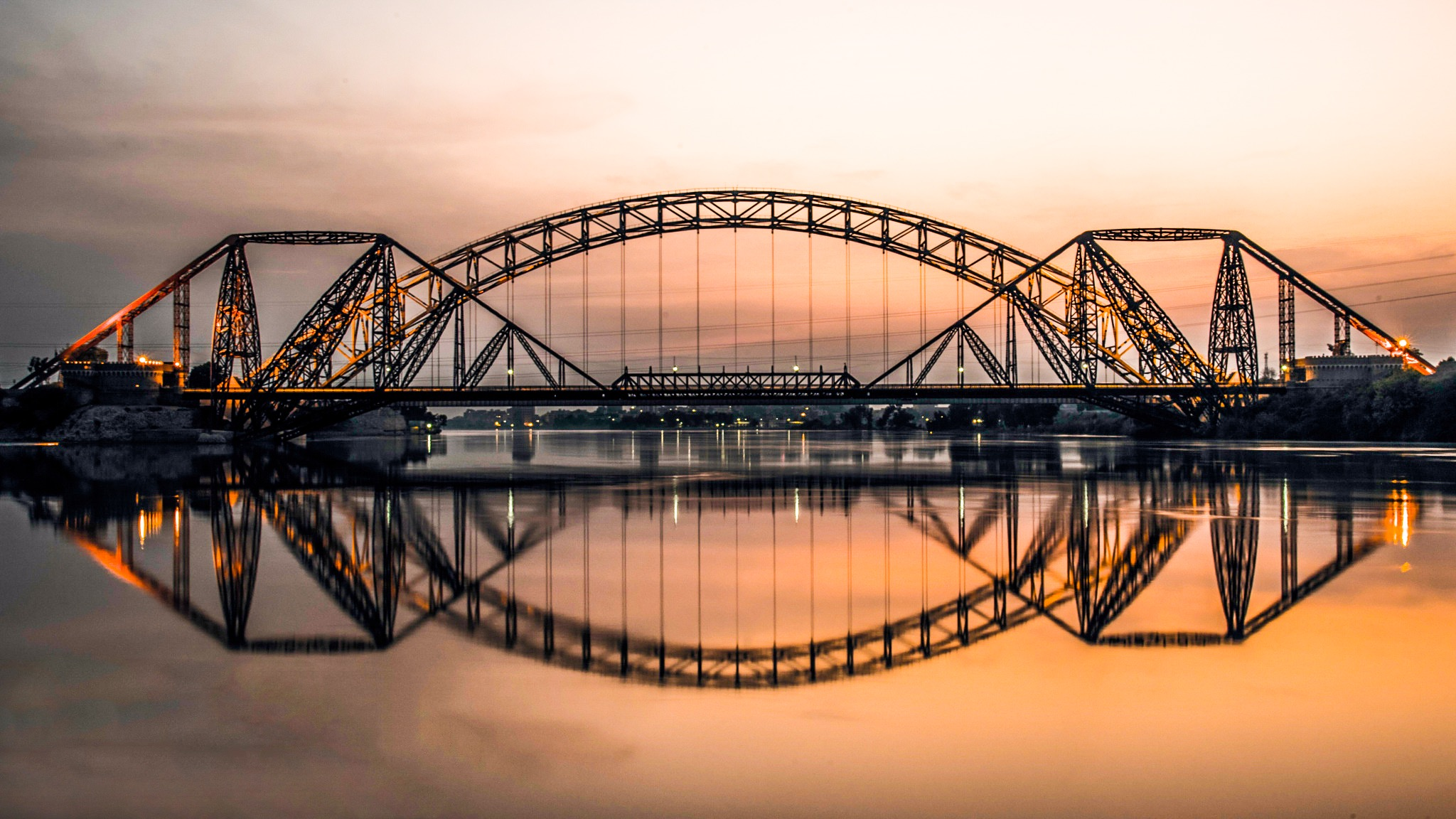
- View of the famous British-era Lansdowne Bridge, and Ayub Bridge, which both span the Indus River and offer access between Rohri and Sukkur

- Location within Sindh Location within Pakistan
- Coordinates: 27°40′59″N 68°54′00″E
- Country: Pakistan
- Province: Sindh
- Division: Sukkur
- District: Sukkur

Government
  - Type: Municipal Committee
  - Chairman: Yaqoob Ali Shah
  - Vice-Chairman: Muhammad Aslam Memon
- Elevation: 62 m (203 ft)

Population (2023 census)
  - City: 92,135
  - Rank: 138th in Pakistan
- Time zone: UTC+5 (PST)

Rohri (Sindhi: روهڙي; Urdu: روہڑی) is a city of Sukkur District, Sindh province, Pakistan. It is located on the east bank of the Indus River, directly across from Sukkur, the third most populous city in Sindh. Rohri town is the administrative headquarters of Rohri Taluka, and a tehsil of Sukkur District with which it forms a metropolitan area. Its capture marked the beginning of Muslim rule in India under Muhammad ibn al-Qasim in 711 CE, when it was named Aror.

== History ==
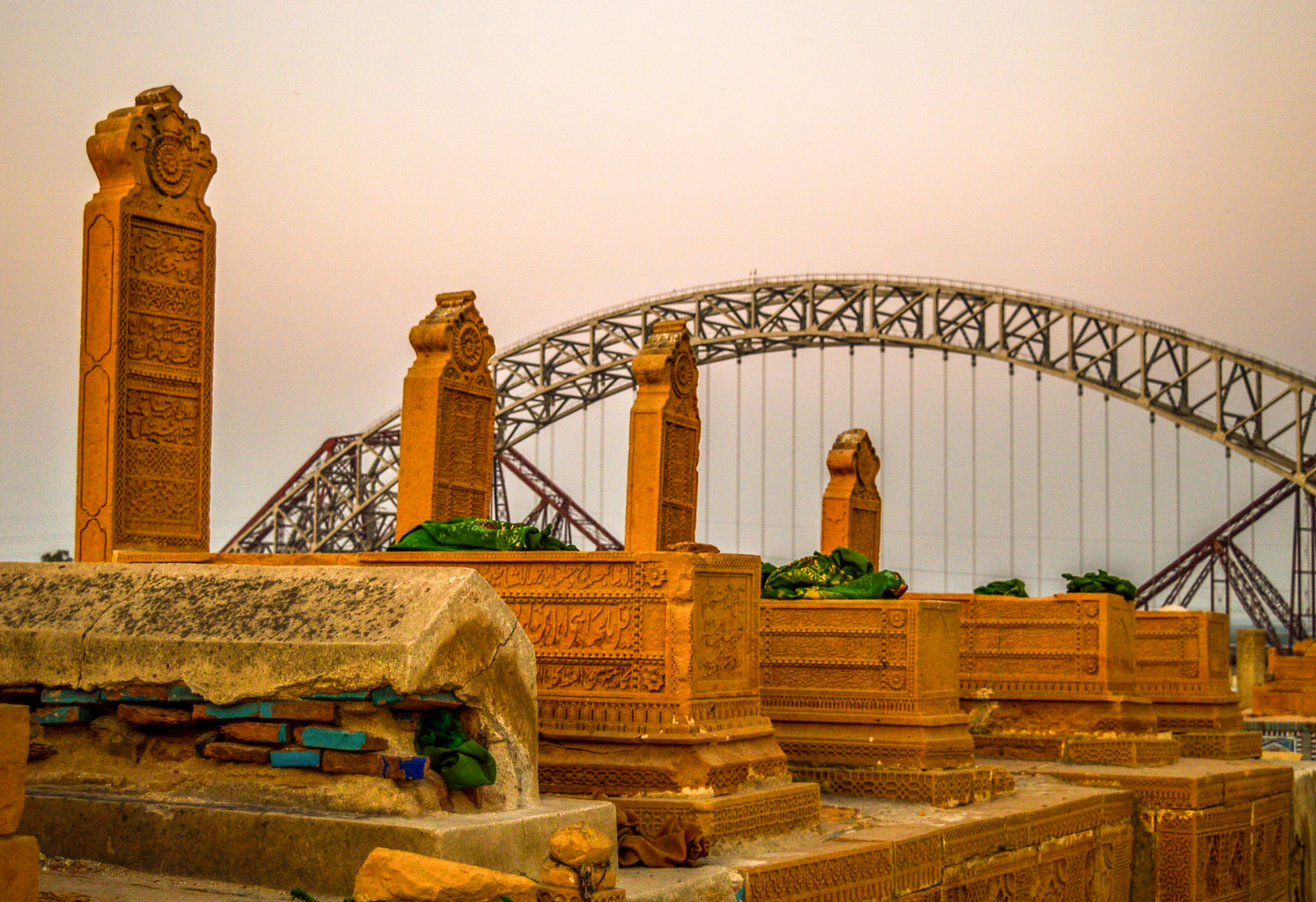
The Sateen Jo Aastan shrine in Rohri

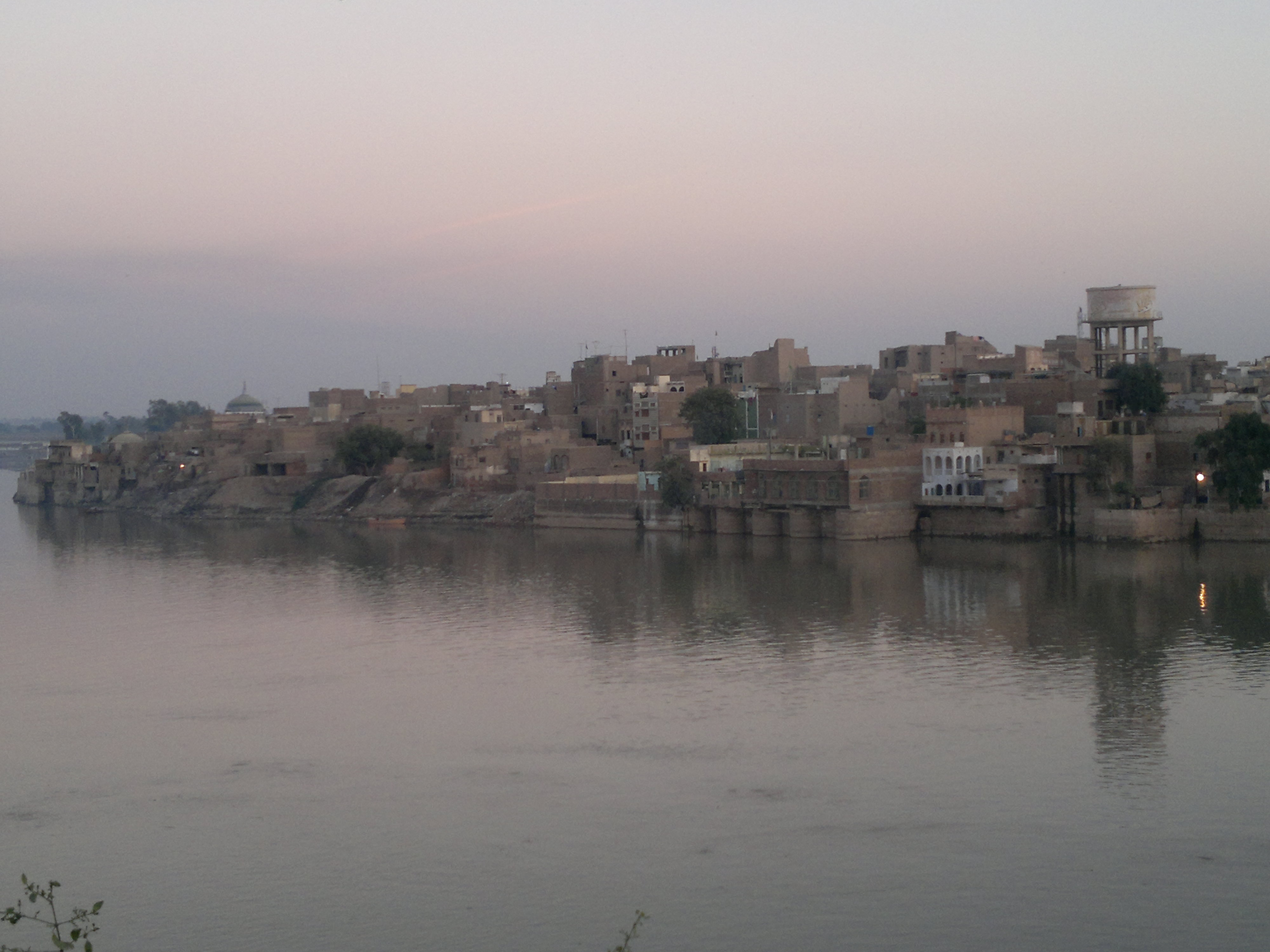
View of the city from Bakkar Island

Rohri is 10 kilometres (6.2 miles) west of the ancient city of Aror. Roruka, as capital of the Sauvira Kingdom, is mentioned as an important trading center in early Buddhist literature. Little is known about the city's history prior to the Arab invasion in the eighth century, but Aror was the capital of the Rai dynasty and then the Brahman dynasty that once ruled northern Sindh.

In 711 CE, Aror was captured by the army of Muslim general Muhammad bin Qasim. In 962 CE, a massive earthquake struck the region, causing the course of the Indus River to shift. Aror was re-founded as Rohri afterwards.

Rohri served as a busy port along the Indus by the 1200s, and was a major trading centre for agricultural produce.

== Demographics ==
Population

Historical population
Year	Pop.	±%
1972	26,818	—
1981	31,332	+16.8%
1998	45,731	+46.0%
2017	69,944	+52.9%
2023	92,135	+31.7%

According to the 2023 census, Rohri had a population of 92,135.

Languages

Languages of Rohri MC (2023 Census)
1. Sindhi (87.6%)
2. Urdu (7.30%)
3. Punjabi (1.60%)
4. Pashto (1.50%)
5. Balochi (0.90%)
6. Others (1.10%)

== Climate ==
Rohri has a hot desert climate (Köppen climate classification BWh) with extremely hot summers and mild winters. Rohri is very dry, with the little rain it receives mostly falling in the monsoon season from July to September. The average annual rainfall of Rohri is 105.8 mm as per 1991-2020 period. The highest annual rainfall ever is 669.4 mm, recorded in 2022 and the lowest annual rainfall ever is 0 mm as it was a record dry period in the city in 1941.

Climate data for Rohri
Month	Jan	Feb	Mar	Apr	May	Jun	Jul	Aug	Sep	Oct	Nov	Dec	Year
Record high °C (°F)	30.6 (87.1)	37.2 (99.0)	42.2 (108.0)	47.0 (116.6)	49.0 (120.2)	51.0 (123.8)	47.0 (116.6)	47.0 (116.6)	43.3 (109.9)	43.3 (109.9)	38.0 (100.4)	31.1 (88.0)	51.0 (123.8)
Mean daily maximum °C (°F)	22.8 (73.0)	25.3 (77.5)	31.2 (88.2)	37.6 (99.7)	42.4 (108.3)	43.6 (110.5)	40.8 (105.4)	38.7 (101.7)	38.0 (100.4)	35.3 (95.5)	29.9 (85.8)	24.0 (75.2)	34.1 (93.4)
Daily mean °C (°F)	15.6 (60.1)	18.1 (64.6)	23.8 (74.8)	29.8 (85.6)	34.3 (93.7)	36.0 (96.8)	34.4 (93.9)	32.7 (90.9)	31.4 (88.5)	27.8 (82.0)	22.5 (72.5)	16.8 (62.2)	26.9 (80.5)
Mean daily minimum °C (°F)	8.4 (47.1)	10.9 (51.6)	16.4 (61.5)	22.0 (71.6)	26.2 (79.2)	28.4 (83.1)	27.9 (82.2)	26.7 (80.1)	24.9 (76.8)	20.3 (68.5)	14.4 (57.9)	9.6 (49.3)	19.7 (67.4)
Record low °C (°F)	1.7 (35.1)	1.0 (33.8)	5.0 (41.0)	10.0 (50.0)	16.0 (60.8)	19.0 (66.2)	17.5 (63.5)	17.5 (63.5)	16.5 (61.7)	9.5 (49.1)	5.5 (41.9)	−1.5 (29.3)	−1.5 (29.3)
Average precipitation mm (inches)	3.5 (0.14)	8.0 (0.31)	5.7 (0.22)	1.5 (0.06)	4.0 (0.16)	4.3 (0.17)	25.7 (1.01)	19.8 (0.78)	10.0 (0.39)	1.3 (0.05)	0.6 (0.02)	3.8 (0.15)	88.2 (3.46)
Source: NOAA (1961-1990)
