= Aror =

Historical capital of Sindh, Pakistan

- Location within Sindh Location within Pakistan
- 27.65°N 68.9833°E
- Type: Settlement
- Location: Sukkur District, Sindh, Pakistan

History
- Abandoned: 9th century AD

Aror (or Alor or Arorkot) is the medieval name of the city of Rohri in Sindh, modern Pakistan. Aror once served as the capital of Sindh.

== History ==
As Roruka, capital of the Sauvira Kingdom, it is mentioned as an important trading center in early Buddhist literature. In the Chachnamah, members of the Brahman group were noted in the city of Aror. Little is known about the city's history prior to the Arab invasion in the 8th century CE. Sauvīra was an ancient kingdom of the lower Indus Valley. Aror was first the capital of the Rai dynasty and after that Brahman dynasty that once ruled northern Sindh.

Aror is the ancestral town of the Arora community. In 711, Aror was captured by the army of Umayyad general Muhammad ibn al-Qasim.

In 962 it was hit by a massive earthquake that changed the course of the Indus River and ruined the town's mud brick building, thereby setting into play the city's decline, and eventual re-settlement at Rohri, along the modern-day shores of the Indus.

== Ruins ==
Most of Aror's ruins have been lost, though some arches of a mosque built shortly after the 8th century Arab invasion remain standing. The Kalka Cave Temple, a Hindu temple dedicated to Kali, exists near the ruins, and is still used. The Chattan Shah ji Takri shrine is built atop a high rock outside the city, and is traditionally believed to be dedicated to a companion of Ali.

== See also ==
- Aror University of Art, Architecture, Design and Heritages
- Muhammad bin Qasim
