= Chandar of Sindh =

Maharaja of Sindh from 671 to 679

Chandra
- Maharaja

Maharaja of Sindh
- Reign: 671–679
- Predecessor: Chach
- Successor: Dahir
- Died: 679
- Dynasty: Chach
- Religion: Hinduism

Chandra or Chandar was a Hindu maharaja of Sindh from the Chach dynasty, who succeeded his brother Chach of Alor at Aror in c. 671 CE, while his nephew Dahirsiya ruled at Brahmanabad. He was described as an ascetic, 'a monk and a devotee', by Chachnama. He died after a brief rule in c. 679 CE, and was succeeded by his another nephew, Raja Dahir at Aror. When his brother Dahirsiya died, Dahir took over Brahmanabad as well.

== Account ==
According to the Chachnama, Chach of Alor was chamberlain and secretary to Rai Sahasi II, the last king of Rai dynasty. Chach ascended to the throne by marrying the king's widow, and appointed Chandar as his deputy. Chandar assisted in the administration of the kingdom during Chach's successful campaigns of expansion, and succeeded Chach upon his death.

After Chach's death, Matta, the ruler of Sehwan, began to conspire against Chandar. Matta had formerly been the autonomous chief of Siwistan; however, he had been subjugated during one of Chach's campaigns, and intended to regain independence. He sent an emissary to Siharas, ruler of Kannauj, noting that Chandar was a monk who allegedly spent his entire day at prayer, and who would thus be a weak foe. He asked Siharas to invade Sindh, and to cede a portion of these lands to Siwistan. Siharas refused, but conceded to Matta's request for a governorship if he succeeded in conquering Sindh. Matta agreed to pay tribute to Siharas in exchange for this post.

Aligned with Chach's grandson, Siharas entered Sindh and besieged Chandar in Alor. During a parley with Sindhi forces, Siharas was seized; he agreed to end the war, sending hostages with robes of honor to Chandar. Chandar eventually formed an alliance with Siharas. Chandar’s reign lasted for seven years, according to the Chach Nama; his nephew Raja Dahir, Chach's eldest son, succeeded him after his death.
