= Matta (chief) =

Mahattah, or Matta, was the chief and later feudatory of Siwistan, in what is now Pakistan. He ruled from Sehwan Sharif, in the Sindh region, in the 7th century CE.

== Life ==
Matta, a member of the Rai dynasty, was chief of Siwistan in what is today Pakistan. He succeeded his father as chief. When Chach of Alor began the expansion of his empire, he entered Siwistan. Matta and a large retinue met Chach's army, and a battle was fought between the opposing factions. Chach defeated Matta and he was forced to flee to his fort. Besieged, his garrison surrendered and, after one week, he sued for peace. Chach, however, appointed Matta as his governor in Siwistan leaving just one of his own officers to oversee the new governmental structure.

After his conquest of Siwistan, Chach called on Agham Lohana, ruler of Brahmanabad, to acknowledge his sovereignty. A short time later, Chach's soldiers seized a messenger bearing letters from Agham to Matta. The correspondence revealed that Matta had decided to defect from Chach's service and was to travel to Brahmanabad, where he would be granted asylum and given a residence. Matta, realizing that his plans had been discovered, fled Siwistan for the safety of Zābul. The tense situation between Alor and Brahmanabad later escalated into war, and Agham was killed in battle.

After Chach's death, Matta approached King Siharas, ruler of Kanauj. The former chief urged Siharas to seize Chach's domains and place them under his control. For this action, Siharas would receive tribute from Matta. Siharas refused, stating that, even if he decided to seize the lands, he would place them under his own rule. However, he agreed to give Matta governorship of part of these conquests. Aligned with Chach's grandson, Siharas's armies invaded the dead ruler's domains (now administered by Chach's brother Chandar), but their campaign ultimately failed, as Chandar continued to sit on the throne. At the end of the campaign, Siharas was captured by Chandar's forces. After the death of Siharas, Matta fled the battlefield towards Balochistan and requested help from the Umayyad Caliphate which controlled the region of Balochistan and western Sindh however due to the harsh terms set by the Umayyads, Matta refused their help and decided to try and take the throne on his own. When he battled Chandar, his forces were no match for the army and he was eventually killed along with most of his army.

== See also ==
- Agham Lohana
- Chach of Alor
- King Siharas
- Sehwan Sharif
