= Battle of Makran =

640 AD battle in Makran, Pakistan

- Part of early Muslim conquests in South Asia
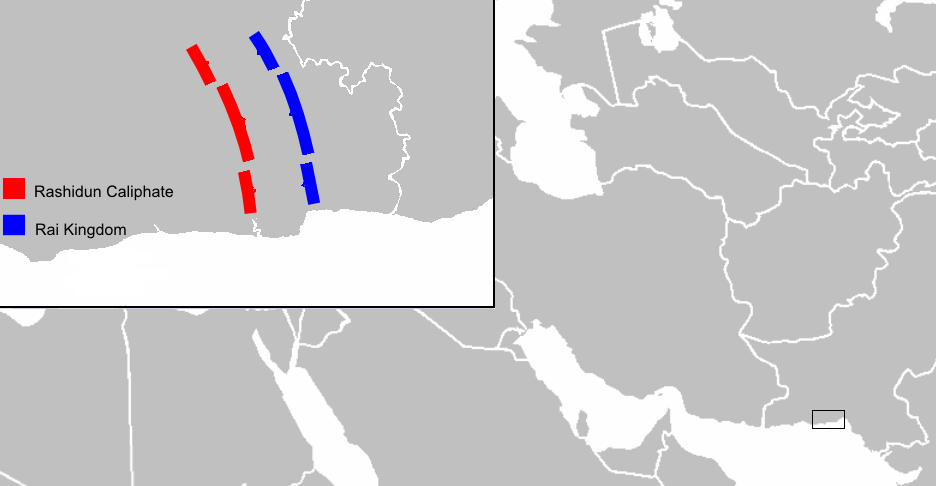
- Map detailing location of Battle field according to present-day geography
Date	644 CE
Location	along the Indus River in Sindh, Pakistan
Result	Rashidun victory
Territorial changes	Makran coast up to Indus and western territories of Chach dynasty annexed by Rashidun Caliphate

Belligerents
Chach dynasty	Rashidun Caliphate

Commanders and leaders
Raja Rasil; Chach of Aror (?)	Suhail ibn Adi; Usman ibn Abi al-'As; Hakam ibn Amr

Strength
Unknown	Unknown

Casualties and losses
Unknown	Unknown

The Battle of Makran was fought between the Rashidun Caliphate and the Chach dynasty of Sindh in 644 CE (23 AH) in contemporary Pakistan. It was the first battle the Muslims fought in the Indian subcontinent. The exact location of the battle is not known, but historians suggest it was fought on the western bank of the River Indus. The 9th century Muslim historian al-Tabari is the main source for the details of the battle. According to him, Rasal or Rasil, the king of Sind, was defeated by the Muslims, and Makran was annexed to the Rashidun Caliphate. The Chachnama names Chach of Aror as the king of Sindh during the time of the conflict and Muslim conquest of Makran.

Suhail ibn Adi was given command of this expedition by Caliph Umar. Suhail marched from Busra in 639. He eventually reached Makran, in contemporary Pakistan. It had been earlier territory of the Rai dynasty but the Sassanids annexed it during the reign of Rai Siharas II. However, Chach of Aror retook it in 631–632.

== Background ==
Before the Muslim raids, Makran was under the Hindu Rais of Sindh, but the region was also shared by the Zunbils. From an early period, parts of it frequently alternated between Indian and Persian control with the Persian portion in the west and the Indian portion in the east. It was later annexed by the Persians from Rai Sahiras II. It was reconquered by the usurper Chach of Alor in 631. Ten years later, it was described to be "under the government of Persia" by Xuanzang who visited the region. Three years later however, when the Arabs invaded, it was regarded as the "frontier of al-Hind".

== Battle ==
Raja Rasil, a local Hindu potentate appointed the Rai of Sindh, concentrated huge armies in Makran to halt the advance of the Muslims. Suhail was reinforced by Uthman ibn Abi al-'As from Persepolis, and Hakam ibn Amr from Busra. The combined forces defeated Raja Rasil at the battle, who retreated to the eastern bank of river Indus. The Raja's army had included war elephants, but these had posed little problem for the Muslim army, who had dealt with them during the conquest of Persia. In accordance with the orders of Caliph Umar, the captured war elephants were sold in Islamic Persia, with the proceeds distributed among the soldiers as share in booty.

Further east from the Indus River laid Sindh, which was the domain of the Chach dynasty. Umar, after learning that Makran was a poor and relatively barren land, disapproved Suhail's proposal to cross the Indus River. For the time being, Umar declared the Indus River, a natural barrier, to be the easternmost frontier of his domain. This campaign came to an end in mid-640.

== Aftermath ==
This was the first confrontation between the Rashidun Caliphate and the Hindu kingdom of Sindh. The victorious Arab army returned to Persia along with booty and a war elephant. In accordance with the orders of Umar, the captured war elephants were sold in Islamic Persia, with the proceeds distributed among the soldiers as share in booty. Caliph Umar, after learning that Baluchistan was a barren land and unfavorable for sending an army, instructed Hakim bin Amr al Taghlibi that for the time being Makran should be the easternmost frontier of the Rashidun Caliphate, and that no further attempt should be made to extend the conquests. This was mainly because of Umar's policy of consolidating the rule before conquering more land. The same year, in 640, Umar had already rejected the proposal by Ahnaf ibn Qais, conqueror of Khurasan, of crossing Oxus River in the north to invade Central Asia. In the west he similarly had called back 'Amr ibn al-'As who had marched to North Africa and had captured Tripoli.

== See also ==
- Muslim conquests
- Muslim conquests on the Indian subcontinent
