= Matta =

Matta may refer to:

== Places ==
- Mata, Israel, a moshav in Israel, southwest of Jerusalem; also spelt Matta
- Matta, Punjab, a Union Council of Kasur District, Pakistan
- Matta, Russia, a village in Megyuryonsky Rural Okrug in the Megino-Kangalassky District in the Sakha Republic
- Matta, Suriname, an indigenous village in Suriname
- Matta (river), a river in the Sakha Republic, Russia
- Matta River (Virginia), United States
- Matta, Swat, a city in Upper Swat, Khyber Pakhtunkhwa, Pakistan, the main centre of TNSM

== People ==
=== Sport ===
- Amanda Matta (born 1995), American television and social media commentator
- Cristiano da Matta (born 1973), Brazilian auto racing driver
- Svein Mathisen (1952–2011), Norwegian footballer with nickname Matta
- Thad Matta (born 1967), American college basketball coach
- Victor Matta (born 1990), Paraguayan football player

=== Other fields ===
- Basheer Matta, Pakistani politician
- Matta (chief), a chief of Siwistan in the 7th century A.D.
- Matta El Meskeen (1919–2006), Coptic Orthodox monk
- Gordon Matta-Clark (1943–1978), American artist
- Liana Fiol Matta (born 1946), Puerto Rican jurist
- Roberto Matta (1911–2002), one of Chile's best-known painters
- Seb Matta (born 2007), American politician
- Urano Teixeira da Matta Bacellar (1947–2006), Brazilian soldier

== Other uses ==
- Matta (restaurant), a Vietnamese restaurant in Portland, Oregon, U.S.
- Matta (spider), a genus of spiders in the family Tetrablemmidae
- Matta rice, a variety of rice grown in the Palakkad District of Kerala, India
- "Matta", an instrumental track from the Brian Eno/Roger Eno/Daniel Lanois album Apollo: Atmospheres and Soundtracks
