= Muslim period in the Indian subcontinent =

Era in South Asia characterized by Muslim rule

The Muslim period in the Indian subcontinent or the Indo-Muslim period is conventionally said to have started in 640 with the conquest of Makran by the Rashidun Caliphate and was continued in 712–714, after the conquest of Sindh and Multan by the Umayyad Caliphate under the military command of Muhammad ibn al-Qasim. It began in the Indian subcontinent in the course of a gradual conquest. The perfunctory rule by the Ghaznavids in Punjab was followed by Ghurids, and Sultan Muhammad of Ghor (r. 1173–1206) is generally credited with laying the foundation of Muslim rule in northern India. Muslim rule in the Indian subcontinent also led to major developments in architecture, including the introduction of Persianate designs, arches, domes, and decorative calligraphy. These styles shaped many of the region's most iconic structures and contributed to the formation of Indo-Islamic architecture.

From the late 12th century onwards, Muslim empires dominated the subcontinent, most notably the Delhi Sultanate and the Mughal Empire. Various other Muslim kingdoms ruled most of South Asia from the mid-14th to late 18th centuries, including the Bahmani, Bengal, Gujarat, Malwa, Kashmir, Multan, Mysore, Carnatic, Arakkal, and the Deccan sultanates. Though the Muslim dynasties in India were diverse in origin, they were linked together by the Persianate culture and the shared faith.

The height of Islamic rule was marked during the reign of Mughal emperor Aurangzeb (r. 1658–1707), during which the Fatawa 'Alamgiri was compiled, which briefly served as the legal system of Mughal Empire. Additional Islamic policies were re-introduced in South India by Mysore's Tipu Sultan.

Shari'a was used as the primary basis for the legal system in the Delhi Sultanate, most notably during the rule of Firuz Shah Tughlaq and Alauddin Khilji, who repelled the Mongol invasions of India. On the other hand, rulers such as Akbar adopted a secular legal system and enforced religious neutrality. Muslim rule in India saw a major shift in the cultural, linguistic, and religious makeup of the subcontinent. Persian and Arabic vocabulary began to enter local languages, giving way to modern Punjabi, Bengali, and Gujarati, while giving rise to new languages, including Hindustani and its dialect, Deccani, used as official languages under Muslim dynasties. This period also saw the birth of Hindustani music and Qawwali. Religions such as Sikhism and Din-e-Ilahi were born out of a fusion of Hindu and Muslim religious traditions as well.

In the 18th century the Islamic influence in India begin to decline following the decline of the Mughal Empire, resulting in former Mughal territory conquered by the rival powers such as the Maratha Empire. However, Islamic rule would still remain under regional nawabs and sultans.

Throughout the 18th and 19th centuries, large parts of India were colonized by the East India Company, eventually establishing the British Raj in 1858. Regional Islamic rule would remain under princely states, such as Hyderabad, Junagadh, Bhopal, Tonk, Rampur and other minor princely states until the mid of the 20th century.

Today, Bangladesh, Maldives and Pakistan are the Muslim majority nations in the Indian subcontinent while India has the largest Muslim minority population in the world numbering over 204 million.

== History ==
=== Early Muslim dominions ===
Local kings who converted to Islam existed in places such as the Western Coastal Plains as early as the 7th century. Islamic rule in India prior to the advent of the Mamluk dynasty of Delhi included those of Arab Caliphate, Ghaznavids and Ghurids.

=== Delhi Sultanate ===
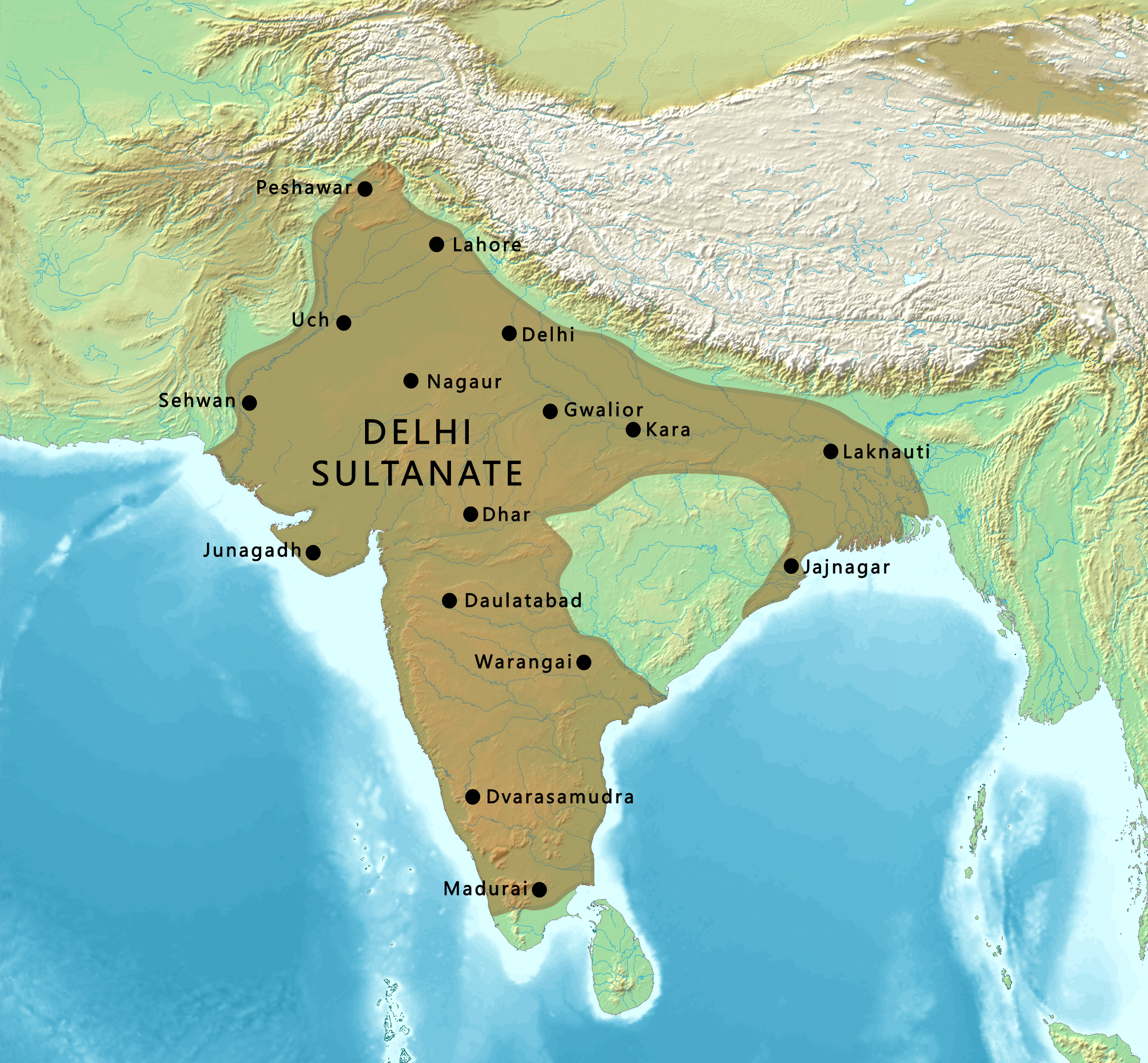
Delhi Sultanate in 1330-1335 during Tughlaq era

The Delhi Sultanate was the first of the two major Islamic empires which was based in mainland India between 1206 and 1526. It emerged after the disintegration of the Ghurid Empire in 1206. During the last quarter of the 12th century, Muhammad of Ghor invaded the Indo-Gangetic plain, conquering in succession Ghazni, Multan, Lahore, and Delhi. Qutb-ud-din Aybak, one of his generals proclaimed himself Sultan of Delhi. In Bengal and Bihar, the reign of general Muhammad bin Bakhtiyar Khalji was established. Shamsuddin Iltutmish (1211–1236), established the Delhi Sultanate on a firm basis, which enabled future sultans to push in every direction. Within the next 100 years, the Delhi Sultanate extended its way east to Bengal and south to the Deccan. The sultanate was in constant flux as five dynasties rose and fell: the Mamluk dynasty (1206–90), Khalji dynasty (1290–1320), Tughlaq dynasty (1320–1413), Sayyid dynasty (1414–51), and Lodi dynasty (1451–1526). Power in Delhi was often gained by violence — nineteen of the thirty-five sultans were assassinated — and was legitimized by reward for tribal loyalty. Factional rivalries and court intrigues were as numerous as they were treacherous; territories controlled by the sultan expanded and shrank depending on his personality and fortunes.

The Delhi sultanate peaked under Muhammad bin Tughlaq in 1335. However, it came under gradual decline afterwards, with kingdoms like the Bengal Sultanate, Madurai Sultanate, Khandesh Sultanate and Bahmani Sultanate all asserting independence. Timur's invasion in 1398 only accelerated the process, and the Gujarat Sultanate and Jaunpur Sultanate broke away. Some of these kingdoms, such as Jaunpur, were again brought back under the Delhi Sultanate's control, although the rest remained independent from central rule until the conquests of the Mughal Empire in the 16th and 17th centuries.

Both the Qur'an and the Shari'a (Islamic law) provided the basis for enforcing Islamic administration over the independent Hindu rulers. According to Angus Maddison, between the years 1000 and 1500, India's GDP, of which the sultanates represented a significant part, grew by nearly 80%, to $60.5 billion; however, this growth was lower than India's GDP growth during the prior 1,000 years. Additionally, Maddison estimates that India's population grew by nearly 50% during the same period. The Delhi Sultanate period coincided with a greater use of mechanical technology in the Indian subcontinent. While India previously already had sophisticated agriculture, food crops, textiles, medicine, minerals, and metals, it was not as sophisticated as the Islamic world or China in terms of mechanical technology. Sultan 'Ala ud-Din made an attempt to reassess, systematize, and unify land revenues and urban taxes and to institute a highly centralized system of administration over his realm, but his efforts were abortive. Although agriculture in North India improved as a result of new canal construction and irrigation methods, including what came to be known as the Persian wheel, prolonged political instability and parasitic methods of tax collection brutalized the peasantry. Yet trade and a market economy, encouraged by the free-spending habits of the aristocracy, acquired new impetus both in India and overseas. Experts in metalwork, stonework and textile manufacture responded to the new patronage with enthusiasm. In this period Persian language and many Persian cultural aspects became dominant in the centers of power, as the rulers of the Delhi Sultanate had been thoroughly Persianized since the era of the Ghaznavids.

=== Mughal Empire ===
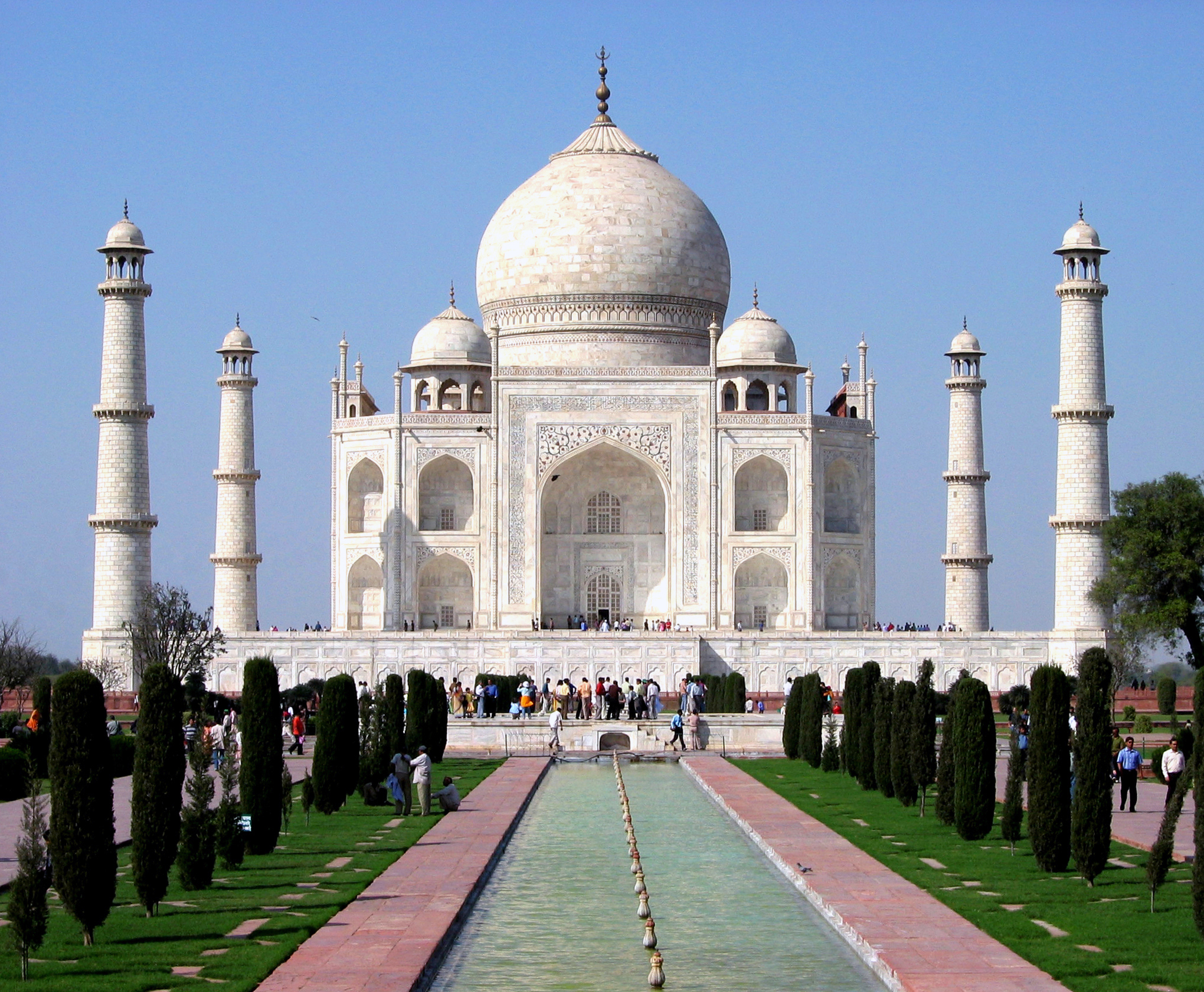
The Taj Mahal, built by Shah Jahan.

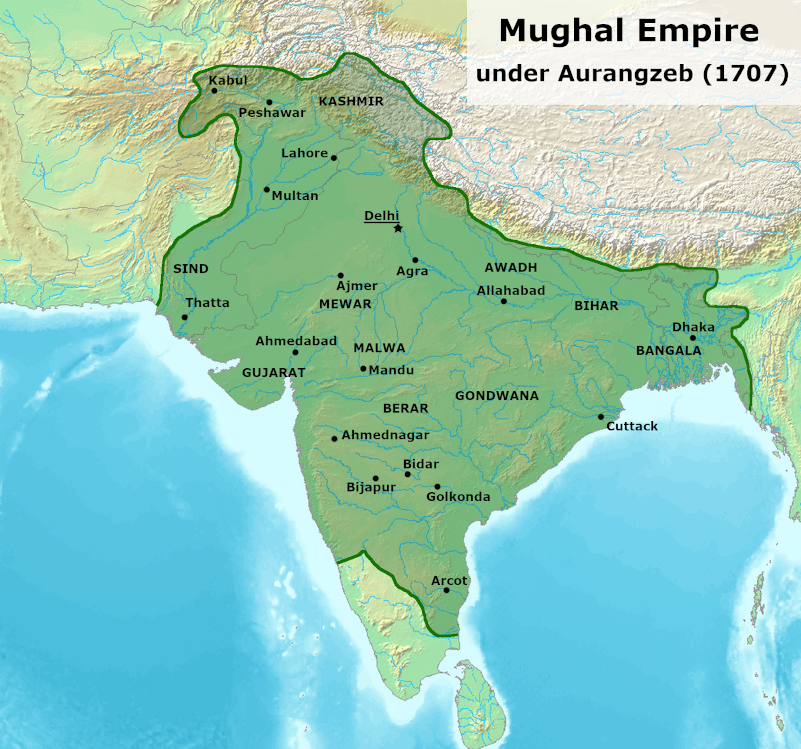
Mughal Empire in 1707

The Mughal Empire was the second and the last major Islamic empire to assert dominance over most of the Indian subcontinent between 1526 and 1857. The empire was founded by the Turco-Mongol prince Babur in 1526, when he defeated Ibrahim Lodi, the last ruler of the Delhi Sultanate at the First Battle of Panipat. Babur, Humayun, Akbar, Jahangir, Shah Jahan, and Aurangzeb are known as the six great Mughal Emperors. Apart from the brief interruption of sixteen years by the Afghan Sur Empire between 1540 and 1556, the Mughals continued to rule in one form or other till 1857.

India was producing 24.5% of the world's manufacturing output up until 1750. Mughal economy has been described as a form of proto-industrialization, like that of 18th-century Western Europe prior to the Industrial Revolution.

After the death of Aurangzeb in 1707, the empire declined and reduced subsequently to the region in and around Old Delhi by 1757 to 1760. The decline of the Mughals in the 18th century provided opportunity for the Nawabs of Oudh and Bengal as well as Nizam of Hyderabad to become independent. The empire was formally dissolved by the British Raj after the Indian Rebellion of 1857.

=== Western and central India ===
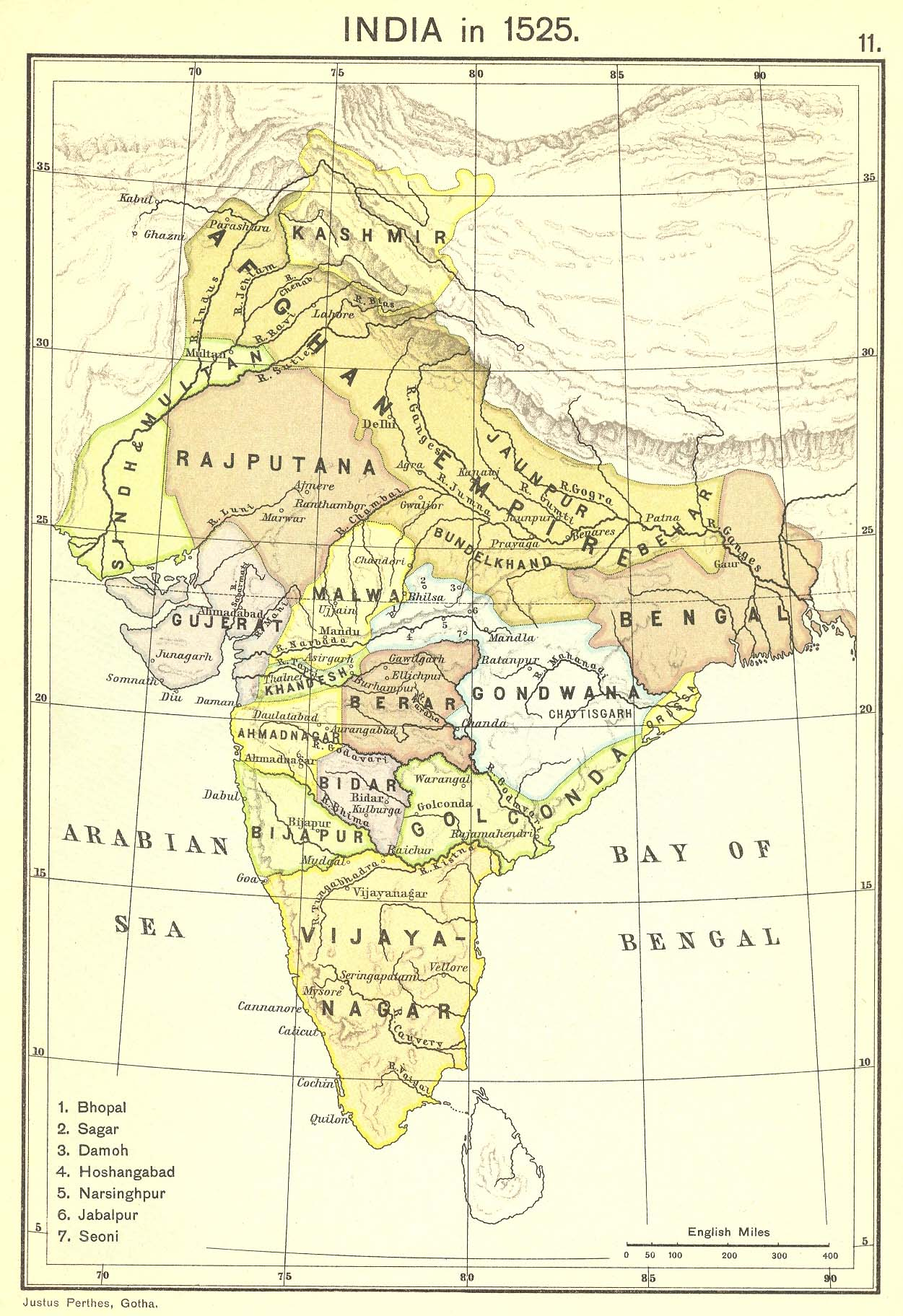
Map of Indian subcontinent in 1525. Sultanates of Gujarat, Malwa, Bengal, Kashmir and Delhi as well as Deccan sultanates can be seen in the south.

Sultan Alauddin Khalji (r.1296–1316) carried out extensive conquests in the western India. He invaded the kingdoms of Gujarat (raided in 1299 and annexed in 1304), Jaisalmer (1299), Ranthambore (1301), Chittor (1303), Malwa (1305), Siwana (1308), and Jalore (1311). These victories ended several Rajput and other Hindu dynasties, including the Paramaras, the Vaghelas, the Chahamanas of Ranastambhapura and Jalore, the Rawal branch of the Guhilas, and possibly the Yajvapalas; and permanently establishing Muslim rule in the regions of central and western India. After his death, independent Islamic kingdoms emerged there.

==== Gujarat Sultanate ====
The Gujarat Sultanate was founded by Sultan Zafar Khan Muzaffar, whose ancestors were Tāṅks from Punjab. Earlier, he was the governor of Gujarat appointed by the Tughlaq Sultans of Delhi. However, in the aftermath of the destruction of Delhi by Emir Timur, he declared independence in 1407. The next sultan, his grandson Ahmad Shah I moved the capital to Ahmedabad in 1411. His successor Muhammad Shah II subdued most Rajput chieftains. The prosperity of the sultanate reached its zenith during the rule of Mahmud Begada. He also subdued most Gujarati Rajput chieftains and built a navy off the coast of Diu. In 1509, the Portuguese empire wrested Diu from the Sultanate in the Battle of Diu. The Mughal emperor Humayun attacked Gujarat in 1535 and briefly occupied it, during which Bombay, Bassein and Damaon would become a Portuguese colony, thereafter Bahadur Shah was killed by the Portuguese while making a deal in 1537. The end of the sultanate came in 1573, when Akbar annexed Sultanate of Guzerat into his empire. The kingdom was primarily based in the present-day state of Gujarat, India.

==== Malwa Sultanate ====
The Malwa Sultanate was another Muslim kingdom in the Malwa region, covering the present day Indian states of Madhya Pradesh and south-eastern Rajasthan from 1392 to 1562. It was founded by Dilawar Khan, who following Timur's invasion and the disintegration of the Delhi Sultanate, in 1401/2, made Malwa an independent realm. In 1561, the Sultanate was conquered by the Mughal Empire from its last ruler, Baz Bahadur.

==== Other Western states ====
Sindh was ruled by a series of Muslim dynasties including Habbaris, Soomras, Sammas, Arghuns and Tarkhans, after the disintegration of Arab caliphate. Following decline of Mughal empire, Kalhora and Talpur Nawabs ruled Sindh. Kingdom of Mewat was also a prominent Muslim Rajput kingdom in Rajasthan. Gonds of Deogarh was a Gond tribal Islamic kingdom located in Nagpur, Maharashtra.

=== North India ===
==== Bengal Sultanate ====
In 1339, the Bengal region became independent from the Delhi Sultanate and consisted of numerous Islamic city-states. The Bengal Sultanate was formed in 1352 after Shamsuddin Ilyas Shah, ruler of Satgaon, defeated Alauddin Ali Shah of Lakhnauti and Ikhtiyaruddin Ghazi Shah of Sonargaon; ultimately unifying Bengal into one single independent Sultanate. At its greatest extent, the Bengal Sultanate's realm and protectorates stretched from Jaunpur in the west, Tripura and Arakan in the east, Kamrup and Kamata in the north and Puri in the south.

Although a Sunni Muslim monarchy ruled by Turco-Persians, Bengalis, Habshis and Pashtuns, they still employed many non-Muslims in the administration and promoted a form of religious pluralism. It was known as one of the major trading nations of the medieval world, attracting immigrants and traders from different parts of the world. Bengali ships and merchants traded across the region, including in Malacca, China, Africa, Europe and the Maldives through maritime links and overland trade routes. Contemporary European and Chinese visitors described Bengal as the "richest country to trade with" due to the abundance of goods in Bengal. In 1500, the royal capital of Gaur was the fifth-most populous city in the world with 200,000 residents.

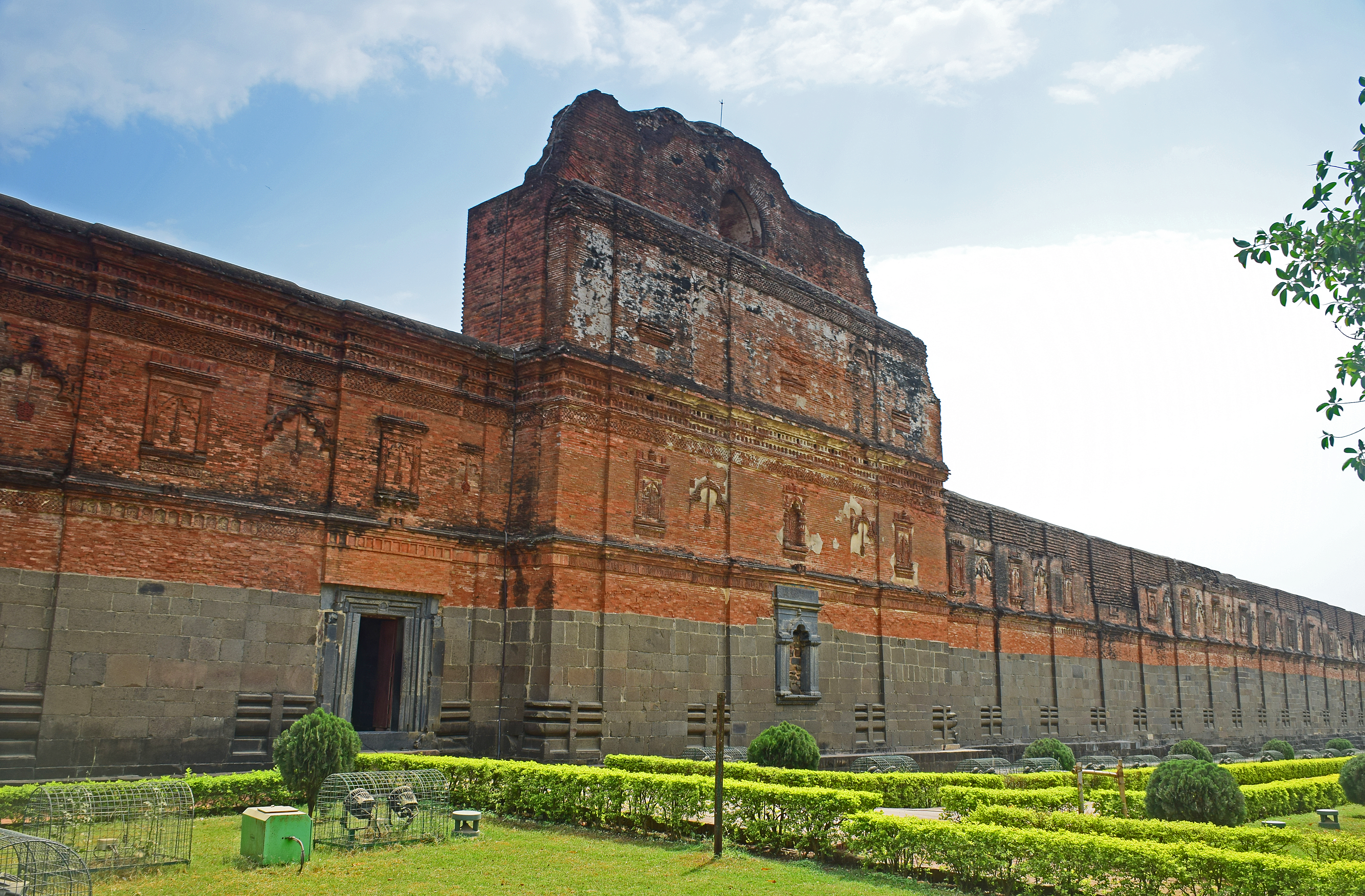
Ruins of the Adina Mosque, once the largest mosque in the Indian subcontinent, in Pandua, the first capital of the Bengal Sultanate.

Persian was used as a diplomatic and commercial language. Arabic was the liturgical language of the clergy, and the Bengali language became a court language. The patronage of the sultans raised Bengali from the language of the masses. Sultan Ghiyasuddin Azam Shah sponsored the construction of madrasas in Makkah and Madinah. The schools became known as the Ghiyasia Banjalia Madrasas. Taqi al-Din al-Fasi, a contemporary Arab scholar, was a teacher at the madrasa in Makkah. The madrasa in Madinah was built at a place called Husn al-Atiq near the Prophet's Mosque. Several other Bengali Sultans also sponsored madrasas in the Hejaz.

The Karrani dynasty was the last ruling dynasty of the sultanate. The Mughals became determined to bring an end to the independent kingdom. Mughal rule formally began with the Battle of Rajmahal in 1576, when the last Sultan Daud Khan Karrani was defeated by the forces of Emperor Akbar, and the establishment of the Bengal Subah. The eastern deltaic Bhati region remained outside of Mughal control until being absorbed in the early 17th century. The delta was controlled by a confederation of aristocrats of the Sultanate, who became known as the Baro-Bhuiyans. The Mughal government eventually suppressed the remnants of the Sultanate and brought all of Bengal under full Mughal control.

==== Jaunpur Sultanate ====
The Jaunpur Sultanate was founded in 1394 by Khwajah-i-Jahan Malik Sarwar, a eunuch slave and former wazir of Sultan Muhammad Shah III, amidst the disintegration of the Delhi Sultanate's Tughlaq dynasty. It was centred in Jaunpur, and the Sultanate extended authority over Awadh and a large part of the Ganges-Yamuna Doab between 1394 and 1479. It reached its greatest height under the rule of Sultan Ibrahim Shah, who also vastly contributed to the development of Islamic education in the Sultanate. In 1479, Sultan Hussain Khan was defeated by the forces of Bahlul Lodi, sultan of the Lodi dynasty of the Delhi Sultanate, which abruptly brought an end to independent Jaunpur and its reabsorption into the Delhi Sultanate.

==== Nawabs of Bengal ====
Nawab was a title given by the Mughals to the governors of different provinces. During disintegration of the empire in the 18th century, many Nawabs became de-facto independent.

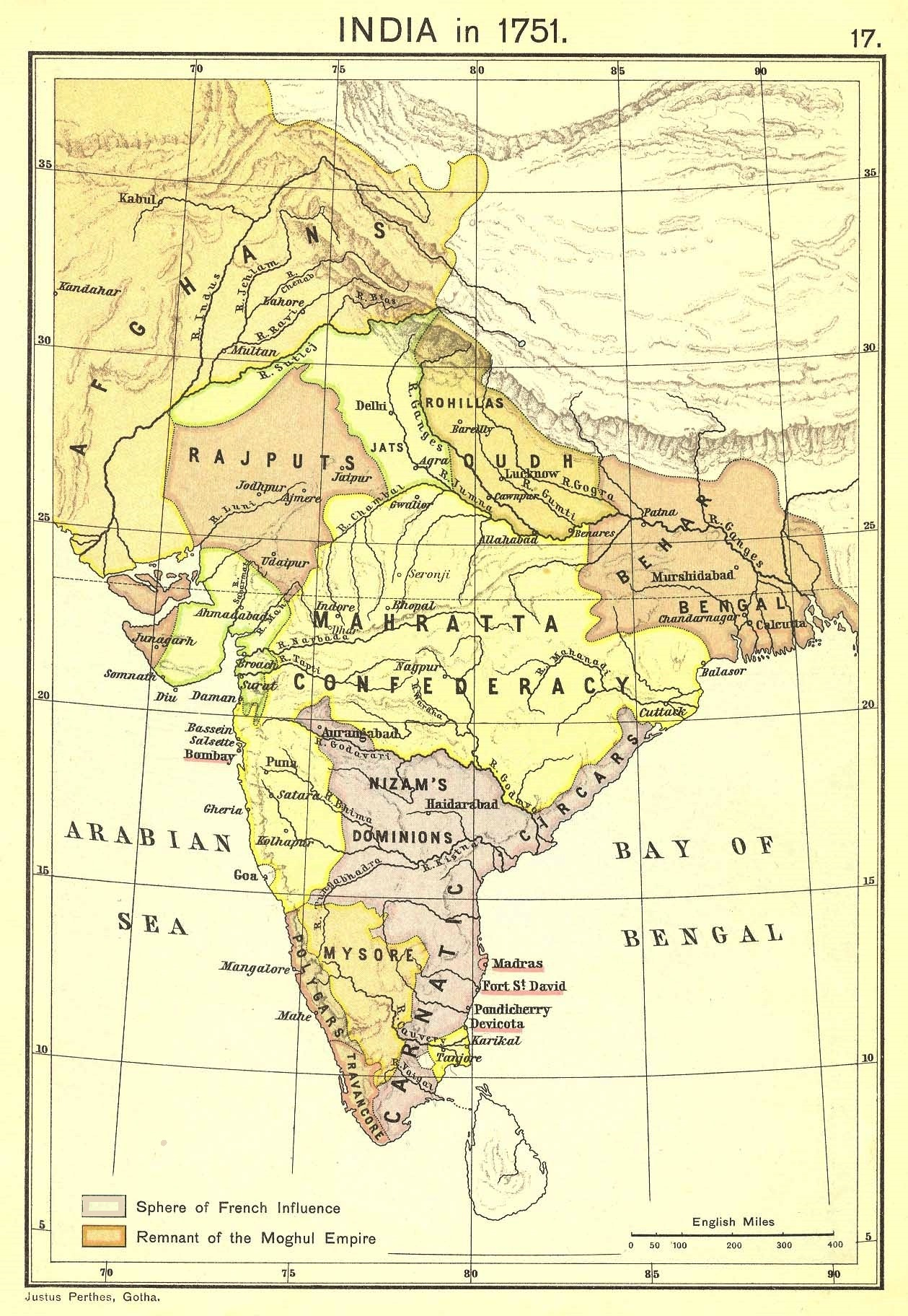
Bengal Subah in 1751 (in red). Muslim kingdoms of Awadh, Hyderabad Deccan, Carnatic and Mysore can also be seen.

In the early 18th-century, the Nawabs of Bengal and Murshidabad were the de-facto independent rulers of the three regions of Bengal, Bihar, and Orissa which constitute the modern-day sovereign country of Bangladesh and the Indian states of West Bengal, Bihar and Orissa. The Nawabs of Bengal oversaw a period of proto-industrialization. The region was a major production center for cotton muslin cloth, silk cloth, shipbuilding, gunpowder, saltpetre, and metalworks. The British company eventually challenged the authority of the Nawabs. In the aftermath of the siege of Calcutta in 1756, in which the Nawab's forces overran the main British base, the East India Company dispatched a fleet led by Robert Clive who defeated the last independent Nawab Siraj-ud-Daulah at the Battle of Plassey in 1757. Mir Jafar was installed as the puppet Nawab. His successor Mir Qasim attempted in vain to dislodge the British. The defeat of Nawab Mir Qasim of Bengal, Nawab Shuja-ud-Daula of Oudh, and Mughal Emperor Shah Alam II at the Battle of Buxar in 1764 paved the way for British expansion across India.

==== Nawabs of Awadh ====
The Nawab of Awadh ruled major parts of present-day Uttar Pradesh. The Nawabs of Awadh, along with many other Nawabs, were regarded as members of the nobility of the greater Mughal Empire. They joined Ahmad Shah Durrani in the Third Battle of Panipat (1761) and restored Shah Alam II (r. 1760–1788 and 1788–1806) to the imperial throne. The Nawab of Awadh also fought the Battle of Buxar (1764) preserving the interests of the Moghul. Oudh State eventually declared itself independent from the rule of the "Great Moghul" in 1818.

Oudh joined other Indian states in an upheaval against British rule in 1858 during one of the last series of actions in the Indian rebellion of 1857. In the course of this uprising detachments of the British Indian Army from the Bombay Presidency overcame the disunited collection of Indian states in a single rapid campaign. Determined rebels continued to wage sporadic guerrilla clashes until the spring of 1859. This rebellion is also historically known as the Oudh campaign.

==== Other Northern states ====
In northern Indian subcontinent, the Multan-based Langah Sultanate and the Kashmir Sultanate were established during the 14th century. Nobles in the court of the Delhi Sultanate founded other Islamic dynasties elsewhere in India including Khandesh Sultanate. The Kingdom of Rohilkhand was also a major power in northern India in the 18th century.

=== South India ===
Till the early 14th century, south India was ruled by Hindu dynasties. During the reign of Sultan Alauddin Khalji (r.1296–1316), his slave-general Malik Kafur led multiple campaigns to the south of the Vindhyas, obtaining a considerable amount of wealth from Devagiri (1308), Warangal (1310) and Dwarasamudra (1311). These victories forced the Yadava king Ramachandra, the Kakatiya king Prataparudra, and the Hoysala king Ballala III to become Alauddin's tributaries. In 1321, Muhammad bin Tughluq was sent by his father to the Deccan Plateau to fight a military campaign against the Kakatiya dynasty. In 1323, the future sultan successfully laid siege upon the Kakatiya capital in Warangal. This victory over King Prataparudra ended the Kakatiya dynasty. Although the control of Delhi sultanate was weakened after 1335 in the south, its successor Muslim states continued to rule Deccan plateau for next several centuries.

==== Bahmani Sultanate ====
Bahmani Sultanate in 1470

The Muhammad bin Tughlaq's failure to hold securely the Deccan and South India resulted in the rise of competing for Southern dynasties: the Muslim Bahmani Sultanate (1347–1518) and the Hindu Vijayanagara Empire (1336–1646). Zafar Khan, a former provincial governor under the Tughluqs, revolted against Delhi Sultans and proclaimed himself sultan, taking the title Ala-ud-Din Bahman Shah in 1347. It was the first Muslim empire located in the Deccan region. Bahmani empire was known for its perpetual wars with its rival Vijayanagara, which would outlast the Sultanate. The Bahmani Sultans were patrons of the Persian language, culture and literature, and some members of the dynasty became well-versed in that language and composed its literature in that language. The Bahmani Sultanate adopted the patterns established by the Delhi overlords in tax collection and administration, but its downfall was caused in large measure by the competition and hatred between Deccani (domiciled Muslim immigrants and local converts) and paradesi (foreigners or officials in temporary service). The Bahmani Sultanate initiated a process of cultural synthesis visible in Hyderabad where cultural flowering is still expressed in vigorous schools of Deccani architecture and painting. The later rulers are buried in an elaborate tomb complex, known as the Bahmani Tombs. The exterior of one of the tombs is decorated with coloured tiles. Arabic, Persian and Urdu inscriptions are inscribed inside the tombs.

==== Deccan sultanates ====
The Bahmani Sultanate lasted for almost two centuries, until it fragmented into five smaller states, known as the Deccan sultanates (Bijapur, Golconda, Ahmadnagar, Berar, and Bidar) in 1527. Although the five sultanates were all ruled by Muslims, their founders were of diverse, and often originally non-Muslim origins: the Ahmadnagar Sultanate by a son of a slave of Marathi Brahmin origins; the Berar Sultanate by a slave of Kannada Brahmin; the Bidar Sultanate by a Georgian slave; the Bijapur Sultanate by a Georgian slave purchased by Mahmud Gawan and the Golconda Sultanate by a slave of Turkmen origin.

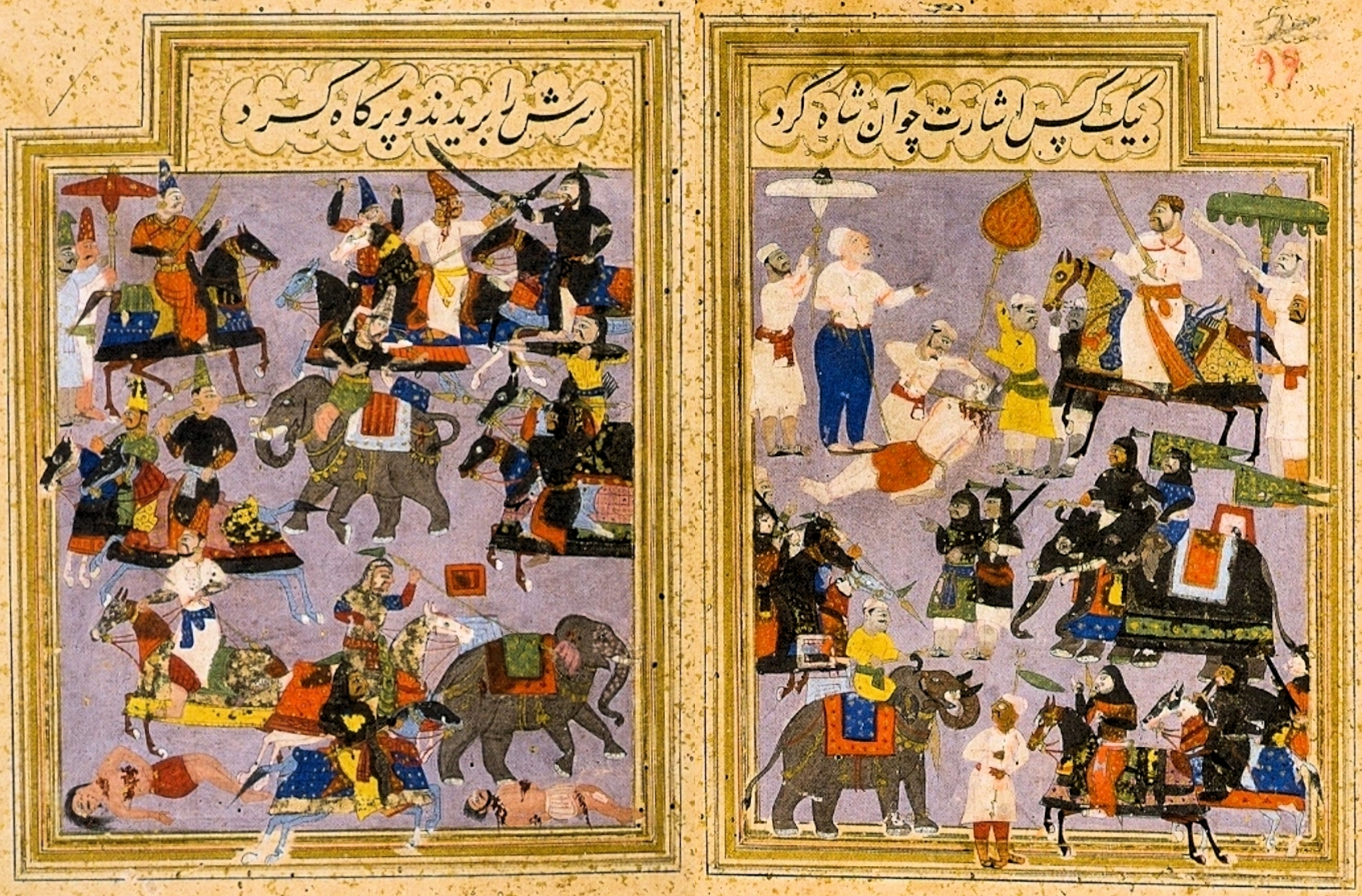
Panorama depicting the Battle of Talikota (1565), in which Deccan sultanates defeated the Vijayanagara Empire. Ta'rif-i Husain Shahi (Chronicle of Husain Shah).

The rulers of the Deccan sultanates made a number of cultural contributions in the fields of literature, art, architecture, and music. An important contribution was the development of the Deccani language, which, having started development under the Bahmani rulers, developed into an independent spoken and literary language during this period by continuously borrowing from Arabic-Persian, Marathi, Kannada, and Telugu. Deccani later became known as Dakhani Urdu to distinguish it from north Indian Urdu. Deccani miniature painting — which flourished in the courts of Ahmadnagar, Bijapur, and Golconda — is another major cultural contribution of the Deccan sultanates.

When the rulers of the five Deccan sultanates combined their forces and attacked the Vijayanagara Empire in 1565, the empire crumbled at the Battle of Talikot.

==== Nizams of Hyderabad ====
Nizam, a shortened version of Nizam-ul-Mulk, meaning Administrator of the Realm, was the title of the native sovereigns of Hyderabad state, India, since 1719, belonging to the Asaf Jahi dynasty. The dynasty was founded by Nizam-ul-Mulk, Asaf Jah I, a viceroy of the Deccan under the Mughal emperors from 1713 to 1721 who intermittently ruled under the title "Asaf Jah" in 1924. After Aurangzeb's death in 1707, the Mughal Empire crumbled, and the viceroy in Hyderabad, the young Asaf Jah, declared..himself independent.
The dynasty ruled for 7 generations, with the last Nizam — Mir Osman Ali Khan showing an enormous contributions on the field of education, construction of major public buildings across the kingdom, setting up of Nizam's Guaranteed State Railway, donations to universities and temples and donating 14,000 acres (5,700 ha) of land from his personal estate to Vinobha Bhave's Bhoodan movement.

==== Mysore Kingdom ====
Mysore Kingdom in 1784.

Hyder Ali and Tipu Sultan held power and were de-facto rulers of the proto-industrialised Mysore Sultanate during the latter part of the 18th century. They made alliances with France and fought the Anglo-Mysore Wars predominantly against the British.

==== Carnatic Sultanate ====
The Carnatic Sultanate was a kingdom in South India between about 1690 and 1855, and was under the legal purview of the Nizam of Hyderabad, until their demise. The Nawabs of Carnatic eventually ceded tax rights to the British in 1801 following Carnatic wars, and the kingdom was abolished.

==== Other Southern states ====
Other southern states include the Arakkal Kingdom (of modern-day Kerala) who were a subordinate of their masters the Kolathiris and the short-lived Madurai Sultanate which was centered in and around Madurai and existed for barely 40 years.

== See also ==
- The History of India, as Told by Its Own Historians
- Islam in South Asia
- History of India

== Literature ==
- Majumdar, Ramesh Chandra; Pusalker, A. D.; Majumdar, A. K., eds. (1960). The History and Culture of the Indian People. Vol. VI: The Delhi Sultanate. Bombay: Bharatiya Vidya Bhavan.
- Majumdar, Ramesh Chandra; Pusalker, A. D.; Majumdar, A. K., eds. (1973). The History and Culture of the Indian People. Vol. VII: The Mughal Empire. Bombay: Bharatiya Vidya Bhavan.
- Elliot, Sir H. M., Edited by Dowson, John. The History of India, as Told by Its Own Historians. The Muhammadan Period; published by London Trubner Company 1867–1877. (Online Copy: The History of India, as Told by Its Own Historians. The Muhammadan Period; by Sir H. M. Elliot; Edited by John Dowson; London Trubner Company 1867–1877 – This online Copy has been posted by: The Packard Humanities Institute; Persian Texts in Translation; Also find other historical books: Author List and Title List)
