= Siharas of Kannauj =

Siharas (also known as Sayar, Satbar, and Satban) was the Rajput king of Kannauj in the 7th century CE.

== Life ==
Siharas was the son of Rasal, who preceded him as king of Kannuaj.

According to the Chachnama, when Chach of Alor began the expansion of his empire, he defeated Matta, the chief of Siwistan, and besieged him in his fort. Shortly afterward, Matta's garrison surrendered and the chief sued for peace. Chach, however, appointed Matta as his local governor. Not contented, however, Matta sent a messenger to Agham Lohana for assistance. This plan fell through when Agham's messengers were arrested by those loyal to Chach.

Upon Chach's death, Matta traveled to Kannuaj, which was flourishing at the time. He requested assistance from Siharas, telling him that Chach's brother and successor, Chandar, was a monk who spent his entire day at prayer. He asked Siharas to invade Chandar's domains, and appoint him as feudatory over a portion of them. Siharas replied affirmatively, saying that "Chach was a great king, and had an extensive territory under his sway. As he is dead, I will bring his possession under my own rule, if I take them. They will form a great addition to my kingdom, and I will appoint you over one of their divisions."

Then Siharas aligned with Barha, a grandson of Chach, who ruled over Kashmir and Ramal. They invaded Chandar's domains, and sent an envoy to the ruler to induce him to come, make his submission, and sue for protection. Chandar's officers, however, were resolute and prepared, and Chandar readied his kingdom for war. The Siharas was captured during a conflict at a parley and peace concluded by means of hostages. Thus, the campaign failed, and Chandar continued to sit on the throne.
