= Ranaditya Satya =

Ruler in what is now Pakistan

Rāṇādityā Satyā
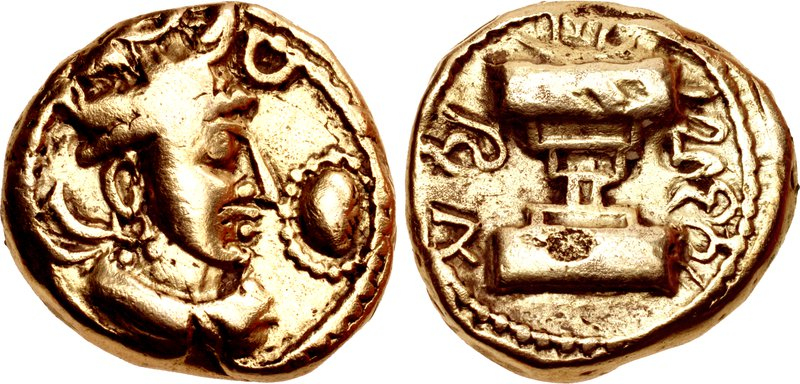
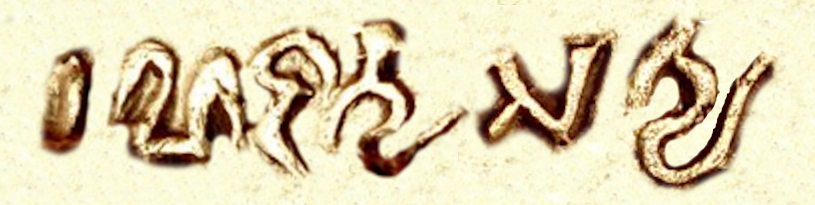
- Rāṇāditya Satya, 5th-6th century CE Sind mint. Portrait of the ruler on the model of Peroz I, faced by Sun symbol. On the reverse, Sasanian-style fire with legend: Rāṇāditya Satya
- Reign: 5-6th century CE
- Predecessor: Rulers of Sasanian Sindh
- Successor: Caliphs of the Caliphal Province of Sind
Names
- Rāṇā Dityāsatyā
- Religion: Hinduism

Rāṇādityā Satyā (formerly read Raṇa Datasatya on his coins), was a ruler in Sindh, modern-day Pakistan, probably c. 480 CE. Fishman et al. (2021) tentatively identify him with Rai Dewaji or Devaditya, known from Chachnama to have been the founder of the Rai dynasty.

His coins employ a sun symbol together with the portrait of the ruler, and have on the reverse a fire altar of the type seen on Sasanian coinage, in which the traditional attendants of Sasanian coinage are replaced by a legend in Brahmi script. The legend in Brahmi reads Rāṇādityā Satyā.

The coins of Rāṇāditya Satya are considered as modelled on the coins of Peroz I, particularly from the portrait type.

These coins are the latest known of the series of Sasanian-type "coinage of Sindh", which were minted in the area of Sindh in modern Pakistan, from Multan to the mouth of the Indus River, on the model the coinage of Sasanian Empire rulers Shapur II down to Peroz I, and are covering approximately the period from 325 to 480 CE. Sasanian rulers from the reign of Shapur I did claim control of the Sindh area in their inscriptions. Shapur I installed his son Narseh as "King of the Sakas" in the areas of Eastern Iran as far as Sindh.

This type of coinage disappeared with the Arab conquest of Sindh, in the 8th century CE.
