= Conquest of Multan (714) =

- Part of Umayyad conquest of Sindh
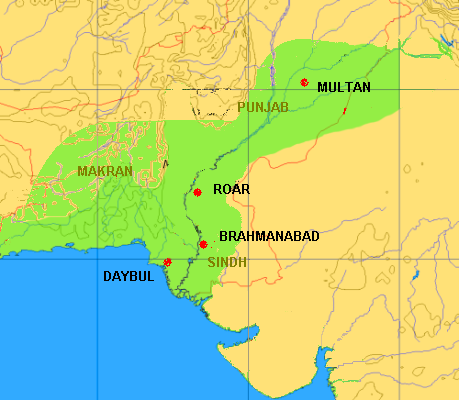
- Extent of Muhammad bin Qasim's conquests
Date	714
Location	Multan, Pakistan
Result	Umayyad victory

Belligerents
Umayyad Caliphate	Kingdom of Sindh

Commanders and leaders
Muhammad ibn al-Qasim	Bachhra

Strength
Unknown	Unknown

Casualties and losses
240 killed	6,000 killed

The Conquest of Multan was a military campaign launched by the Umayyads against the city of Multan. The conquest was successful, and it was the last military campaign of Muhammad ibn al-Qasim.

== Prelude ==
After the conquest of Aror by the Umayyads led by Muhammad ibn al-Qasim, the Umayyad viceroy of Iraq, Al-Hajjaj ibn Yusuf, ordered Muhammad to settle on Aror or Multan permanently. Muhammad chose Multan as his next target. On his way he besieged a fortress led by Raja Dahir's cousin, Kaksa. The fort fell, and Kaksa submitted to Muhammad, becoming his trusted counselor. Another fortress called Gholkandah fell to the Umayyads, killing 4,000 military men, and its governor escaped to Sikka fortress while the inhabitants surrendered and were spared.

== Conquest ==
The Umayyad forces arrived at Sikka Fortress, a place near Multan, located on the south bank of the Ravi River. Sikka Fort was led by a man named Bachhra. He sallied out with his men against the Muslims, and a fierce fight ensued. The siege lasted for 17 days and ended with the fort captured by the Muslims, but at a terrible cost, losing 25 officers and 215 soldiers. Muhammad was furious and ordered the fort to be destroyed. Bachhra fled to Multan. The Umayyads then marched to Multan. There Bachhra again sallied out with his men, but the Umayyads repelled him. The fighting continued for 2 months. The garrison threw rocks and arrows using slings and catapults. The Muslims began running out of supplies, forcing them to eat their own donkeys.

The Umayyads failed to breach the walls or capture them. While the fighting was raging, a man from the city came to the Umayyads and informed them about a northern section of the walls where water supplies the city. According to Chach Nama, the Umayyads sneaked into that section and made a breach, while Al-Baladhuri states that they cut off the water supply, which forced the city to surrender unconditionally. Whatever the case, Multan fell; 6,000 military men were killed and their followers enslaved; however, artisans, traders, and commoners were spared. The Muslims acquired a large amount of gold.

== Aftermath ==
The Conquest of Multan was the last campaign of Muhammad. His conquests were brought to an end by the death of Al-Hajjaj in 714 and the Umayyad Caliph al-Walid I. The accession of Sulayman ibn Abd al-Malik to the throne saw a violent reaction against Hajjaj's officials. Muhammad was ordered back to Iraq, where he was imprisoned and tortured by the new governor and soon died in prison.

== Sources ==
- Hugh Kennedy (2007), The Great Arab Conquests: How The Spread Of Islam Changed the World We Live in.
- Gobind Khushalani (2006), Chachnamah Retold : An Account Of The Arab Conquest Of Sindh.
- Muhammad Talha Amin Baruah (2025), Conquest of Sindh, Biography of Amir Imaduddin Muhammad bin Qasim (d.715).
