= Sasanian coinage of Sindh =

Sasanian coinage of Sindh
(325-480 CE)
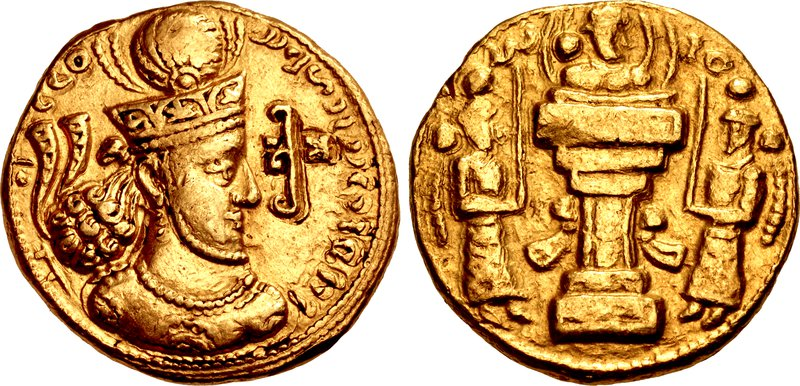
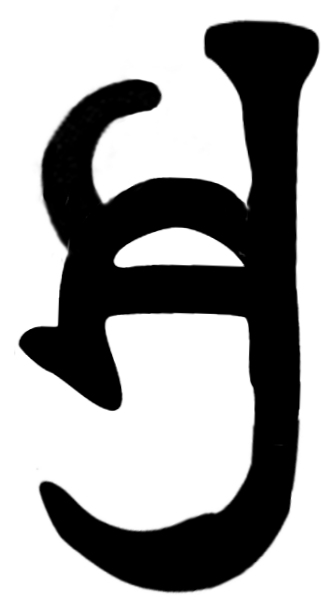
Gold coins of Sasanian Empire ruler Shapur III (r. 383-388), minted in Sindh, modern Pakistan. Obverse: Portrait of Shapur III, Brahmi script character Śrī ("Lord") in front of the King. Degraded Pahlavi legend around. Reverse: Fire altar with attendants.

The Sasanian coinage of Sindh refers to a series of Sasanian-style issues, minted from 325 to 480 CE in Sindh, in the southern part of modern Pakistan, with the coin type of successive Sasanian Empire rulers, from Shapur II to Peroz I. Together with the coinage of the Kushano-Sasanians, these coins are often described as "Indo-Sasanian". They form an important part of Sasanian coinage.

== Context ==
Sasanian rulers from the reign of Shapur I claimed control of the Sindh area in their inscriptions. Shapur I installed his son Narseh as "King of the Sakas" in the areas of Eastern Iran as far as Sindh. Two inscriptions during the reign of Shapur II mention his control of the regions of Sindh, Sakastan and Turan. Still, the exact term used by the Sasanian rulers in their inscription is Hndy, similar to Hindustan, which cannot be said for sure to mean "Sindh". Al-Tabari mentioned that Shapur II built cities in Sind and Sijistan.

== Characteristics of the coinage ==
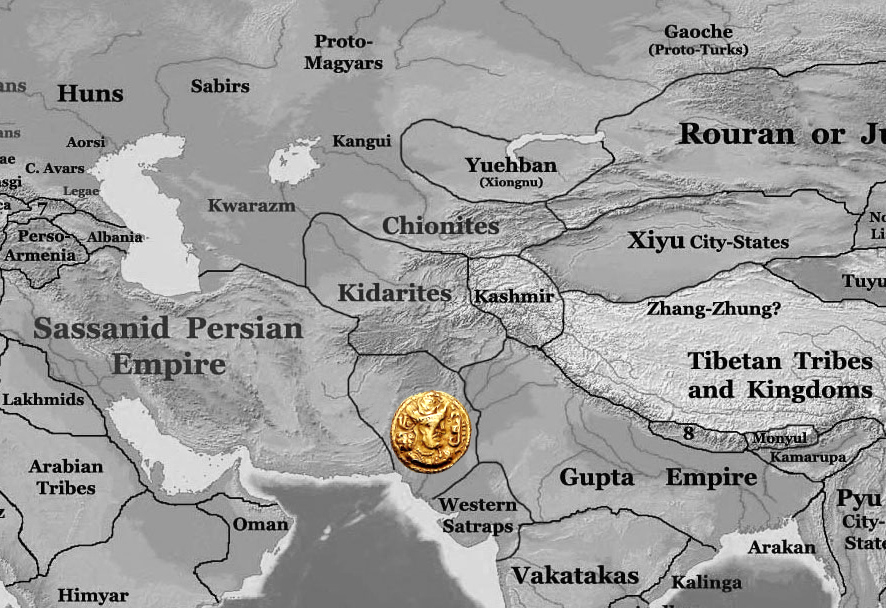
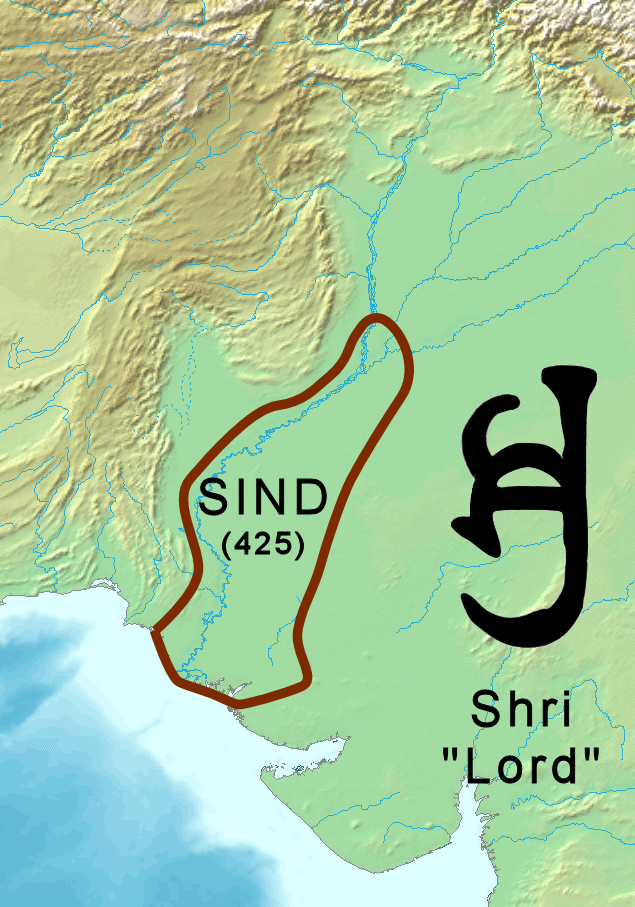
Location map of the Sasanian coinage of Sindh, circa 400-425 CE.

In the area of Sindh, from Multan to the mouth of the Indus River, an important series of gold coins was issued on the model the coinage of Sasanian Empire rulers Shapur II down to Peroz I, that is covering approximately the period from 325 to 480 CE. These coins have been recovered from the areas of Sindh, Baluchistan and Kutch. The coins are made of gold only, have a weight of around 7.20 grams, making them similar to the traditional "heavy" Sasanian dinars. The number of coins so far discovered suggests a significant volume of coinage, equivalent to about half of the more famous Kushano-Sassanian coinage. However, the time span of 150 years covered by the Sindh coins is much longer than the roughly 50 years time span of the Kushano-Sasanians, suggested about 1/6th of the Kushano-Sasanian output per time unit.

The coins are not the usual Sasanian imperial type, and the legend around the portrait tends to be degraded Middle Persian in the Pahlavi script, but they have the Brahmi script character Śrī ( "Lord") in front of the portrait of the King. The coins suggest some sort of Sasanian control of Sind during the 5th century, a recognition of Sasanian overlordship, but the precise extent of the Sasanian presence or influence is unknown. The facts that these coins do not use the traditional Sasanian imperial titulature, that they do not use the Sasanian weight standards, and that the standard Sasanian silver monetary standard was not in circulation in the region, all suggest that the Sasanians were actually not ruling directly in Sindh. Still, such vast influence from the Arabic peninsula to the Sindh and the Kushan realm probably provided the Sasanians with a remarkable position in terms of maritime trade, giving them a sort of trade monopoly.

The expansion of the Sasanians in northwestern India, which put an end to the remnants of Kushan rule, may also have been done at the expense of the Western Satraps and the Satavahanas.

=== Sasanian rulers (325-480 CE) ===
Sindh coinage of Sasanian Empire rulers from Shapur II down to Peroz I are known, covering approximately the period from 325 to 480 CE. The last coins of the series, those copied on Peroz I (r. 459–484), deviate from the series as they introduce a Brahmi legend, often with the title "Rana Datasatya". Paradoxically, several of the Sasanians kings have more dinar gold coins known from the Sindh mints than from the regular Sasanian mints: this is the case of Shapur III and Bahram V, both of whom only have about five regular Sasanian dinar gold coins known, compared to nine and thirteen respectively for the Sindh mints as of 2016. To explain this, R.C. Senior has suggested that Shapur III, who had a very troubled reign and suffered defeats at the hand of the Kushans, had been unable to issue gold coinage and had to take refuge in Sindh where he was able to strike his beautiful coins, some with the Sri symbol, and some without.

Sasanian rulers in Sindh coins

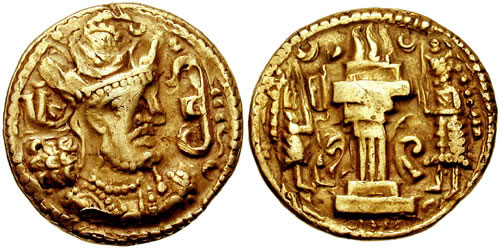
Sindh coin of Shapur II (309–379 CE) were minted in Sindh and Baluchistan in Pakistan and Kutch in India.

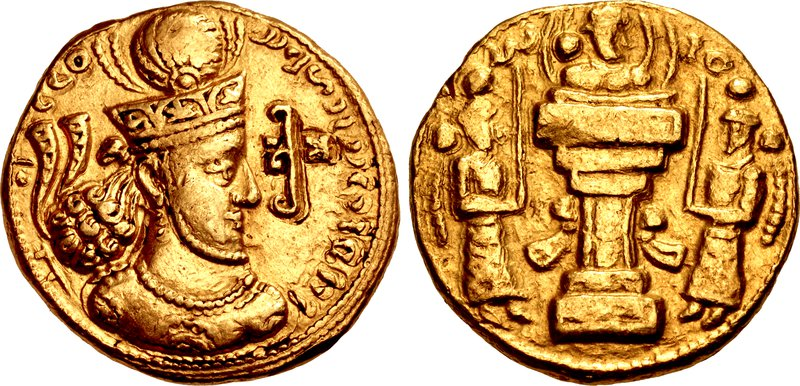
Shapur III (r.383-388).

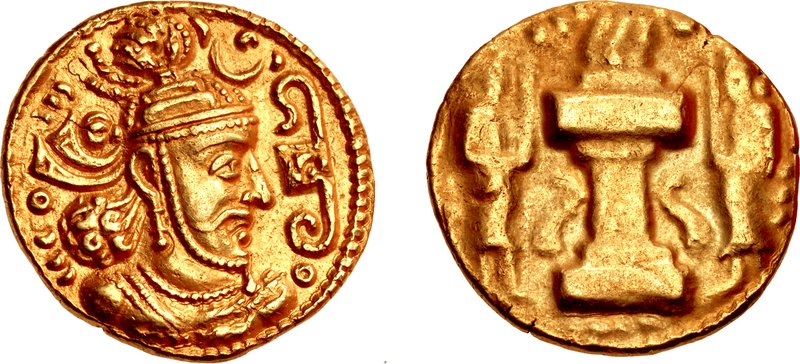
Yazdegerd I (r.399-420 CE).

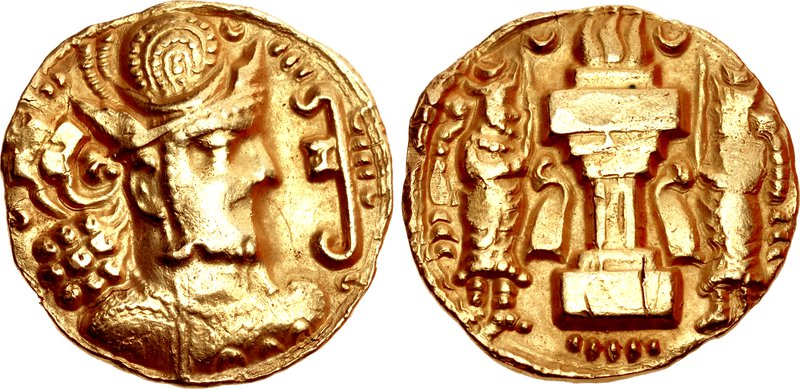
Sind coin of Bahram V (r.420-438 CE)

=== Hunnic issues (from 480 CE) ===
Later issues of the Peroz design abandon the degraded Palhavi legend altogether as well as the Sri mark, and instead used a Brahmi legend Rana Datasatya. Some later imitations of these coins after 480 CE may have been made by the Hephthalites, who added a Hunnic tamgha to the design, after they took over the northwestern Indian provinces. The quality of the coins also becomes very much degraded by that time, and the actual gold content becomes quite low.

Later imitations

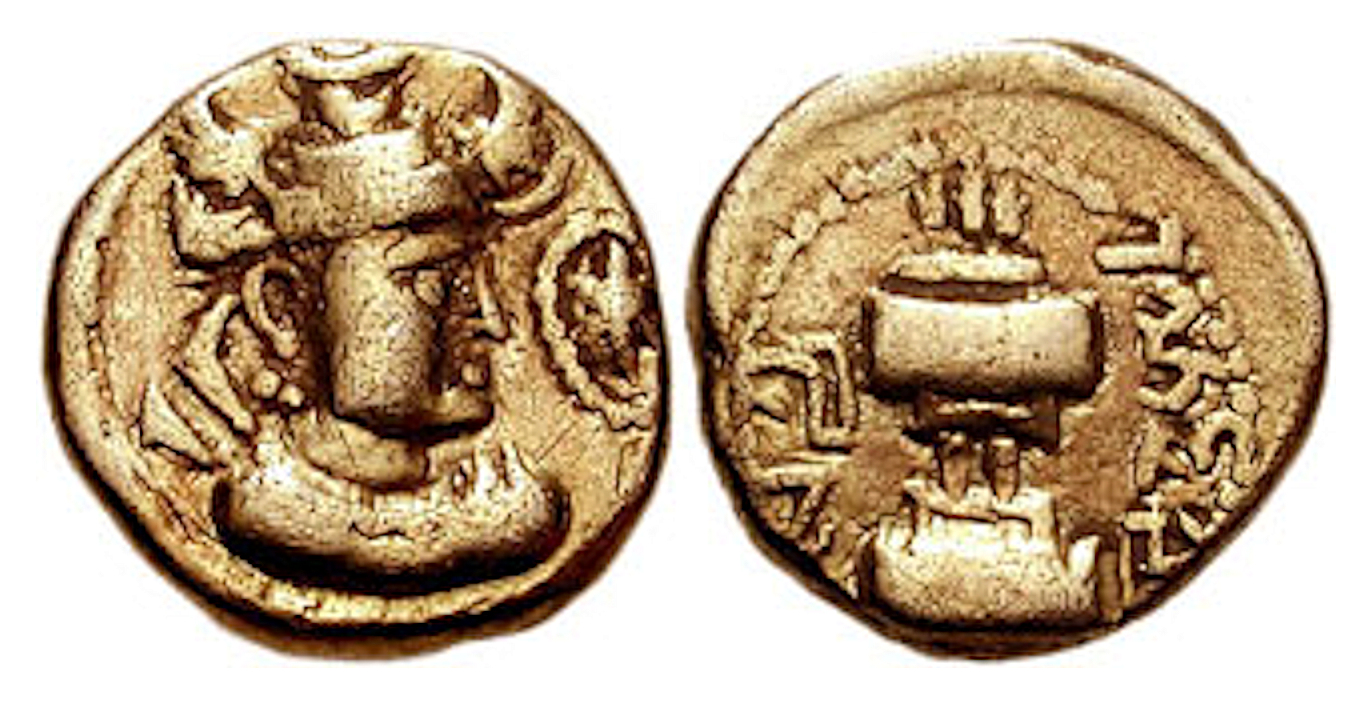
Coin of Rana Datasatya on the model of the Peroz I dinar, with solar symbol facing the ruler, and Rana Datasatya Brahmi legend on the reverse.

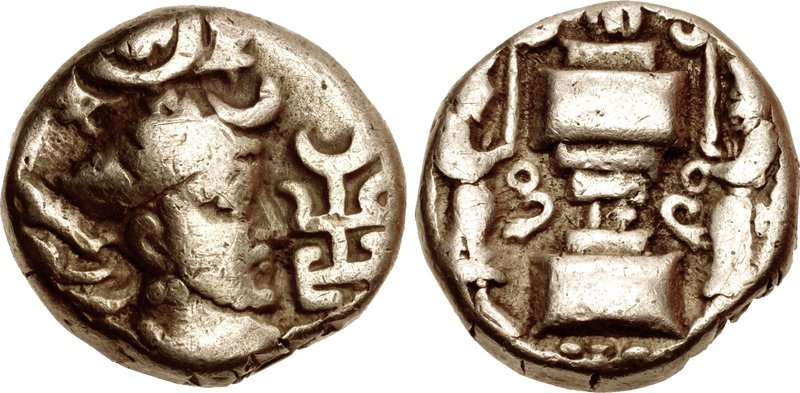
Late Hunnic coin of the Peroz type, with tamgha in front of the ruler.

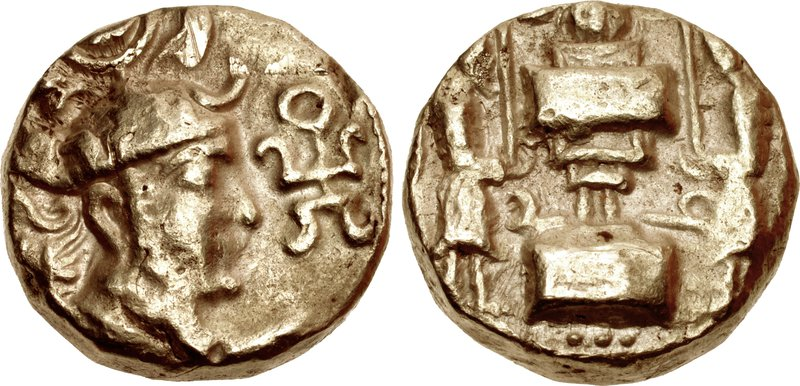
Uncertain Hunnic chieftain. Sind. 5th century

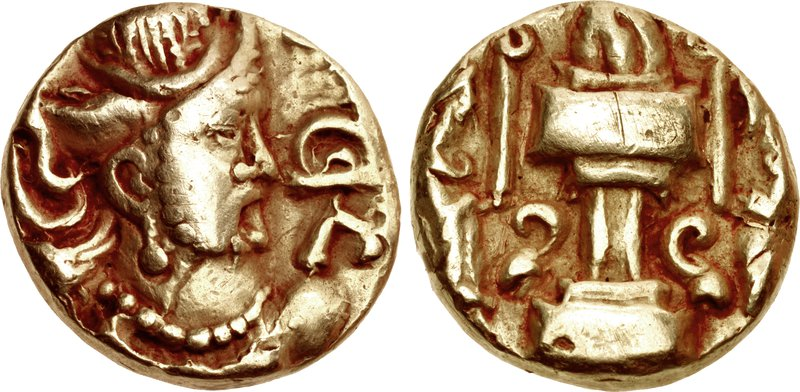
Hunnic issue, Sindh mint

=== Indo-Sasanian coinage (530 CE – 1202 CE) ===
There is also a whole category of Indian coins, in the "Indo-Sassanian style", that were derived from the Sasanian design in a rather geometric fashion, among the Gurjaras, Pratiharas, Chaulukya-Paramara and Palas from circa 530 CE to 1202 CE. Typically, the bust of the king on the obverse is highly simplified and geometric, and the design of the fire altar, with or without the two attendants, appears as a geometrical motif on the reverse of this type of coinage.

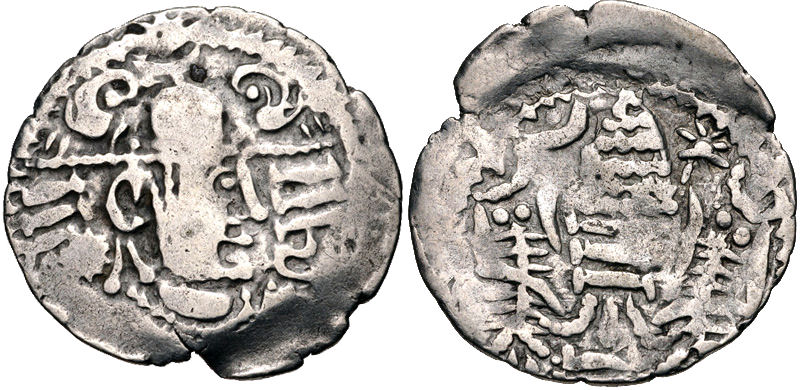
Coin of the Chavada dynasty, circa 570-712 CE. Crowned Sasanian-style bust right / Fire altar with ribbons and attendants; star and crescent flanking flames.

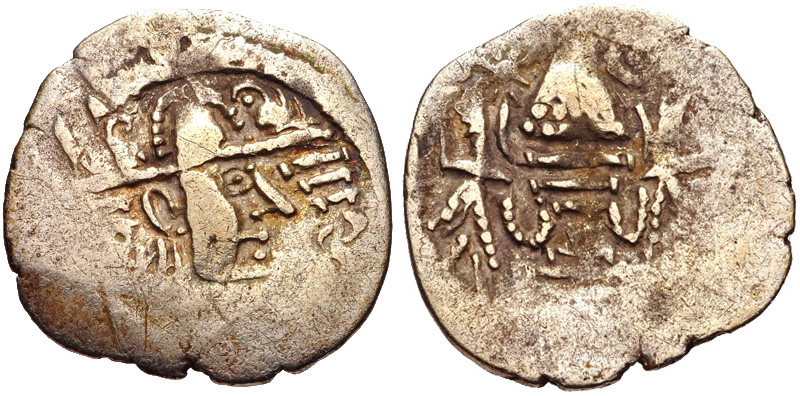
Coin of the Gurjara Confederacy, on the model of the Sasanian coinage of Sindh. Sindh, circa 570–712 CE

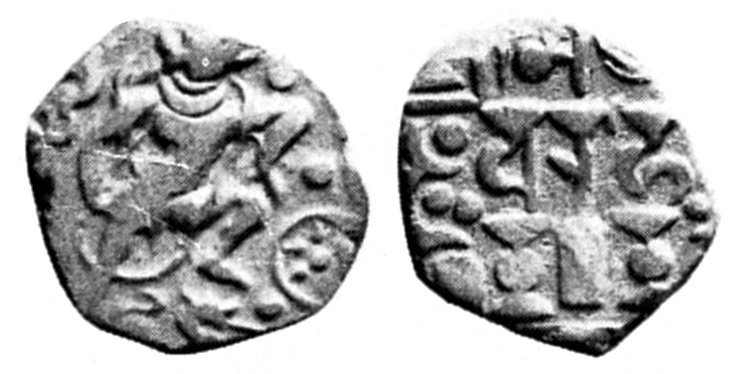
Gurjara-Pratihara coinage of Bhoja or Mihara, King of Kanauj, 850–900 CE. Obv: Boar, incarnation of Vishnu, and solar symbol. Rev: "Traces of Sasanian type". Legend: Srímad Ādi Varāha "The fortunate primaeval boar".

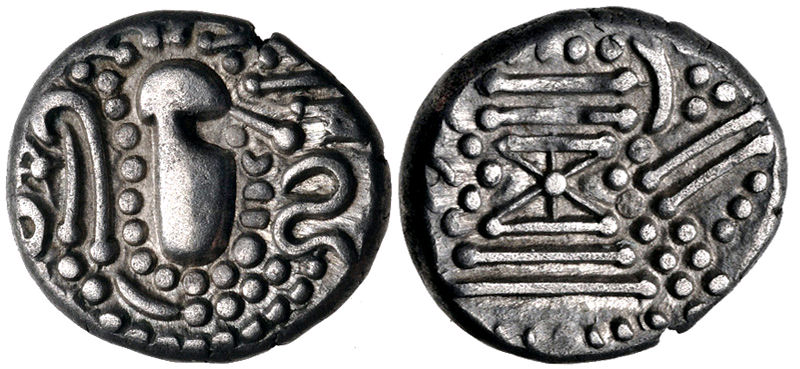
A Chaulukya-Paramara coin, circa 950–1050 CE. Stylized rendition of Chavda dynasty coins: Indo-Sassanian style bust right; pellets and ornaments around / Stylised fire altar; pellets around.
