= Seb Matta =

American politician (born 2007)

Maricopa County Clerk-elect of the Superior Court
- Assuming office January 2027
- Succeeding: Nancy Rodriguez (acting)

Personal details
- Born: Sebastian Maximiliano Matta; July 21, 2007 (age 19) Phoenix, Arizona, U.S.
- Citizenship: Argentina; United States
- Party: Democratic
- Education: Arizona State University
- Website: sebforclerk.com

Sebastian Maximiliano Matta (born July 21, 2007) is an Argentine-American politician serving as the Superior Court clerk-elect in Maricopa County, Arizona.

== Early life and education ==
Matta was born on July 21, 2007 in Phoenix, Arizona to a Venezuelan mother and Argentine father. His mother is an elementary school office manager and his father works for a law firm where he investigates personal injury claims. He voted in the 2023 Argentine general election, and speaks fluent Spanish.

Matta graduated from Thunderbird High School in 2025. As of November 2026, he is a sophomore at Arizona State University studying the philosophy of politics, morality and law. He will be a part-time student.

== Career ==
In August 2025, Matta began a campaign for Superior Court clerk in Maricopa County, Arizona. The county Democratic party assisted his campaign by gathering 4,000 signatures to appear on the ballot. Matta was the uncontested Democratic nominee in the primary election. He defeated Republican nominee Jeff Dial in the general election. He campaigned on expanding language access and increasing electronic filing for probate matters involving wills and estates. He succeeds acting clerk Nancy Rodriguez. Beginning in January 2027, Matta will oversee an office of 600 employees with an annual budget of US$65M. Arizona secretary of state Adrian Fontes has helped mentor Matta and provide recommendations for his transition team and chief of staff.
