= Manan Ahmed Asif =

American historian

- Born: 1971 (age 54–55)
- Occupations: Professor, historian
- Notable work: A Book of Conquest: The Chachnama and Muslim Origins in South Asia; Where the Wild Frontiers Are: Pakistan and the American Imagination; The Loss of Hindustan: The Invention of India

Manan Ahmed Asif, also known as Manan Ahmed, is a Pakistani historian of South Asia and West Asia. He is a professor of history at Columbia University in New York City.

He is the founder of the blog Chapati Mystery and co-founder of Columbia's Group for Experimental Methods in Humanistic Research. Since 2021, he is co-executive editor of the Journal of the History of Ideas.

== Life and education ==
Ahmed was born in 1971 in Lahore, Pakistan. At a young age, his family moved to Doha, Qatar, where his father worked as a migrant laborer. In the 8th grade, Ahmed and his family moved back to Lahore. Having grown up abroad, Ahmed initially struggled to reintegrate back into Pakistani culture, as his Arabic was more proficient than his Urdu.

Ahmed graduated from Punjab University in Lahore with a BA in math and physics in 1991. In 1997, he graduated from Miami University in Ohio with a second BA in history. At Miami, he completed two theses, one in art history on Paul Klee and Frida Kahlo, and a second on early Islamic history with Matthew S. Gordon.

Ahmed's undergraduate thesis on early Islamic history earned him admission to the University of Chicago, where he completed his PhD in 2008. His graduate thesis centered on the arrival of Muslims to the Indian subcontinent, and the memory and history of Muhammad ibn al=Qasim as a "conqueror". At Chicago, Ahmed studied under Muzaffar Alam, Fred Donner, Ronald Inden, Dipesh Chakrabarty and Shahid Amin.

== Career ==
Ahmed's work often combines archaeological, numismatic, epigraphic, and literary evidence and focuses on the history of South Asia.

According to Ahmed, Muslim presence in the subcontinent is not to be understood as a history of conquests or religious military conflicts. Ahmed argues instead that we should recognize that presence as “lived spaces,” interconnected with each other across the region and full of particularities that must be understood in their own terms.

In 2014, he helped co-found Columbia's Group for Experimental Methods in Humanistic Research, which focuses on “mobilized humanities” and innovations in scholarly methodologies. One of their projects, Torn Apart/Separados, a series of rapidly produced data visualizations, responded to the Trump administration family separation policy announced by the United States government in 2018. The project located 113 shelters used to house children separated from their parents at the Mexico-United States Border.

== Works ==
- Where the Wild Frontiers Are: Pakistan and the American Imagination. Just World Publications. 2011. ISBN 978-1-93598-206-7.
- A Book of Conquest: the Chachnama and Muslim Origins in South Asia. Harvard University Press. 2016. ISBN 978-0-674-66011-3.
- The Loss of Hindustan. Harvard University Press/Harper Publications. 2020. ISBN 978-0-67498-790-6.
