= Chach of Aror =

Maharaja of Sindh from 631 to 671

Chach
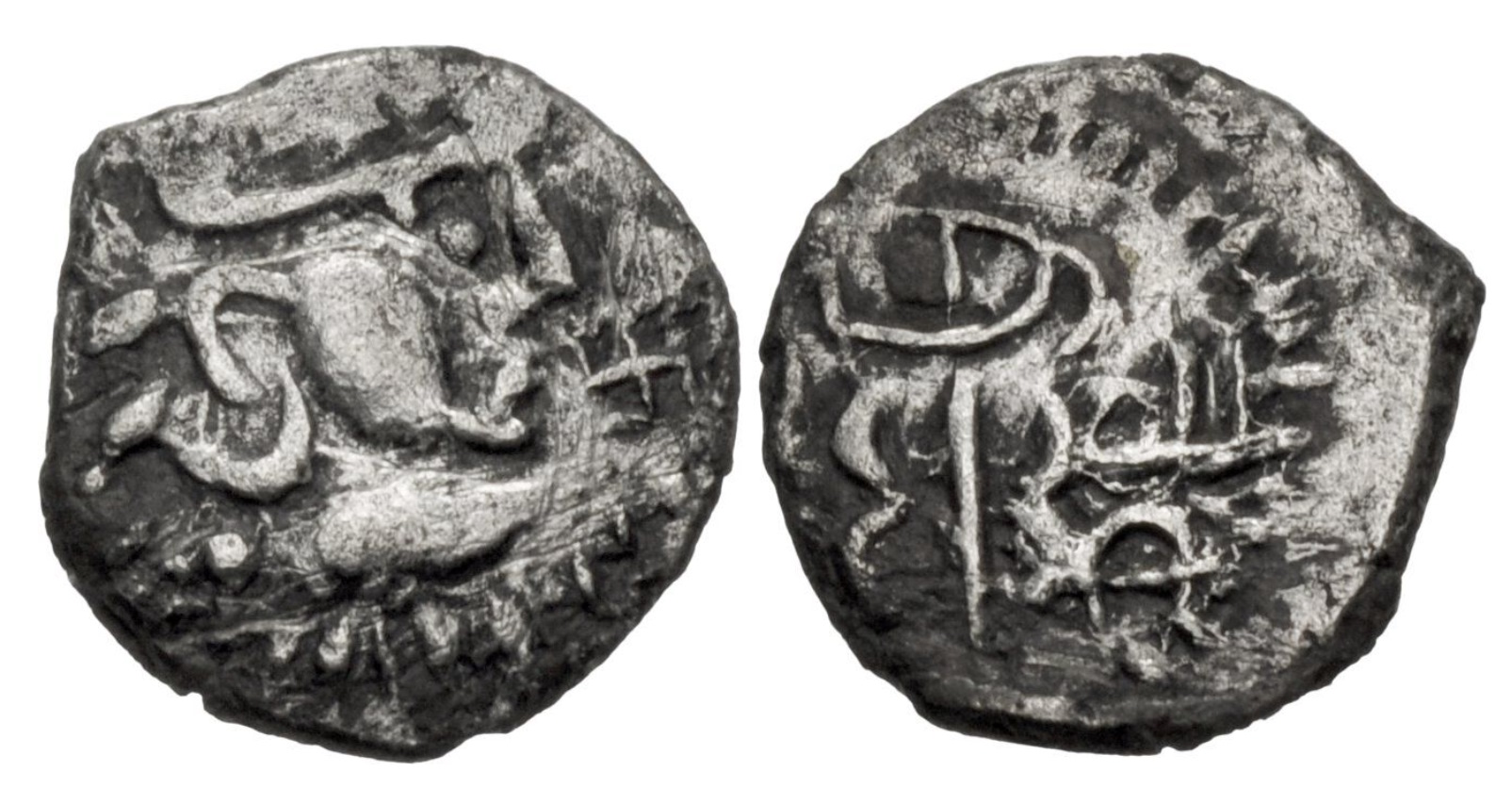
- Coinage of Chach of Alor, with legend 'Šri Yashaditya'. Circa 632–671. Sindh. Crowned head right; swastika to right. Large trident, šri yasha(ditya) around

Maharaja of Sindh
- Reign: 631–671
- Predecessor: Rai Sahasi II (Sinhasena)
- Successor: Chandar
- Spouse: Rani Suhanadi
- Issue: Dahir
- Dynasty: Chach dynasty
- Religion: Hinduism

Chach (r. 631–671) was a Hindu king of Sindh from 631 to 671 and founder of the Chach dynasty. His biography is mainly known from the Chachnama.

== Account ==
Chach was in service of the court of Rai Sahasi II and became a close confidant of the king and the queen. When Rai Sahasi died, he married the widowed queen and thus became ruler of Sindh. His ascent was challenged by Rai Sahasi's brother from Chittor, who claimed to be rightful successor of the kingdom. He marched to Sind but was killed by Chach by stratagem. Thus Chach became ruler of Sindh, laying foundation of a short-lived Chach dynasty.

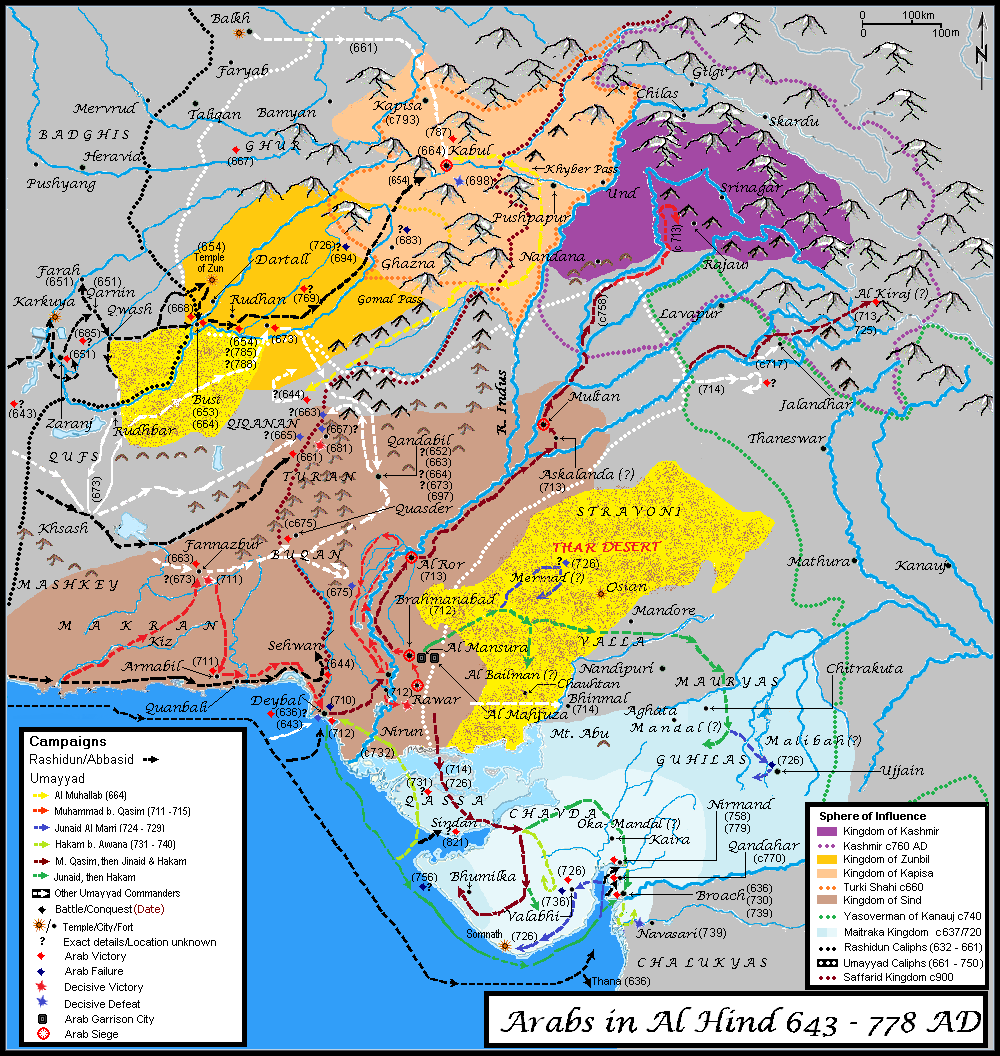
Sindh and neighbouring polities at the time of the Muslim conquests in the Indian subcontinent. Desert areas (Registan Desert and Thar Desert) Zunbils Turk Shahis Kingdom of Kashmir Chach dynasty (c. 632–711 CE) then, Caliphal province of Sind (712–854 CE) Maitraka Kingdom (c. 475–776 CE)

Chach expanded the kingdom of Sindh and defeated those who objected to his ascent. His successful efforts to subjugate surrounding monarchies and ethnic groups into an empire covering the entire Indus valley and beyond were recorded in the Chachnama. Upon his death, Chach was succeeded by his brother Chandar; Chandar is stated to have ruled for eight years, whereupon Dahir, Chach's eldest son, inherited the throne.

Preceded by Rai Sahasi II	Chach of Alor; 632–671 AD	Succeeded by Chandar
