= Rai dynasty =

Dynasty of Sindh (489–632)

- 489–632
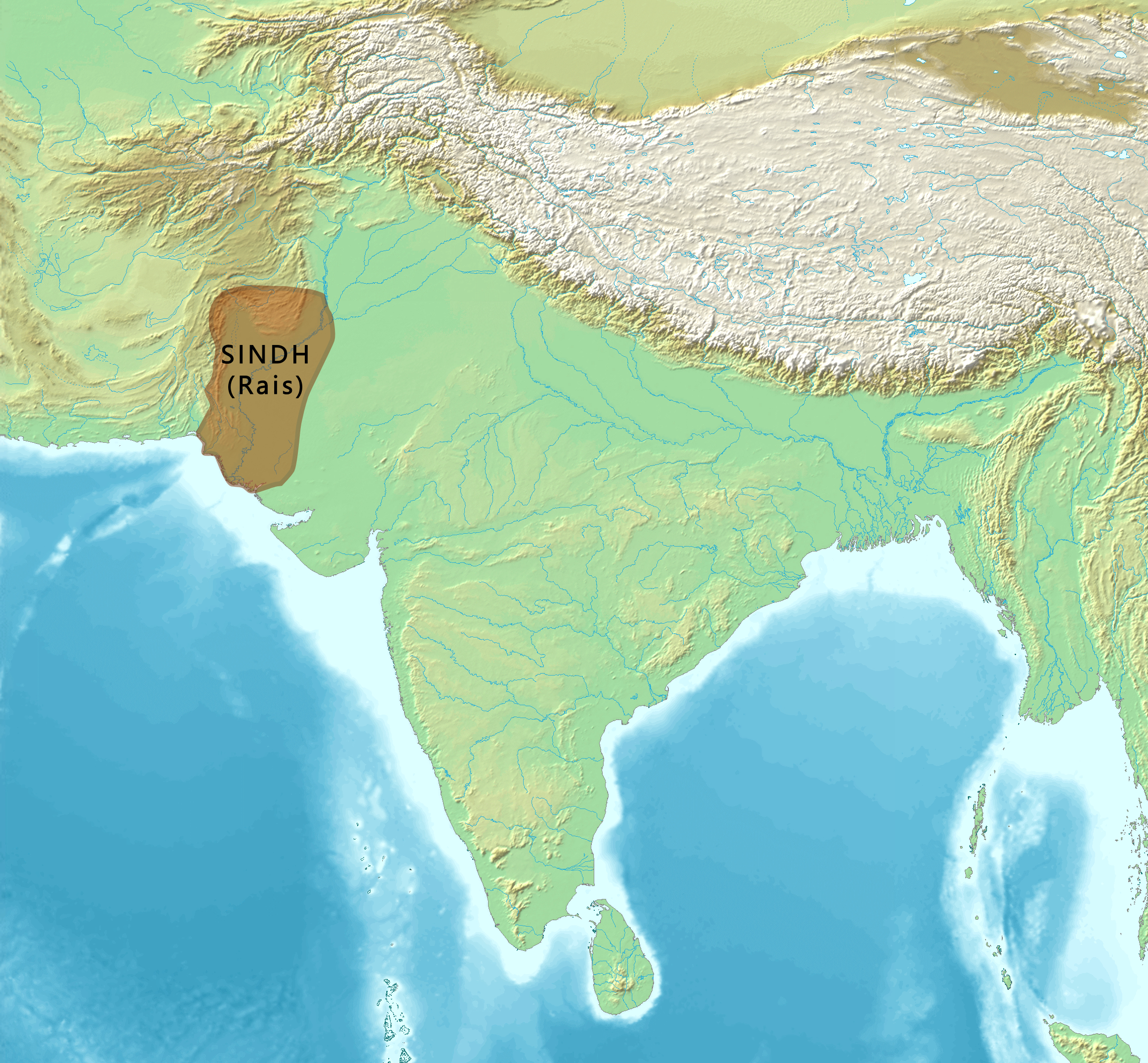
- Map of Sindh (Rais), c. 550–600 CE.
- Capital: Alor
- Religion: Hinduism; Buddhism
- Government: Monarchy
- King
  - 489–(?): Rai Diwaji (first)
  - (?)–632: Rai Sahasi II (last)
- History
  - Established: 489
  - Disestablished: 632
Preceded by	Succeeded by
Hind (Sasanian province)	Brahmin dynasty of Sindh
- Today part of: Pakistan; India

The Rai dynasty (c. 489–632 CE) was a dynasty that ruled Sindh. All that is known about the dynasty comes from the Chachnama, a 13th-century Persian work about Sindhi history whose accuracy has been questioned. Nothing particular is known about the first three kings—Rai Diwaji, Rai Sahiras I, and Rai Sahasi I. The fourth king, Rai Sahiras II, is said to have ruled over a vast prosperous area, including the seaport of Debal.

== Background ==
The Rais reigned in the Sindh region for a period of 144 years from c. 489 to 632 A.D. They allegedly had familial ties with other rulers of South Asia including Kashmir, Kabul, Rajasthan and Gujarat. As attested by coinage, the region had previously been under the indirect influence of the Sasanians, at least from the reign of Shapur II. (Note: Abundant Sasanian mints but with significant variations in typology, style, and especially, denomination, have been excavated from Sind.) The last Sassanian mints discovered from the region are of Peroz I (r. 459–484); they are inscribed with the name of one "Ranaditya Satya", who is assumed to be the eponymous local ruler. (Note: Two series of Peroz's mints—the first crown and third crown —are observed in Sindh; only in the second does this legend appear, replacing the two attendants of the fire temple.) Xuanzang visited Sindh during this period and describes the rulers as being shu-to-lo (Shudras). Hinduism and Buddhism co-existed in the realm with the Rai's recorded as building a temple dedicated to Shiva in Alor.

In 484 C.E., as Peroz I suffered an overwhelming defeat in his war with the Hephthalites (484 C.E.), the Sassanians were no more a force to reckon with in their frontier territories and new dynasties arose in many of these places. The origin of the Rais is likely to lay in this power vacuum. (Note: For a parallel, see the rise of Nezak Huns in Zabulistan.) However, their origins remain unknown. (Note: Chintaman Vinayak Vaidya held the Rais to be descendants of Mauryas and hence, Shudra, by caste. This descent was proposed based on Rai Mahrit, then ruler of Chittor, claiming to be Sahasi II's brother. Rulers of pre-Sisodia Rajasthan usually claimed descent from Mauryas, and this identification aligned with Xuanzang's noting the King of Sin-tu to be a Sudra.)

=== Historiography ===
Sindh, as a region, had no extant written histories until the late-medieval era and the sole source of knowledge about the dynasty remains Chachnama, purportedly, a literal Persian translation (c. 13th-century) of an undated Arabic text that is no longer extant. Literary sources do not record Sasanian activity and details of their actions in Sindh, and no epigraphic, archaeological or numismatic evidence for the Rai dynasty exists. (Note: Alexander M. Fishman and Ian Todd speculate a series of gold dinars and silver dammas found in the region — similar to the Ranaditya Satya mints, in deriving from Sassanian coinage but bearing different legends and different crown patterns — to have been minted by the Rais. The legends might be read as Sri Shahi Rasra(…), Sri Jayataka, Sri Harsharuka, and Sri Bharharsha some of which match, albeit roughly, with speculative reconstructions obtainable from the Chachnama — Diwaj > Diwaditya > Devaditya alias Ranaditya (?), Sahiras I > Shahi Rasra(…)(?), Sahsi I > ?, Sahiras II > Sri Harsha (?), and Sahsi II > ?. Pankaj Tandon does not find the attribution convincing.)

The narrative in the Chachnama about the Rais has since penetrated into the regional historiography in Persian writers like Tarikh i Sind in the 17th century and Tuhfatul karaam in the 18th century. However, some scholars view the Chachnama as an original work that claimed to be a translation only for political expediency and doubt the accuracy of the historical narratives contained within the text. (Note: Manan Ahmed Asif, upon a critical reading of the text, hypothesizes it to be an original work that drew on then-extant histories to imagine a romantic-nationalist past of Sindh with little fidelity to accuracy. In contrast, Irfan Habib and Jaakko Hämeen-Anttila emphasizes on unique features of the text that would have been impossible without a literal translation and rejects Asif's doubts on the veracity of the events described in the Chachnama, as does André Wink criticizing his intensely source-critical approach.)

After the British conquest of Sindh, as the colonial bureaucrats sought to justify their rule by highlighting how the deposed Muslim rulers had long-oppressed the Hindu natives, the Chachnama was accorded particular importance as it documented the origins of Muslim rule in the subcontinent. It was cited in works authored by colonial bureaucrats, especially the British Gazetteers. The Rai dynasty, being the penultimate non-Muslim polity in the region and forming the backdrop of the rise of Chach in the Chachnama, received some attention in contemporary scholarship. In modern-day historiography, the dynasty has attracted sparse scholarship except from a few numismatists.

== Rulers ==
=== Rai Diwaji, Rai Sahiras I, and Rai Sahasi I ===
Nothing particular is known about the first three kings; their names are mentioned in a single line in the Chachnama, where the Wazir Buddhiman (literarily Wise) informs Chach about the territorial expanses and administrative structure of Rais under Rai Sahiras II.

=== Rai Sahiras II ===
The Chachnama, in its opening verses, notes Rai Sahiras II to be famed for his justice and generosity; his coffers were stated to be overflowing with wealth. The kingdom was divided into four units, each under a governor or a vassal. The southern unit extended from the coasts of the Arabian Sea to Lohana and Samona, including Nerun and Debal port, and had its capital at Brahmanabad. The central unit spanned around Jankan and Rujaban to the Makran frontier; it had Sewistan as its capital. The western unit extended over a vast area—Batia, Chachpur and Dehrpur—of western Sindh; Iskalanda was the capital. The northern unit, adjoining Kashmir, was centred around Multan.

Sahiras II met his death while attempting to ward off an invasion by the Sassanian Governor of Nimroz into Kirman; he was admired for not leaving the battlefield, despite being deserted by his forces. Makran and other unknown territories were lost in the conflict.

=== Rai Sahasi II ===
Rai Sahiras II was succeeded by Sahasi II. Under his regime too, the kingdom exhibited socioeconomic prosperity; the Chachnama praises him as a benevolent ruler who always chose to abide by his counsel. He was married to Sohman Devi. During his regime, Chach, a poor, learned Brahmin, joined the imperial bureaucracy and rose through the ranks quickly, eventually becoming secretary to Rai Sahasi II.

However, as Chach gained access to the interiors of the palace, Devi, in an unfulfilling relationship with an ageing Sahasi II, began to grow enamoured of him and proposed marriage. While Chach did not consent to it, fearing incurring the King's wrath and also swerving further away from the scriptural ideals of a Brahminical life, (Note: According to the Brahminical theology of caste, Brahmins ought not to engage in worldly activities and must lead a life of asceticism.) he did acced to her request to provide companionship, and their relationship continued to blossom. Sahasi II allowed him unprecedented control in the affairs of the state until his death by natural causes; he did not have any children.

== End of the dynasty ==
On Sahasi II's death, Devi proposed that Chach usurp the throne. According to the Chachnama, he reluctantly conceded to Devi's plan and the news of Sahasi II's death was withheld from the public; meanwhile, she incited the familial claimants to the throne in a fatal internecine conflict. (Note: The claimants were asked to meet the frail King one by one. In reality, Devi had each of them imprisoned and claimed that the King had them imprisoned out of a quarrel with some other claimant. Thus, she suggested killing the other claimant to pacify the King and regain their freedom.) Then Devi proclaimed that Sahasi II, though recovering, could not hold court and, hence, had appointed Chach as the caretaker ruler for his lifetime. The courtiers were lured into supporting the coverup, and Chach ruled as the de facto King for about six months.

However, the news of the King's death somehow made way to Sahasi II's brother, Rai Mahrit, ruler of Chittor, who claimed the throne and mounted a military offensive. Chach was ambiguous about the morality of taking on a legitimate successor but was coaxed by Devi to resist. In the faceoff, he secured a freak victory (Note: Chach challenged Mahrit to a one-on-one combat, claiming his Brahmin origins had precluded learning the skills of cavalry. However, in the combat, Chach mounted a horse and beheaded Mahrit. Mahrit's forces fell into disarray on receiving the news of his death.) and went on to organize public feasts to win the approval of the masses. Thereafter, Devi had him declared as the heir to the throne, claiming him to be a man of unsurmountable intellect and bravery, and married him with the approval of the court.

According to Manan Ahmed Asif, the story of the fall of the Rai Dynasty and rise of the Brahman dynasty is, as portrayed in the Chachnama, shows how the new dynasty was established out of the intrigues of a femme fatale working in conjunction with a willing yet ethical apprentice. Chach would be subjected to protracted resistance from Bachhera, a relative of Sahasi II and governor and vassal of the Multan province, but was never dislodged.
