= Chach Nama =

Book about the history of Sindh

Chachnama
- Story of Chach
- Original title: چچنامو
- Country: Sindh
- Language: Classical Persian
- Subject(s): Arab-Sind War, history of Sindh
- Publication date: 13th Century
- Media type: Book

Chach Nama (Sindhi: چچ نامو; "Story of the Chach"), also known as the Fateh Nama Sindh (Sindhi: فتح نامه سنڌ; "Story of the Conquest of Sindh"), and as Tareekh al-Hind wa a's-Sind (Arabic: تاريخ الهند والسند; "History of Hind and Sind"), is a historical source for the history of Sindh.

The text, which purports to be a Persian translation by `Ali Kufi (13th-century) of an undated, original Arabic text, has long been considered to be the story of the early 8th-century conquests by the Umayyad general Muhammad bin Qasim. The text is significant because it has been a source of colonial understanding of the origins of Islam and the Islamic conquests in the Indian subcontinent. It influenced the debate on the partition of British India and its narrative has been included in the state-sanctioned history textbooks of Pakistan. However, according to Manan Ahmed Asif, the text is in reality original, "not a work of translation". Asif asserts that the Chach Nama is a romantic work influenced by the 13th-century history, not a historical text of the 8th-century. Some Islamic scholars and modern historians question the credibility of some of the Chach Nama's reports.

== Contents ==
The report contains an introductory chapter about the history of Sindh just before its conquest by the Arabs. The body of the work narrates the Arab inclusions into Sindh of the 7th-8th centuries AD. Thus it chronicles the Chacha dynasty's period, following the demise of the Rai dynasty and the ascent of Chach of Alor to the throne, down to the Arab conquest by Muhammad bin Qasim in early 8th century AD. The text concludes with 'an epilogue describing the tragic end of the Arab commander Muḥammad b. al-Ḳāsim and of the two daughters of Dāhir, the defeated king of Sindh.

== Historical significance ==
As one of the only written sources about the Arab conquest of Sindh, and therefore the origins of Islam in India, the Chach Nama is a key historical text that has been co-opted by different interest groups for several centuries, and it has significant implications for modern imaginings about the place of Islam in South Asia. Accordingly, its implications are much disputed.

According to Manan Ahmed Asif, the Chach Nama has been historically significant. It was a source of colonial understanding of the origins of Islam in the Indian subcontinent through the Sindh region. The text has been one of the sources of historiography and religious antagonism during the British ruled Indian people's struggles to gain independence from the colonial British Empire. The text, states Asif, has been a source of a colonial construction of a long history of religious antagonism between Hindus and Muslims, and one of narratives of Muslim origins in South Asia by various twentieth-century historians and writers. It has been a part of state-sanctioned history textbooks of Pakistan.

== Origins, authorship, and preservation ==
=== Translation of Arabic original ===
As we have it today, the Chach Nama is the work of ʿAlī b. Ḥāmid b. Abī Bakr Kūfī. He was writing in Persian, but claimed to be translating a book in Arabic, which he had discovered among the possessions of the ḳāḍī of Alōr, Ismāʿīl b. ʿAlī ... b. ʿUthmān al-Thaḳafī (who was appointed the first kādī of Alōr by Muhammad Kāsim after the conquest of the Sindh.) According to Y. Friedmann,

a comparison between the Čač-Nāma and Arab historians such as Balādhurī [...] bears out the Arab provenance of those parts of the book that describe the battles leading to the conquest of Sind; Kūfī might well have used Madāʾinī’s Kitāb Thaghr al-Hind and Kitāb ʿUmmāl (or Aʿmāl) al-Hind [...] The Čač-Nāma seems to have preserved Madāʾinī’s tradition concerning India in a much fuller fashion than classical Arab histories. On the other hand, the book also comprises a considerable amount of material which probably reflects a local Indian historical tradition. The part dealing with the rise of the Čač dynasty (14-72), the story of Darōhar, Djaysinha and Djanki (229-234), and some traditions attributed to a Brahman called Rāmsiya (179) and to “some Brahman elders” (baʿḍī mashāyikh-i barāhima) (197; cf. also 206^{14}) deserve to be mentioned in this context.

The Chach Nama survived in the following key manuscripts: British Library Or. 1787; India Office, Ethé 435.

=== Original work ===
According to Manan Ahmed Asif, Chach Nama is not a work of translation nor is a book of conquest. ʿAlī states that he wrote it to gain favor in the court of Nasiruddin Qabacha (Nasir ad-Din Qabacha). Asif adds that Qasim's campaign in Chach Nama is a deliberate shadowing of campaigns Chach undertook in "four corners of Sindh". He states that the Chach Nama is centred on the historical figure of Muhammad bin Qasim found in extant Arabic manuscripts, but the 13th-century text is different, creatively extrapolating the alternative versions. For example, the version of Qasim story found in the Kitab Futuh al-Buldan of Al-Baladhuri (9th-century) and the version found in memoirs of Al-Biruni (11th-century), are much simpler and "markedly different" in structure, circumstances and martial campaign than that elaborated in the Chach Nama. In the Baladhuri version, for example, Qasim does not enter or destroy budd (temples) or compare them to "the churches of the Christians and the Jews and the fire houses of the Magians". Further the Baladhuri version of the Qasim story repeatedly credits the monks and priestly mediators of Hind with negotiating peace with him, while Chach Nama presents a different, martial version. The Chach Nama drew upon Baladhuri's work, and others, as a template for the political history, but created a different and imaginative version of events. According to Asif, "there is little reason for us to consider the facticity" of verses in the Baladhuri's version either, an account written to glorify the martial conquest of courtly Abbasid times and composed over 200 years after Qasim's death. The Chach Nama is a romantic work influenced by the 13th-century history, not a historical text of the 8th-century, states Asif.

== Accuracy ==
The Táríkh Maasúmí, and the Tuhfatulkirám are two other Muslim histories of the same period and, on occasion, give differing accounts of some details. Later Muslim chronicles like those by Nizamuddin Ahmad, Nurul Hakk, Firishta, and Masum Shah draw their account of the Arab conquest from the Chach Nama.

Some western scholars such as Peter Hardy, André Wink and Yohanan Friedmann, question the historical authenticity and political theory embedded in the Chach Nama because of its supposed geographical errors, glaring inconsistencies with alternate Persian and Arabic accounts of the Qasim story, and the missing Arabic tradition in it even though the text alleges to be a Persian translation of an Arabic original.

== Editions and Translations ==
- Elliot, H. M. and Dowson, John. (1867). Chach-Nama. In The History of India: As Told by its Own Historians - The Muhammadan Period, Volume 1, pp. 131–211. London: Trubner. (Description and partial translation.)
- The Chachnamah, An Ancient History of Sind, Giving the Hindu period down to the Arab Conquest. (1900). Translated from the Persian by Mirza Kalichbeg Fredunbeg. Karachi: Commissioners Press. (Online at: Persian Packhum)
- Makhdūm Amīr Aḥmad and Nabī Bakhsh Ḵhān Balōč, Fatḥ-Nāmayi Sind, Ḥaydarābād (Sind) 1966. (Sindī translation and commentary.)
- Nabi Bakhsh Khan Baloch, Chachnama (Islamabad, 1983). (Annotated critical edition.)
- Harish Chandra Talreja, Chachnamah Sindh Par Arabo Ke Hamale Ka Vritant (Udaipur, 2015). (Translated into Hindi from Sindhi and Persian)

== See also ==
- Rajatrangini, similar treatise about Kashmir
- Encyclopedia Sindhiana
- Sindhi Wikipedia

== Bibliography ==
- Asif, Manan Ahmed (2016). A Book of Conquest. Harvard University Press. ISBN 978-0-674-97243-8.
- Friedmann, Yohann (1984), "The origins and significance of the Chach Nāma", Islam in Asia: South Asia, Magnes Press/Westview Press, pp. 23–37, ISBN 978-965-223-521-3
