= List of bridges in Pakistan =

This is a list of bridges in Pakistan.

== Bridges of historical and architectural interest ==
Image	Name	Urdu	Distinction	Length	Type	Carries Crosses	Opened	Location	Province	Ref.
	Chuha Gujar Bridge			91 m (299 ft)	Masonry; 12 arches	Chowa Gujar Lar; Bara River	1629	Peshawar; 33°59′45.5″N 71°37′33.4″E	Khyber Pakhtunkhwa	
	Pul Shah Daula				Masonry; 5 arches	Grand Trunk Road; Degh Nala		Pul Shahdaula; 31°54′11.3″N 74°20′23.3″E	Punjab	
	Bridge (Sabzi Mandi Road)				Masonry; 1 arch	Sabzi Mandi Road; Bara River		Peshawar; 34°00′56.2″N 71°38′48.1″E	Khyber Pakhtunkhwa	
	Kohala Bridge		Popular for picnics organized under its arch (Kohala Picnic Point)		Masonry; 1 arch	Near Jhelum River		Kohala; 34°05′48.1″N 73°29′50.6″E	Punjab	
	Attock Bridge	اٹک پل		425 m (1,394 ft)	Truss; 2 levels, steel	Railway; Grand Trunk Road; Indus River	1883; 1929	Attock; 33°52′20.8″N 72°14′13.0″E	Punjab	
	Danyor Suspension Bridge			155 m (509 ft)	Suspension; Wooden deck	KKH - Gilgit Road; Hunza River		Gilgit - Danyor; 35°55′30.4″N 74°22′20.5″E	Gilgit-Baltistan	
	Hussaini Suspension Bridge		Renowned as one of the most dangerous bridges in the world	194 m (636 ft)	Simple suspension bridge Wooden deck	Footbridge; Hunza River	1968	Hussaini; 36°25′25.7″N 74°52′57.1″E	Gilgit-Baltistan	
	Bunji Bridge				Simple suspension bridge	Indus River	1893; 2012	Bunji; 35.729781°N 74.623359°E	Gilgit-Baltistan	
	Raikot Bridge				Arch bridge	Indus River	2013	Diamer; 35°29′35.03″N 74°35′31.09″E	Gilgit-Baltistan	

== Major bridges ==
Image	#	Name	Urdu	Span	Length	Type	Carries Crosses	Opened	Location	Province	Ref.
	1	Lansdowne Bridge (Pakistan)	لینسڈائون پل	250 m (820 ft)	250 m (820 ft)	Cantilever; Steel	Saleh Pat Road–Royal Road; Indus River	1889	Sukkur–Rohri; 27°41′37.9″N 68°53′18.5″E	Sindh	(Note: Originally, the Lansdowne Bridge was railway, the Ayub bridge took over after its entry into service in 1962 and the old bridge was then used for road traffic)
	2	Ayub Bridge	ایوب پل	246 m (807 ft)	310 m (1,020 ft)	Arch; Steel through arch	Sukkur Railway–Rohri Railway; Indus River	1962	Sukkur–Rohri; 27°41′38.0″N 68°53′17.7″E	Sindh	
	3	New Khairabad Bridge		200 m (660 ft) (x2)	701 m (2,300 ft)	Box girder Prestressed concrete 111+2x200+111	Grand Trunk Road; N-5 National Highway; Indus River	2004	Attock; 33°53′53.3″N 72°14′04.5″E	Punjab	
	4	Karot Bridge	کروٹ پل	150 m (490 ft)	330 m (1,080 ft)	Box girder Prestressed concrete	Kotli Road; Jhelum River	2019	Kahuta–Hollar; 33°35′26.0″N 73°36′17.1″E	Punjab; Azad Kashmir	
	5	Khushal Garh Bridge	خوشحال گڑھ ریلوے پل	144 m (472 ft)	236 m (774 ft)	Truss; 2 levels, steel 144+92	Khushalgarh–Kohat–Thal Railway; Old Kohat Road; Indus River	1907	Kushalgarh–Bhandarbara; 33°28′50.2″N 71°54′34.3″E	Khyber Pakhtunkhwa; Punjab	
	6	Earthquake Memorial Bridge	زلزلہ یادگاری پل	122 m (400 ft) (x2)	473 m (1,552 ft)	Extradosed; Concrete box girder deck, concrete pylon 2x122	S-2 Strategic Highway; Jhelum River	2014	Muzaffarabad; 34°20′53.3″N 73°27′49.6″E	Azad Kashmir	
	7	Kund Bridge Besham		120 m (390 ft)	188 m (617 ft)	Box girder Prestressed concrete 34+120+34	Road bridge Indus River		Besham; 34°54′22.8″N 72°51′58.5″E	Khyber Pakhtunkhwa	
	8	New Khushal Garh Bridge	خوشحال گڑھ پل		373 m (1,224 ft)	Box girder Prestressed concrete	N-80 National Highway; Indus River	2016	Kushalgarh–Bhandarbara; 33°28′54.3″N 71°54′34.0″E	Khyber Pakhtunkhwa; Punjab	
	9	New Dhangali Bridge	دھان گلی پل		340 m (1,120 ft)	Box girder Prestressed concrete	Sahara Kashmir Road; Jhelum River	2011	Pallal Mallahan; 33°21′37.7″N 73°34′04.7″E	Punjab; Azad Kashmir	
	10	New Thakot Bridge			234 m (768 ft)	Box girder Prestressed concrete	Karakoram Highway; Indus River		Thakot–Dandai; 34°48′13.4″N 72°56′08.0″E	Khyber Pakhtunkhwa	
	11	Kowardo Suspension Bridge				Suspension; Wooden deck, concrete pylons	Single lane Indus River		Skardu; 35°21′37.7″N 75°33′35.7″E	Gilgit-Baltistan	
	12	Dhan Galli Bridge dismantled	دھان گلی پل			Suspension; Wooden deck, concrete pylons	Sahara Kashmir Road; Single lane Jhelum River		Pallal Mallahan; 33°21′40.6″N 73°34′04.1″E	Punjab; Azad Kashmir	
	13	Suspension Bridge (Sazin)				Suspension; Steel truss deck, steel pylons	Tangir River Valley Road; Indus River		Sazin; 35°31′55.7″N 73°30′35.4″E	Gilgit-Baltistan; Khyber Pakhtunkhwa	
	14	Suspension Bridge (Kandia)				Suspension; Steel truss deck, steel pylons	Kandia River Road; Indus River		Kandia; 35°25′57.1″N 73°12′16.4″E	Khyber Pakhtunkhwa	
	15	Khairabad Bridge				Box girder Prestressed concrete	Grand Trunk Road; N-5 National Highway; Indus River		Attock; 33°53′48.8″N 72°14′02.3″E	Punjab	
	16	Palak Bridge				Truss; Steel	Dadyal–Mirpur Road (Kotli Road); Poonch River		Khadamabad; 33°20′27.2″N 73°45′12.7″E	Azad Kashmir	
	17	New Kohala Bridge	کوہالہ پل			Box girder Prestressed concrete	N-75 National Highway; S-2 Strategic Highway; Jhelum River		Kohala–Bakot; 34°05′46.7″N 73°29′56.5″E	Punjab; Khyber Pakhtunkhwa	
	18	Youyi Bridge	دوستی کا پل			Suspension; Steel truss deck, concrete pylons	Karakoram Highway; Indus River		Thakot–Dandai; 34°48′14.5″N 72°56′11.5″E	Khyber Pakhtunkhwa	
	19	Kanchey Bridge				Suspension; Steel truss deck	Gilgit River		Gahkuch; 36°10′21.8″N 73°48′51.9″E	Gilgit-Baltistan	

== Alphabetical list ==
This is a list of road flyovers, road overpasses, road and railway bridges in Pakistan.

- Abdullahpur Flyover, road flyover, overpass, Faisalabad, Punjab
- Abdullah Gul Interchange, road flyover, Lahore, Punjab
- Aziz Cross/Rawalpindi Bypass Chowk Flyover, Gujranwala, Punjab (proposed)
- Chandni Chowk Flyover, road flyover, Rawalpindi, Punjab
- Chenab Bridge, G.T Road Gujrat, Punjab
- Chiniot Bridge, road bridge, Chiniot, Punjab
- Chund Bridge, road and railway bridge, Jhang, Punjab
- Harbanspura Interchange, road flyover, Lahore, Punjab
- Chowk Kumharanwala Level II Flyover/Jinnah Chowk Flyover, Multan, Punjab
- Gujrat Flyover, G.T Road/Bypass Road intersection, Gujrat, Punjab
- Gomal Bridge, opened in 2014, on Gomal River along Tank–Gomal–Wana Road.
- Jhelum Bridge, road bridge, G.t Road, Jhelum, Punjab
- Jinnah Bridge, road bridge, Karachi, Sindh,
- Kak Pul, road bridge, Islamabad
- Kalma Chowk Flyover, road flyover, overpass, Lahore, Punjab
- Kangniwala Flover, Sialkot Bypass/Eastern Bypass, Gujranwala, Punjab
- Kachehrti Chowk and Chungi No 7 & 8 Flyover, Multan, Punjab
- Khiali Flyover, Bypass road Gujranwala, Punjab
- Khushalgarh bridge, opened in 1907, on river Indus between Khushalgarh and Kohat, is a dual purpose bridge.
- Kotri Bridge, road and railway bridge, Hyderabad, Sindh
- Lasbela Bridge, road bridge, Karachi, Sindh
- Malir River Bridge, road bridge, Karachi, Sindh
- Muslim Town Flyover, road flyover, overpass, Lahore, Punjab
- Nala Ankar Bridge, Saghar, Talagang, Punjab
- Napier Mole Bridge, in Karachi, Sindh
- Native Jetty Bridge, in Karachi, Sindh
- Hakim Ali Zardari Flyover, in Benazirabad, Sindh
- Nishtar Chowk Flyover, Multan, Punjab
- Pul Moj Darya Flyover/Kalma Chowk Flyover, Multan, Punjab
- Saggian Interchange, road flyover, overpass, Lahore, Punjab
- Shaheen Chowk Flyover, Bypass road, Gujrat, Punjab (proposed)
- Sher Shah Interchange Flyover, Multan, Punjab
- T-Shape Flyover, G.T Road/Sialkot Road. Gujranwala, Punjab
- Yousuf Raza Gillani Flyover, Multan, Punjab
- Zero Point Interchange, road overpass, Islamabad

== See also ==
- Transport in Pakistan
- History of rail transport in Pakistan
- Motorways of Pakistan
- National Highways of Pakistan
- List of rivers of Pakistan
- List of dams and reservoirs in Pakistan
- List of barrages and headworks in Pakistan

== Notes and references ==
- Notes
- Nicolas Janberg. "International Database for Civil and Structural Engineering". Structurae.com.
- Others references
