= Raikot, Pakistan =

Raikot راۓ کوٹ
- Village
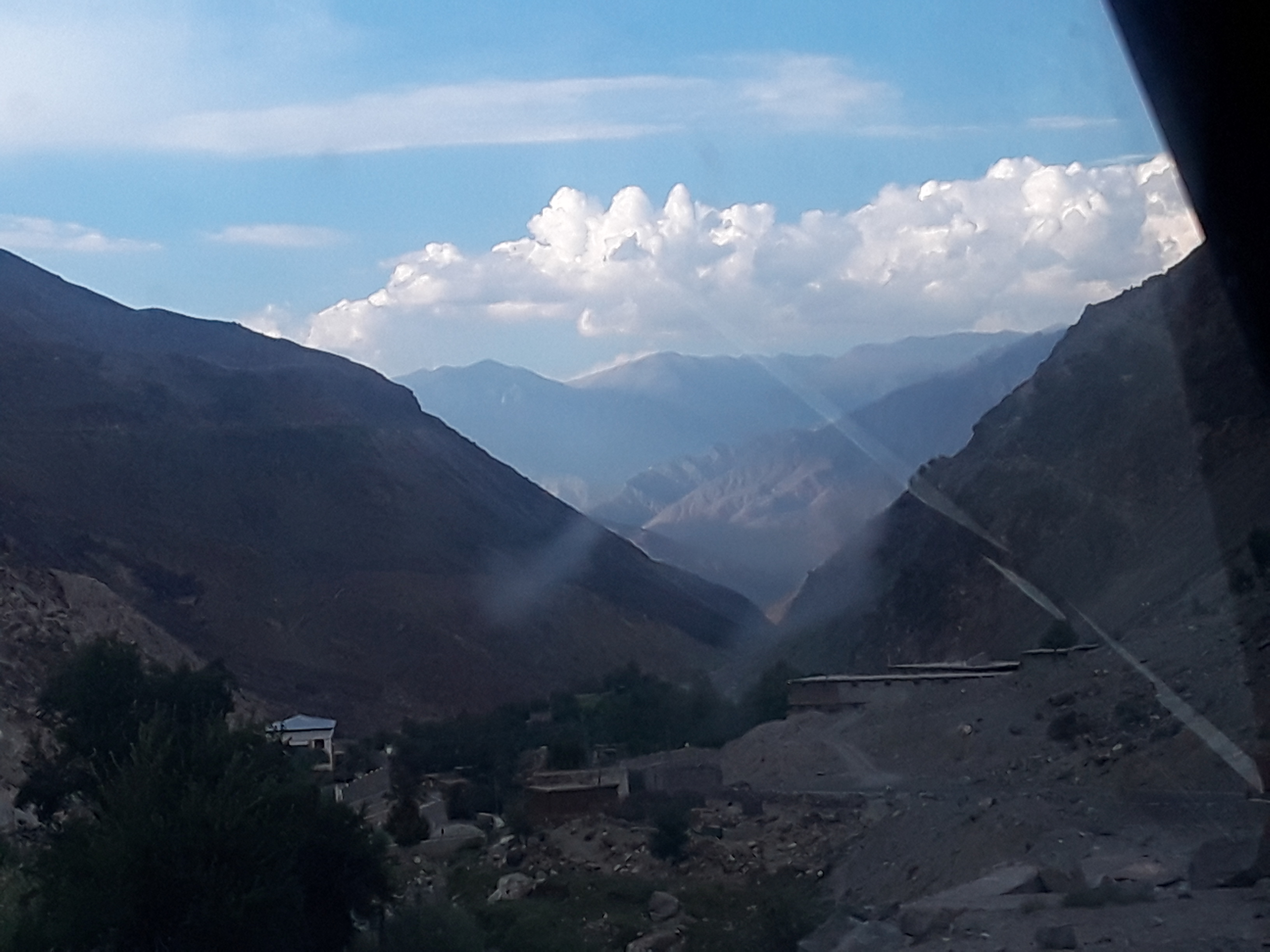
- Raikote

- Location within Gilgit Baltistan Location within Pakistan
- Coordinates: 35.49131649000408°N 74.59140287679601°E
- Country: Pakistan
- Territories of Pakistan: Gilgit-Baltistan
- District: Diamer
- Time zone: UTC+05:00 (PKT)

Raikot (Shina: راۓ کوٹ, Urdu: راۓ کوٹ) is a village in Diamer district, Gilgit-Baltistan, Pakistan. It is famous for hosting the Raikot Bridge. It is situated along the Indus River.

== Tourism ==
There are many restaurants and hotels in Raikot and is a route to Nanga Parbat. One of the most famous hotels is Raikot Serai. It also in the Fairy Meadows area, a base camp for Nanga Parbat.
