= Chiniot (disambiguation) =

Chiniot is a city in Punjab, Pakistan

Chiniot may also refer to:

- Chiniot Bridge, bridge across Chenab river, Chiniot, Pakistan
- Chiniot District, a district in Punjab, Pakistan
- Chiniot General Hospital, hospital in Karachi, Pakistan
- Chiniot Railway Station, a railway station in Pakistan
- Chiniot Tehsil, a tehsil in Pakistan
- Ilyas Chinioti, politician
- Jhang-Chiniot Road, a provincial highway connecting Jhang and Chiniot, in Punjab, Pakistan
