= Dhan Galli Bridge =

Bridge over Jhelum River, Azad Kashmir

Coordinates: 33°21′38″N 73°34′04″E

The Dhan Galli Bridge in Mirpur District, Azad Kashmir was constructed as a crossing for people and vehicles over the Jhelum River in the 1980s. The original bridge was a suspension bridge, and in the 2010s a new bridge was built as part of redevelopment/resettlement in the general area affected by the Mangla Dam raising project. This bridge was constructed at a cost of over Rs.1 billion. Construction began in 2008 and was completed in May 2011. It was opened to road users in June.

The new Dhan Gali Bridge is 340.1 m (1,116 ft), and is a pre-stressed post-tensioned balanced cantilever box girder bridge. The bridge is an all weather and all traffic facility, its construction greatly reduces travel time and there are two lanes, and the width of the roadway is 8.5 m (28 ft). The previous bridge had only one lane, and was capable of only carrying one vehicle due to weight limitations.

== See also ==
- Rathoa Haryam Bridge, another (under-construction) bridge across the Mangla Dam reservoir
