= Fairy Meadows =

Grassland area in Pakistan

Fairy Meadows فیری میڈوز
- Joot
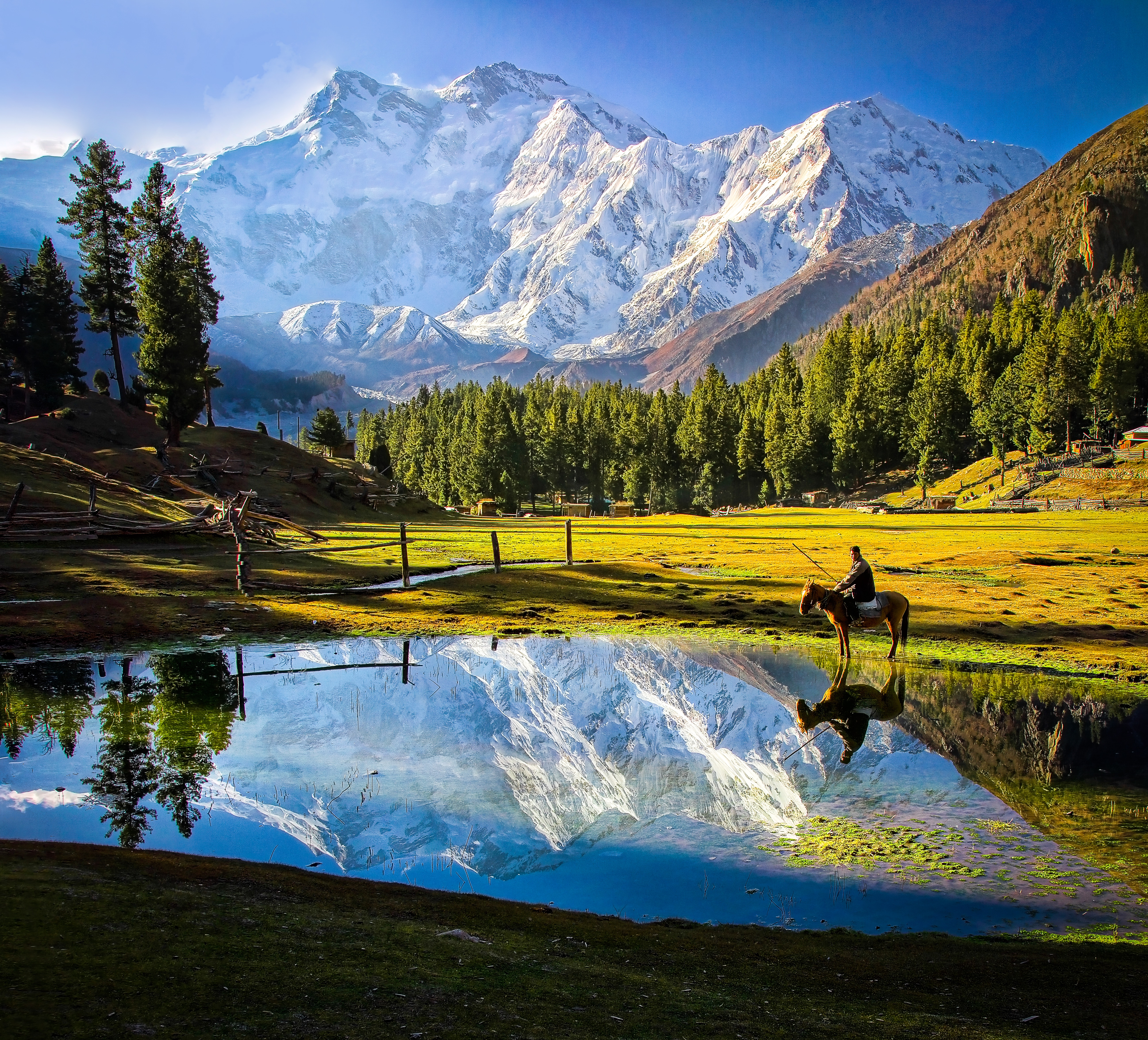
- Nanga Parbat from Fairy Meadows
- Interactive map of Fairy Meadows فیری میڈوز
- Location: Diamer District, Gilgit-Baltistan, Pakistan
- Nearest city: Chilas
- Coordinates: 35°23′12.67″N 74°35′02.98″E
- Elevation: 3,300 metres (10,800 ft)
- Established: 1995
- Governing body: Government of Gilgit-Baltistan

The Fairy Meadows, (Note: Urdu: فیری میڈوز, romanized: Ferī mêḍoz; named by German climbers (German Märchenwiese, "fairy tale meadows") locally known as Joot, is an area of grassland near one of the base camp sites of Nanga Parbat, located in Diamer District in the Gilgit-Baltistan region in Pakistan. At an altitude of about 3,300 metres (10,800 ft) above sea level, it serves as the launching point for mountaineers summiting Nanga Parbat by the Rakhiot face. In 1995, the Government of Pakistan declared Fairy Meadows a National Park. Since 2021 it is a part of Nanga Parbat National Park.

While Fairy Meadows is famous for its views of Nanga Parbat, the point commonly mistaken for the summit from this vantage point is actually the North Peak (7,816 m). The true summit (8,126 m) remains hidden behind the North Peak's massif and the Silver Saddle.

== Location ==
Fairy Meadows is approachable by a fifteen kilometre long jeepable trek starting from Raikot Bridge on the Karakoram Highway and leading to the village of Tattu (Tato). The dangerous and narrow gravel mountain road from the bridge to the village is only open to locals, who provide transportation to visitors. In 2013, the World Health Organization declared it the second-deadliest road on the planet. From Tato onward, it takes about three to four hours hiking by a five kilometre trek to Fairy Meadows. The grassland is located in the Rakhiot valley, at one end of the Rakhiot glacier which originates from Nanga Parbat and feeds a stream that finally flows into the River Indus. Since 1992, locals have operated camping sites in the area.

== Tourism ==
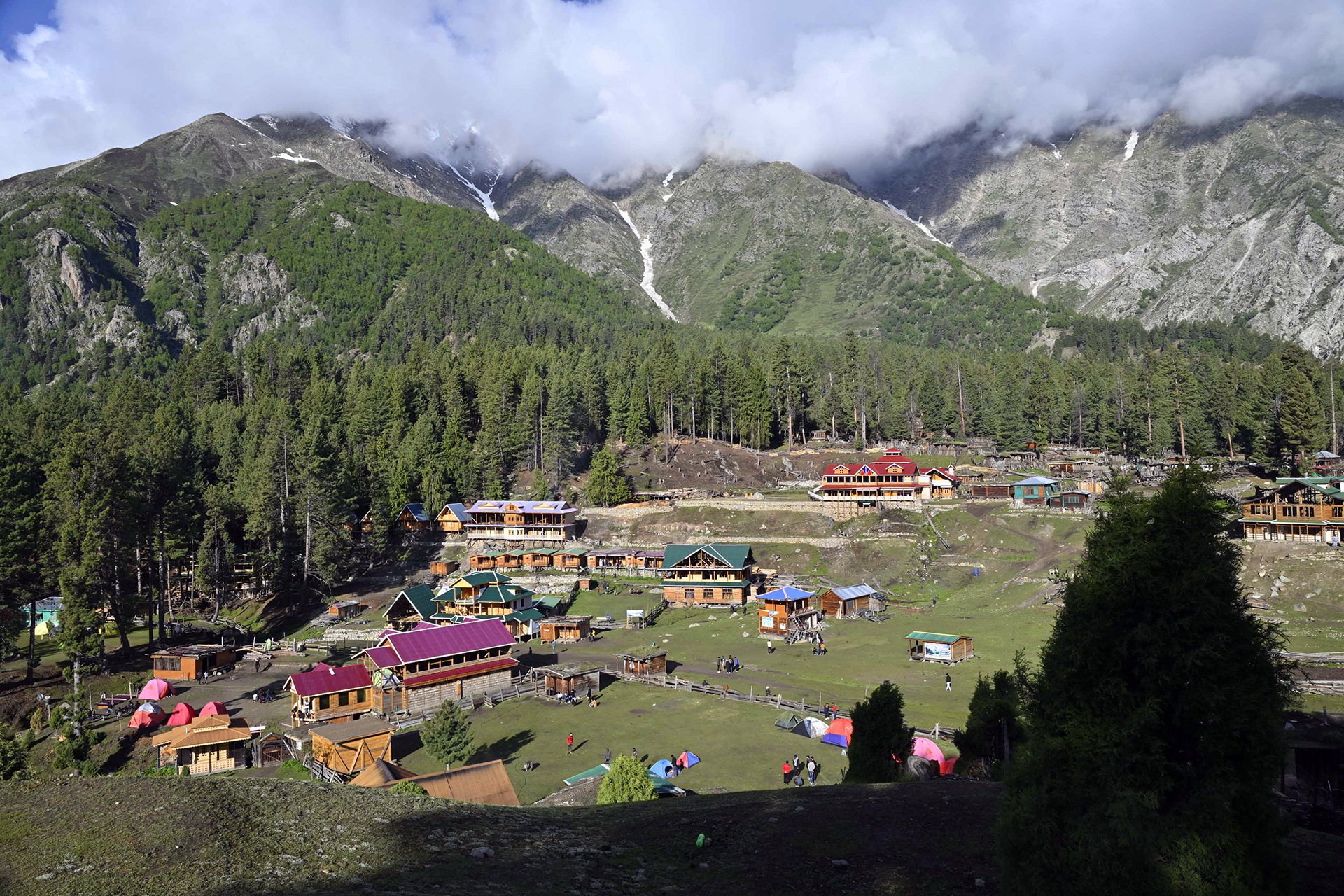
Village Scene at Fairy Meadows.

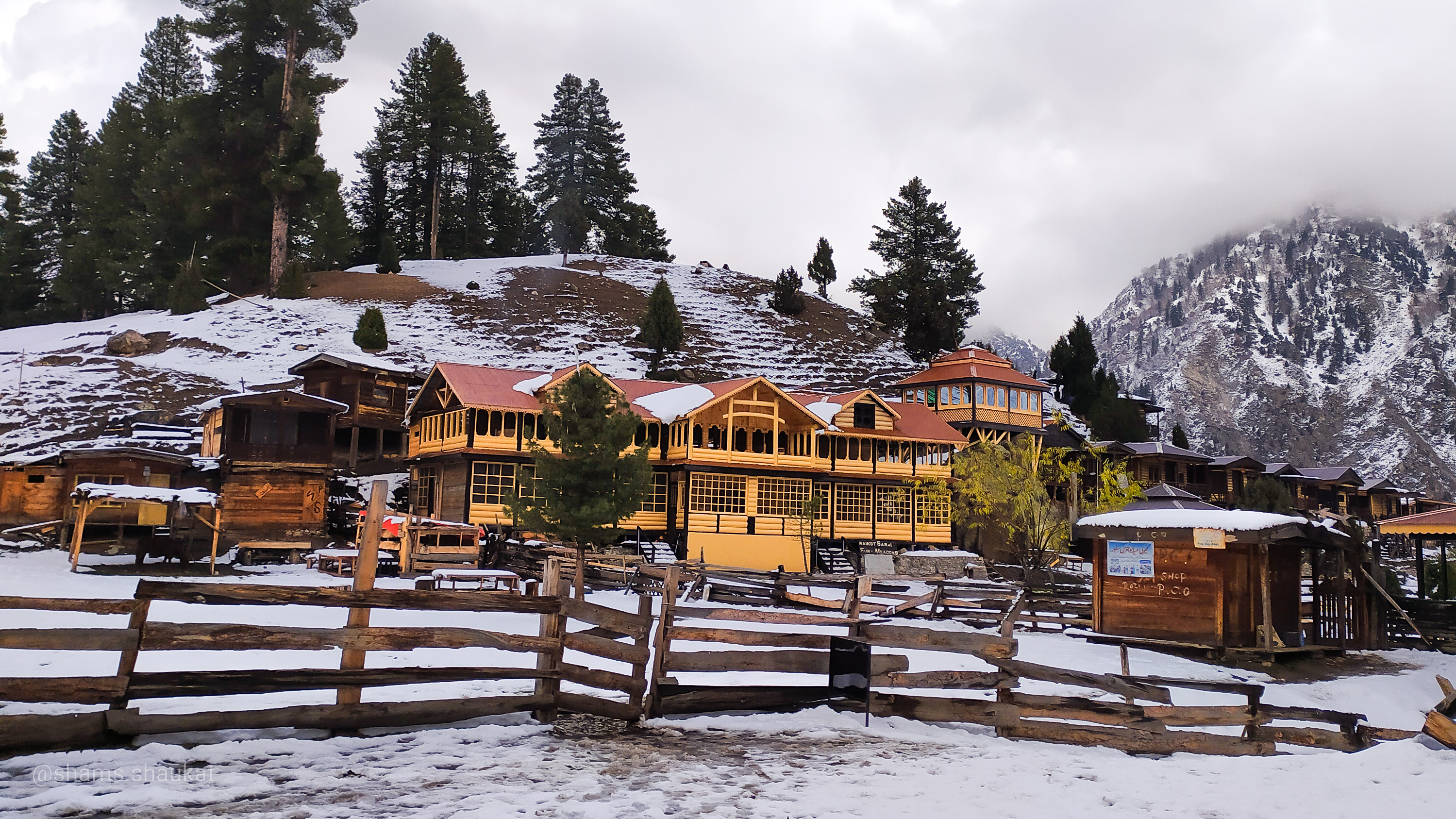
View of cottages at Fairy Meadows

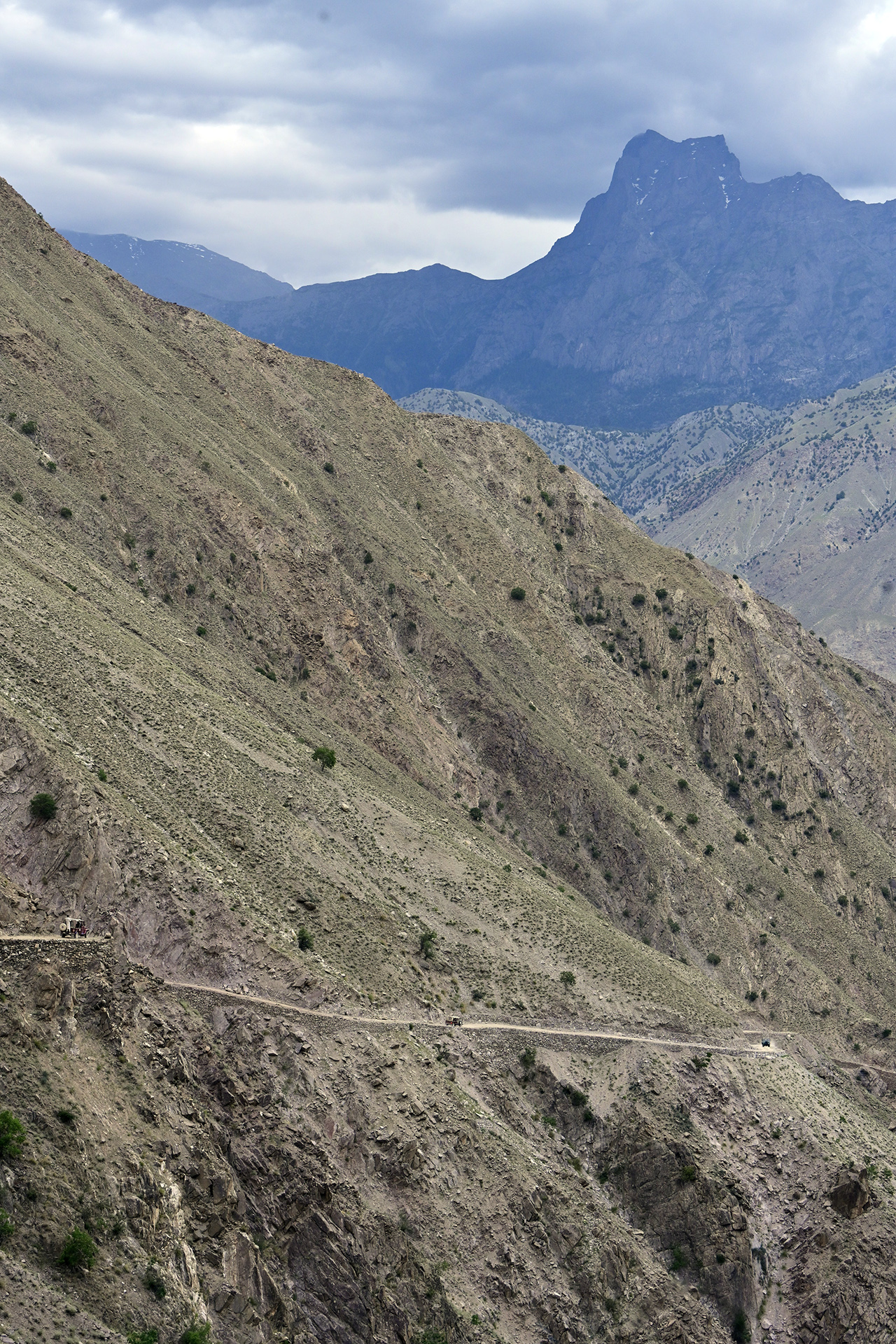
The approach road to Fairy Meadows from Raikot Bridge is considered one of the most dangerous jeep-accessible roads in the world.

The six-month tourist season at Fairy Meadows starts in April and continues until the end of September. Tourists lodge at the camping site spread over 800 hectares (2,000 acres), known as "Raikot Serai". The site of Fairy Meadows, though partially developed, generates about PKR 17 million revenue from tourism, mainly by providing food, transportation and accommodation services. The road to Fairy Meadows was built by Brigadier M. Aslam Khan (M.C, H.J, F.K), First Commander Gilgit Scouts, which today employs the locals. The local community stopped the extraction of timber to conserve the forest and promote tourism in the area. The main attraction of this place other than the meadows itself is the view of Nanga Parbat Mountain. Tourists usually hike to the base camp of the mountain from Fairy Meadows.

== Flora and fauna ==
The grassland is surrounded by thick alpine forest. The high altitude area and north-facing slopes mostly consist of coniferous forest having Pinus wallichiana, Picea smithiana and Abies pindrow trees, while in the high altitude areas with little sunlight are birch and willow dwarf shrubs. The southern slopes are concentrated with juniper and scrubs, mainly Juniperus excelsa and J. turkesticana. In the low altitudes, the major plant found is Artemisia, with yellow ash, stone oaks and Pinus gerardiana spread among it. Research has suggested similarities between Pinus wallichiana found in the meadows with a sister species, Pinus peuce, found in the Balkans, based on leaf size.

Among mammals, a few brown bears are found in the region, with their numbers declining. Some musk deer, regarded as an endangered species, are also present.

== Gallery ==
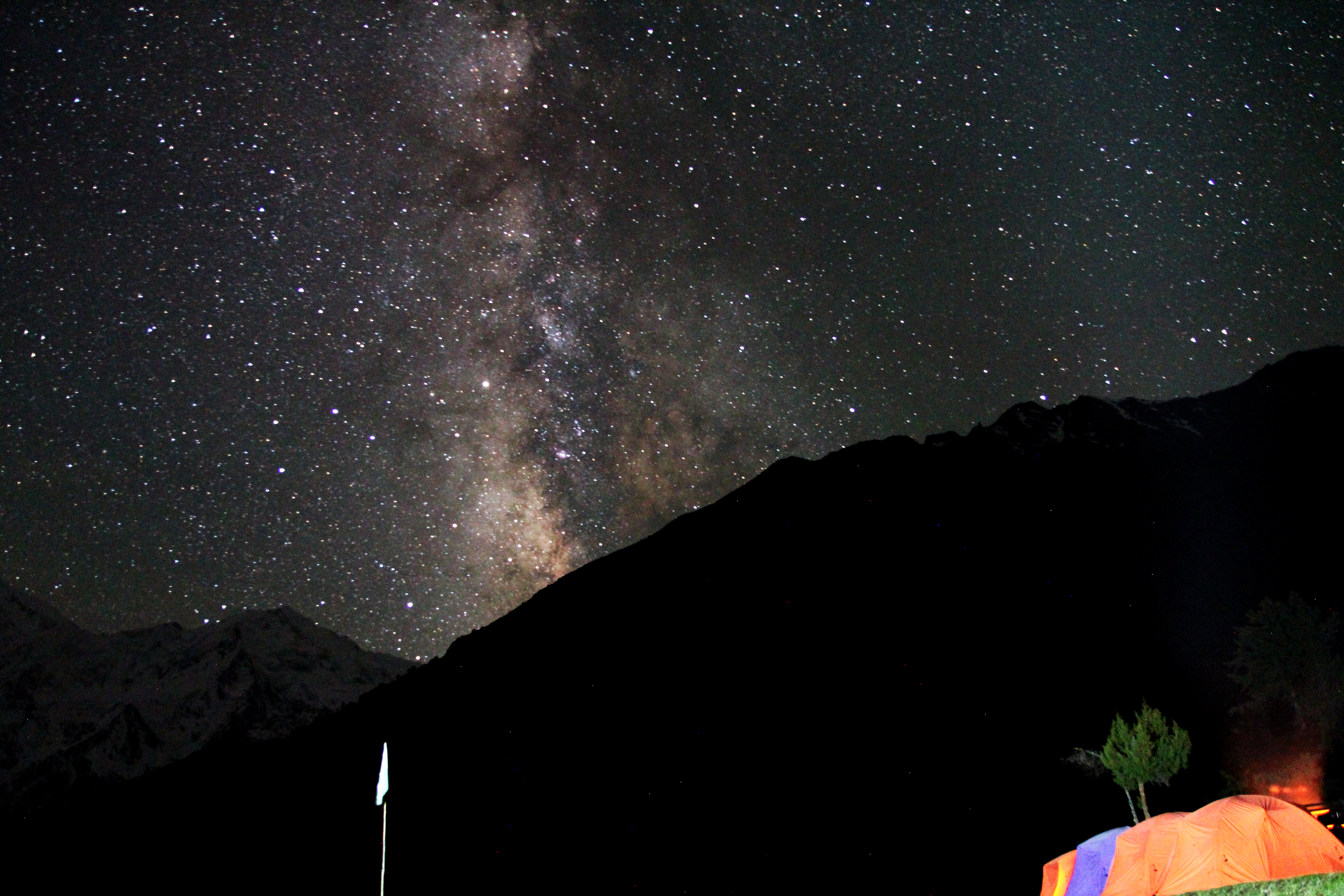
Milky way over Fairy Meadows

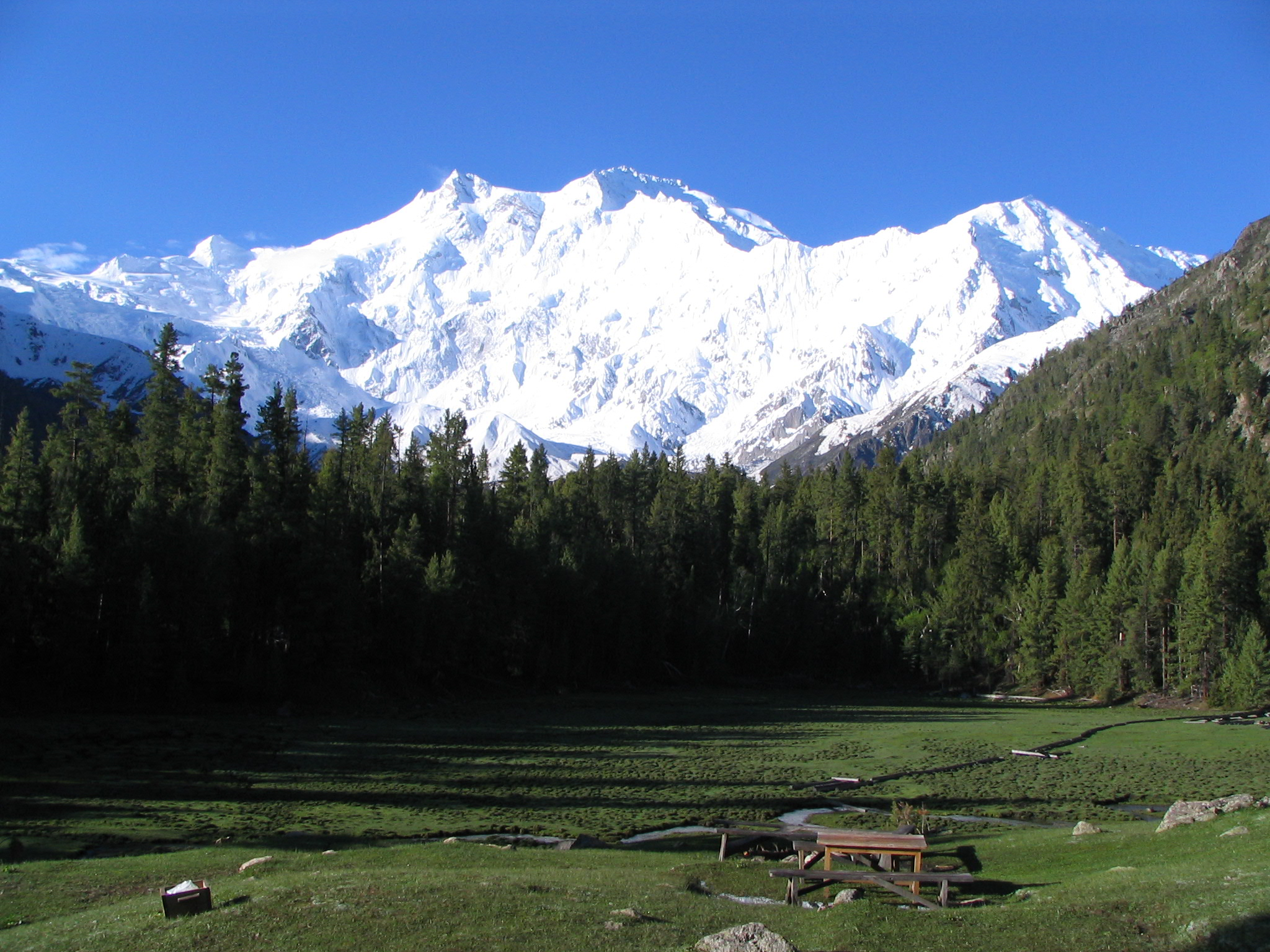
View of Nanga Parbat from Fairy Meadows

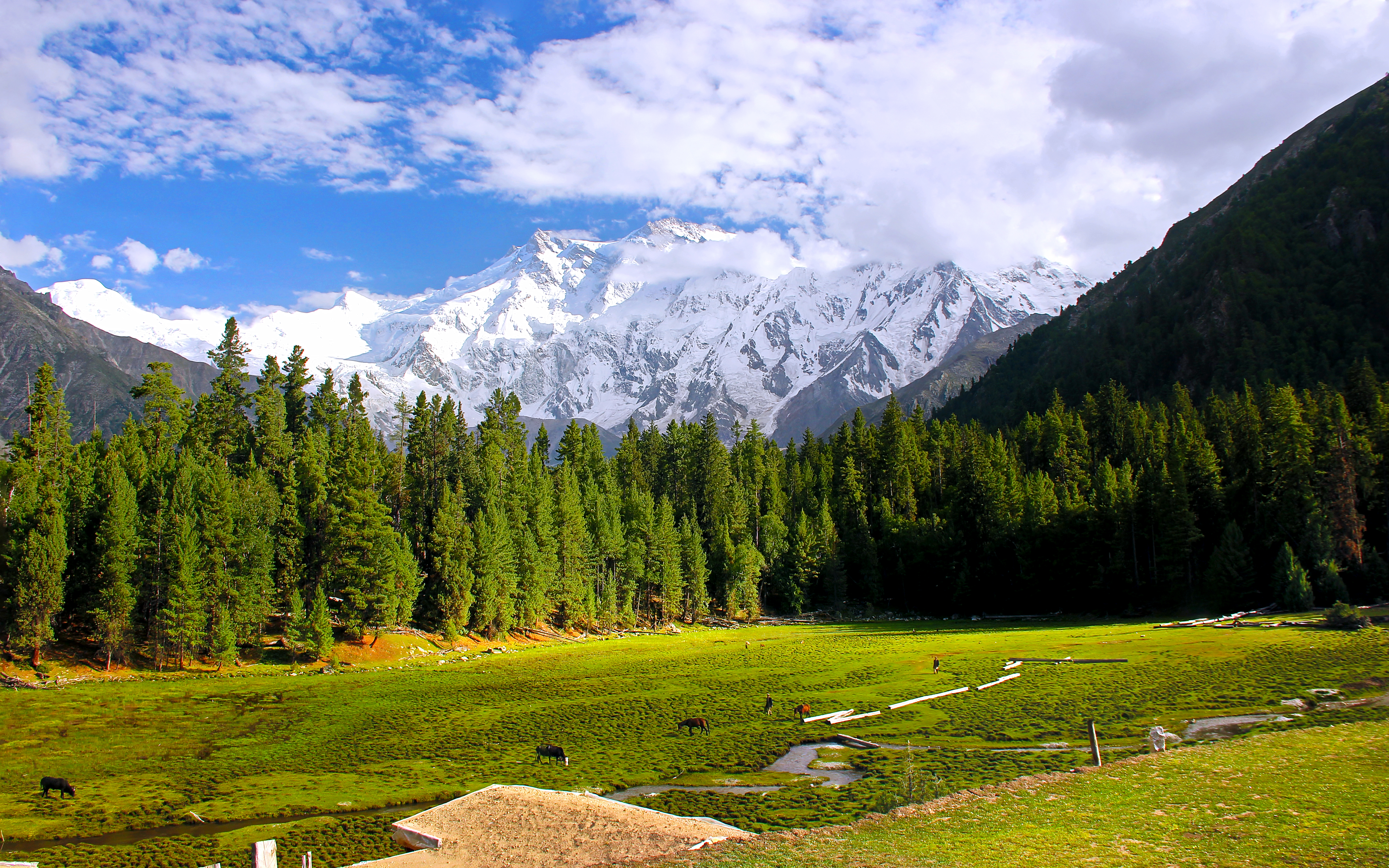
A sunny day at Fairy Meadows

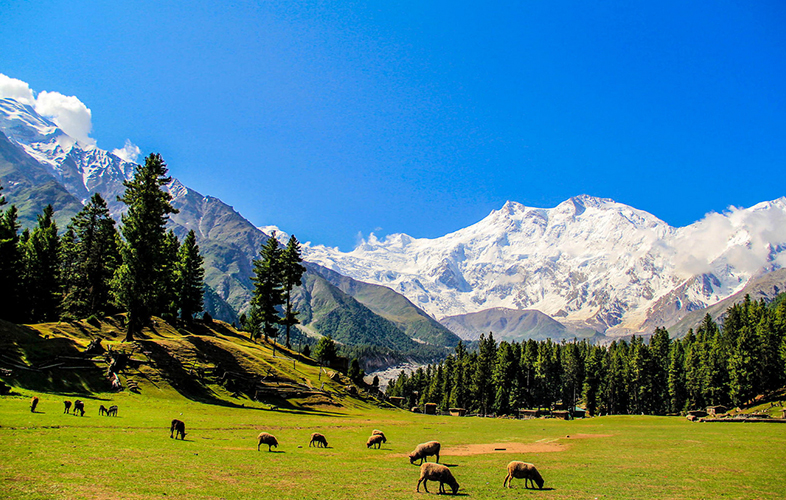
Sheep grazing at Fairy Meadows

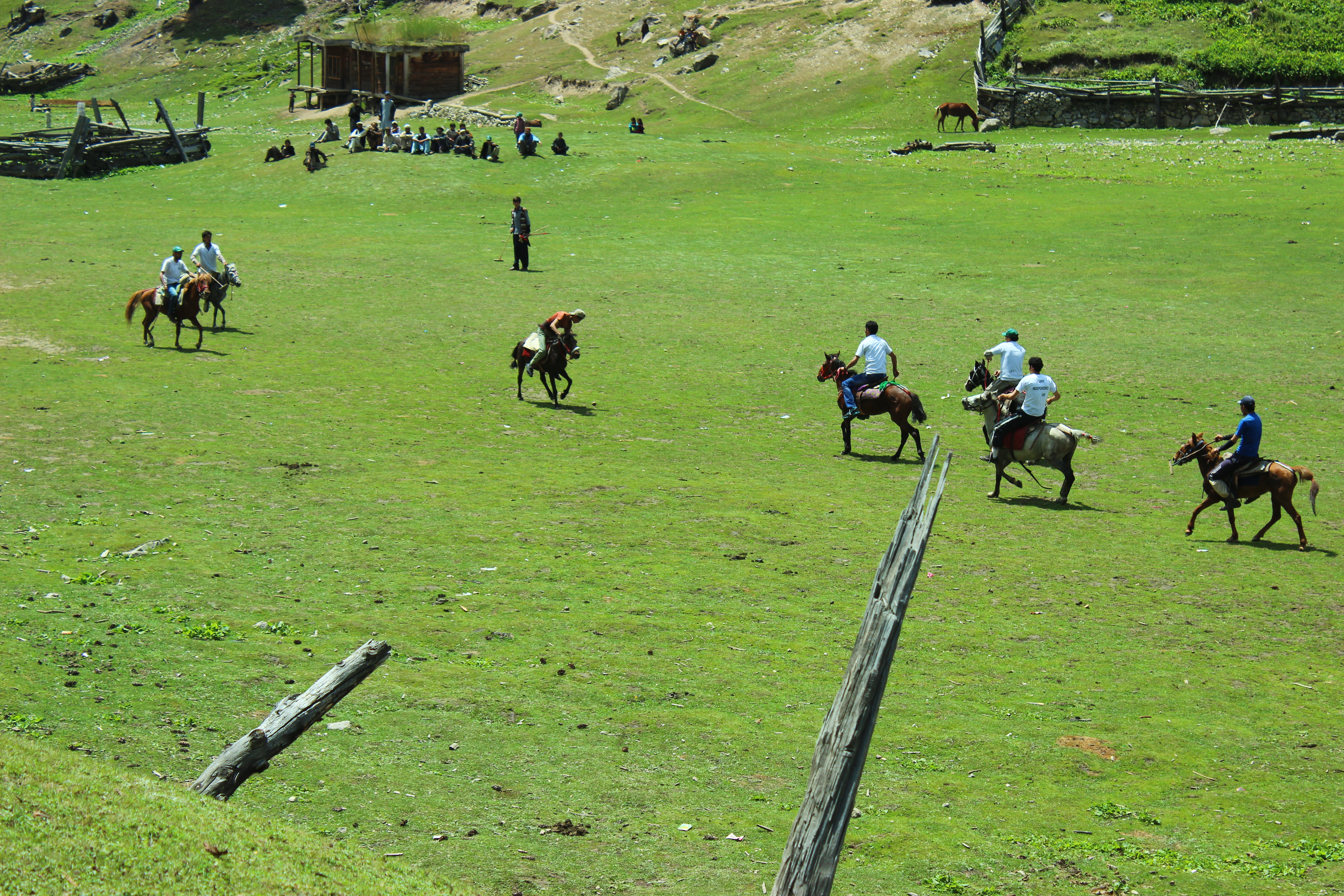
A polo Match at Fairy Meadows

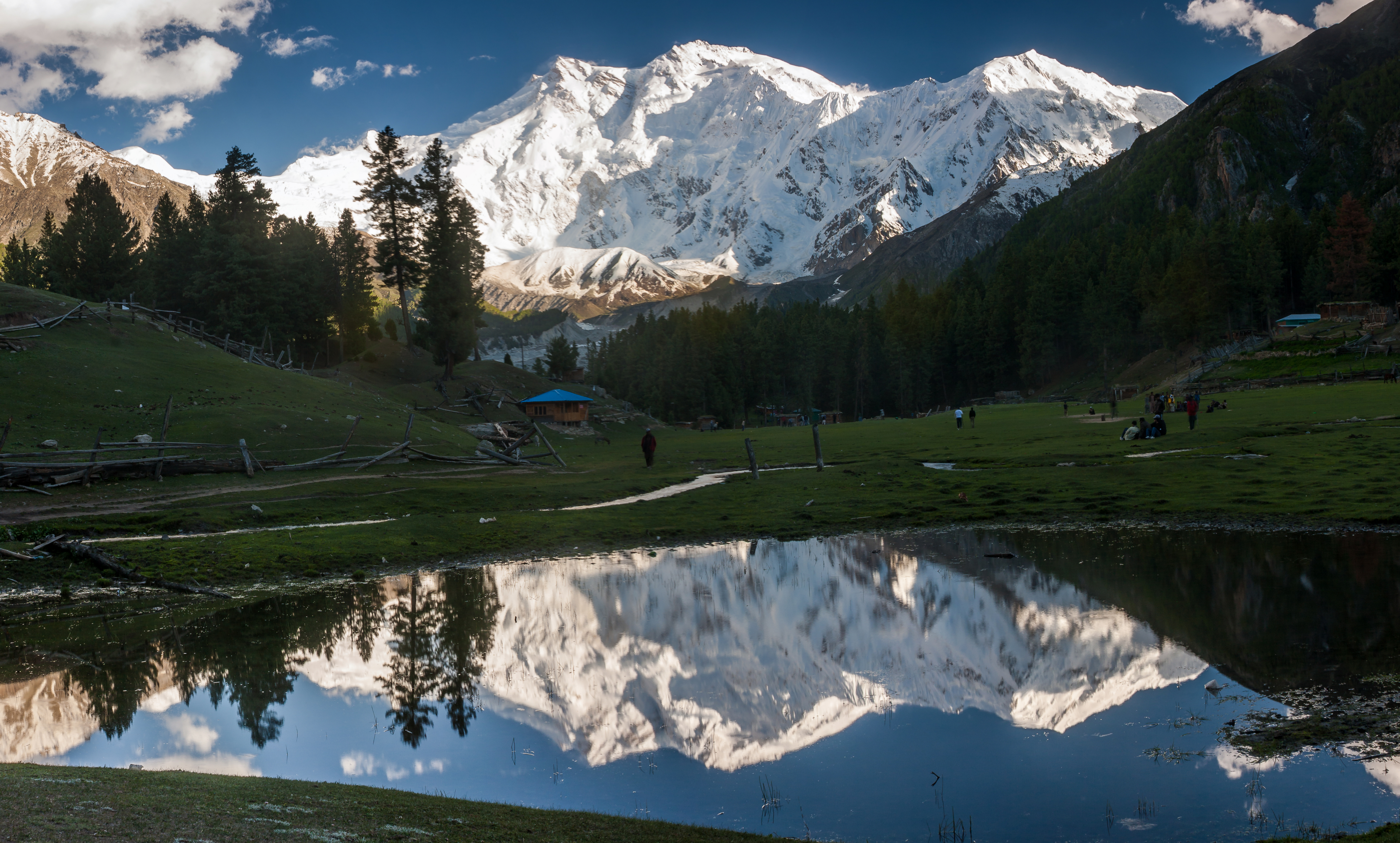
A reflection of Killer Mountain Nanga Parbat in a small lake in morning

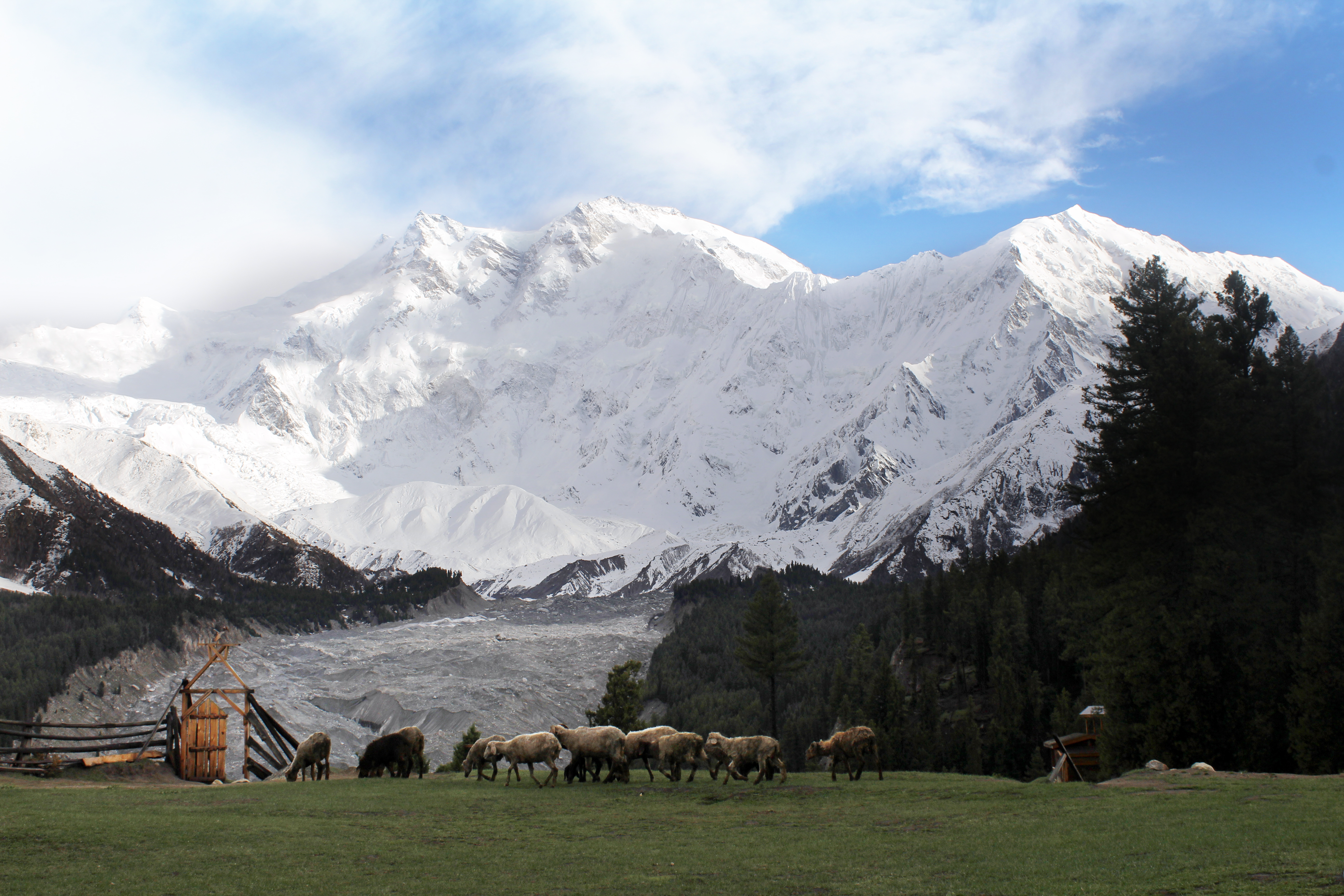
A full view of Nanga Parbat behind Fairy Meadows

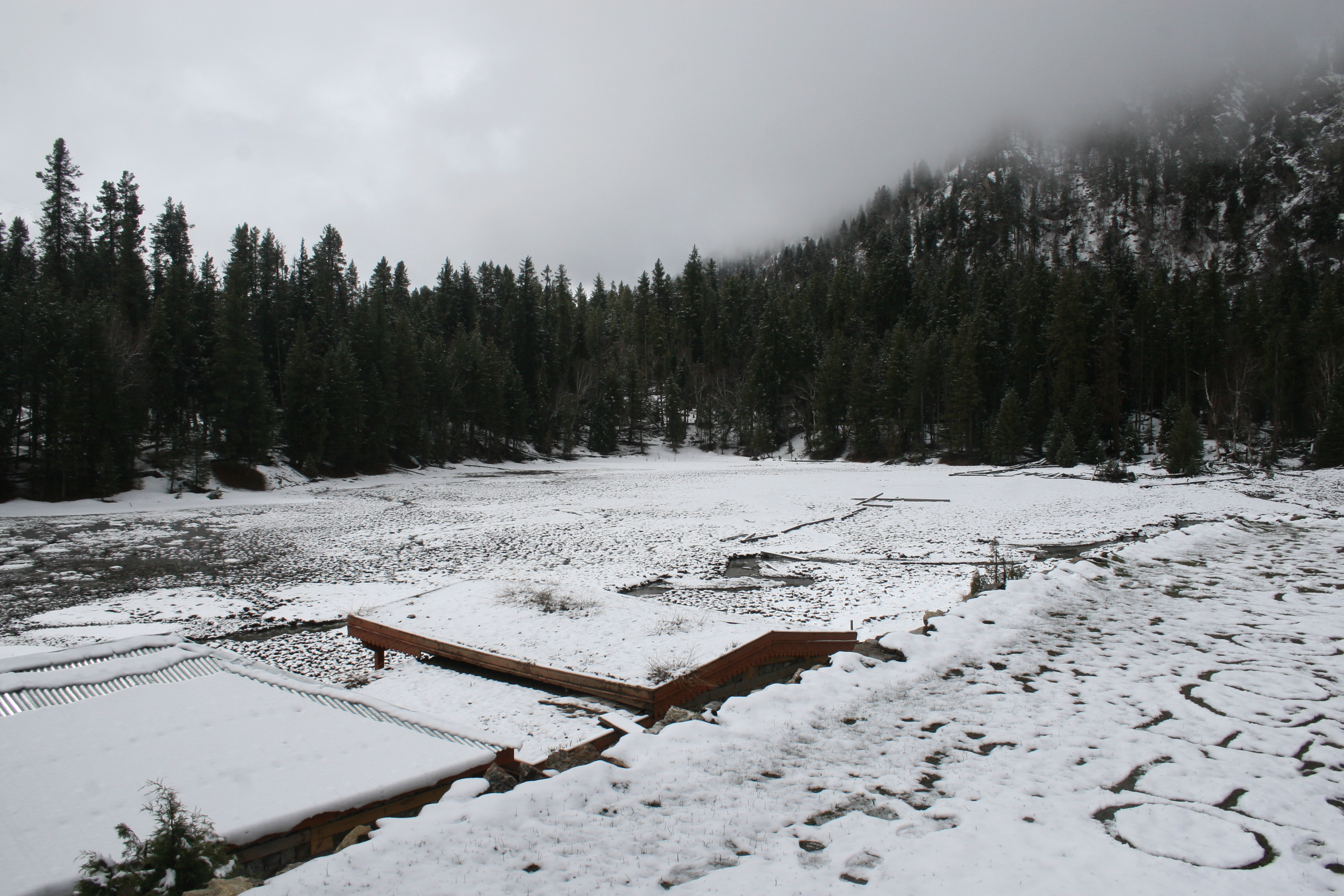
Snowfall at Fairy Meadows

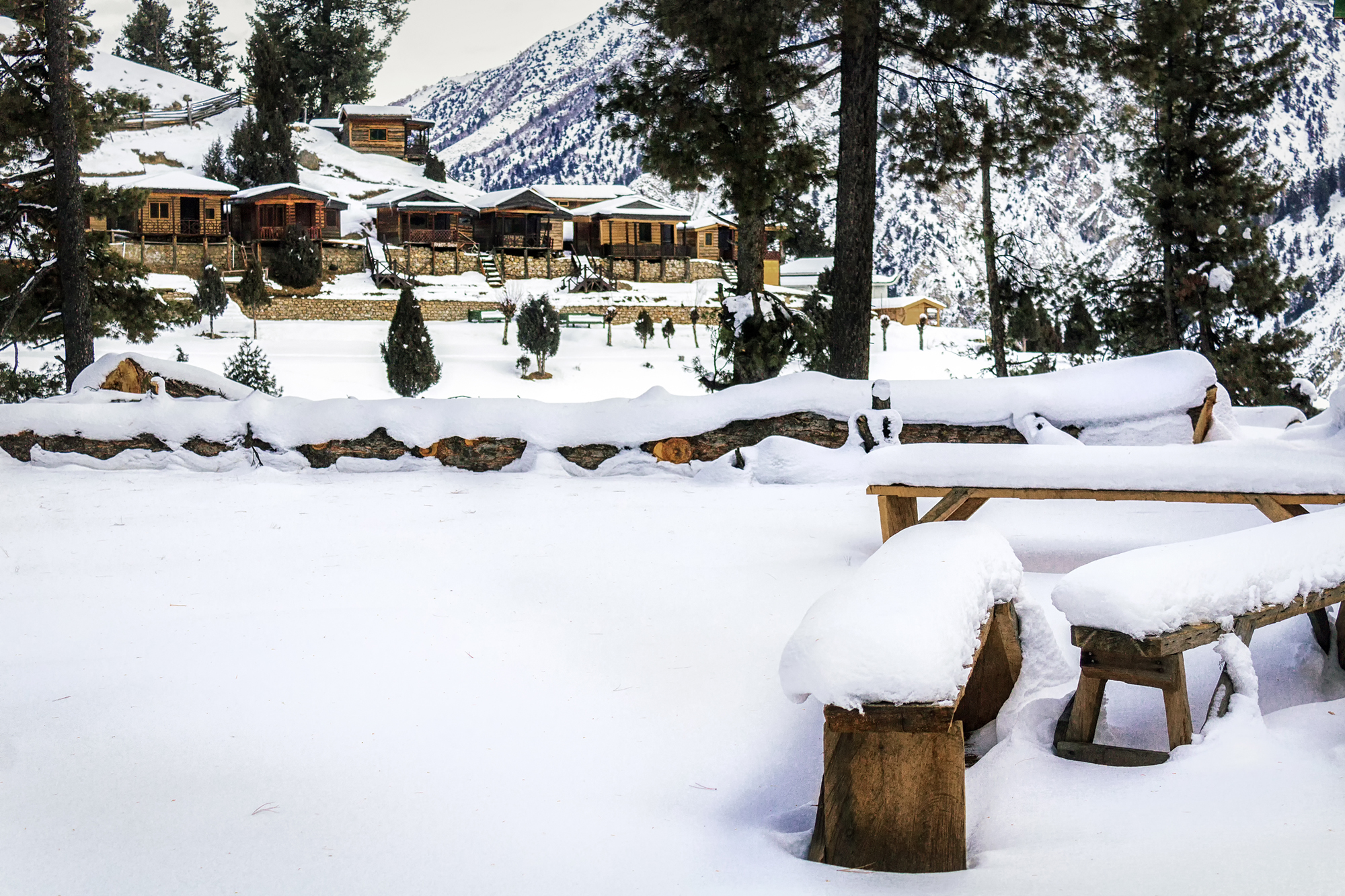
Snow-covered wooden cottages and benches

== See also ==
- Tourism in Gilgit-Baltistan
