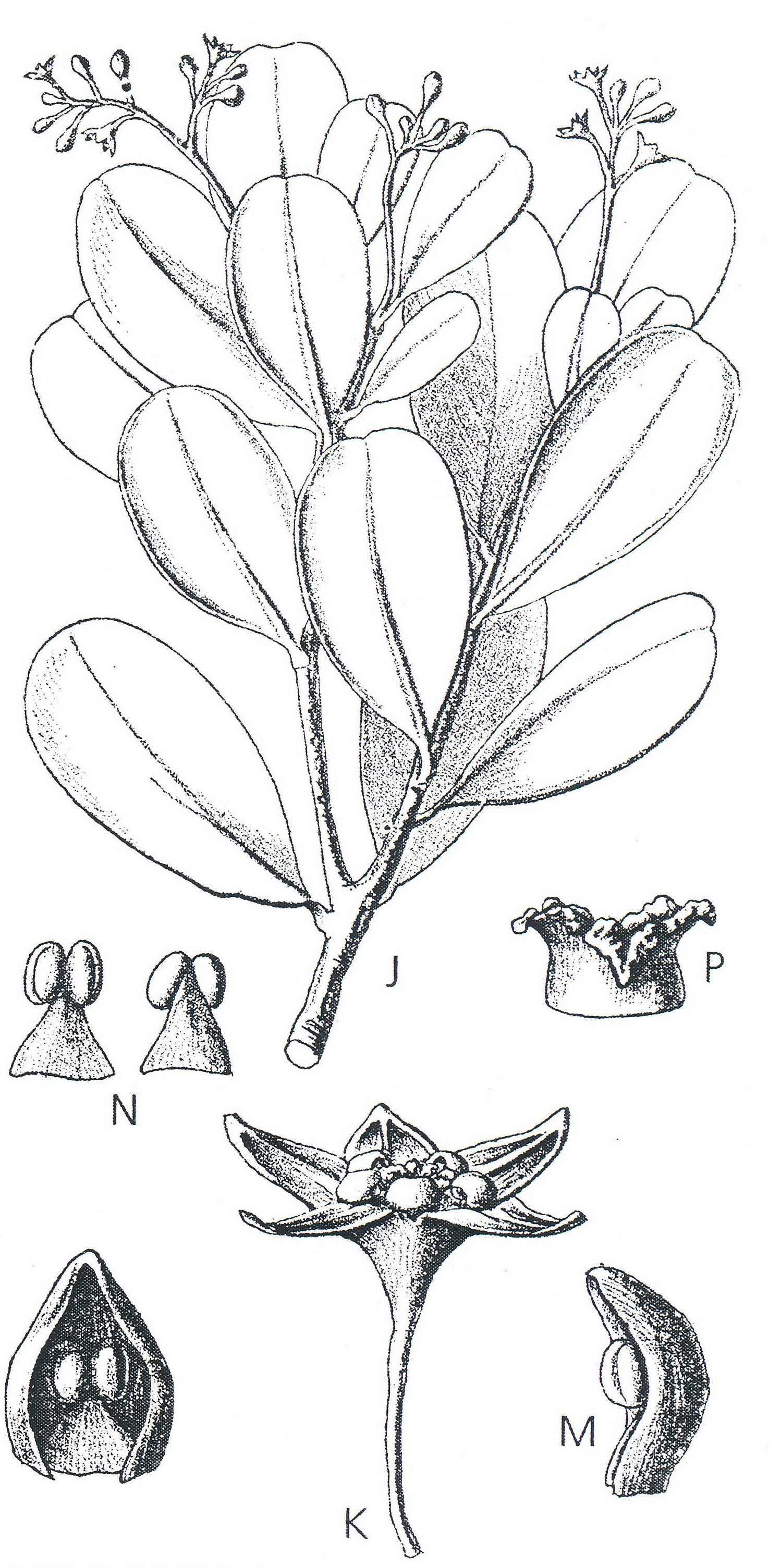

Conservation status
- Endangered (IUCN 3.1)

Scientific classification
- Kingdom: Plantae
- Clade: Tracheophytes
- Clade: Angiosperms
- Clade: Eudicots
- Clade: Rosids
- Order: Rosales
- Family: Rhamnaceae
- Genus: Jaffrea
- Species: J. erubescens

Binomial name
- Jaffrea erubescens (Baill.) H.C.Hopkins & Pillon

Synonyms
- Alphitonia erubescens Baill.

= Jaffrea erubescens =

Species of flowering plant

Jaffrea erubescens is a species of plant in the family Rhamnaceae. It is endemic to New Caledonia.
