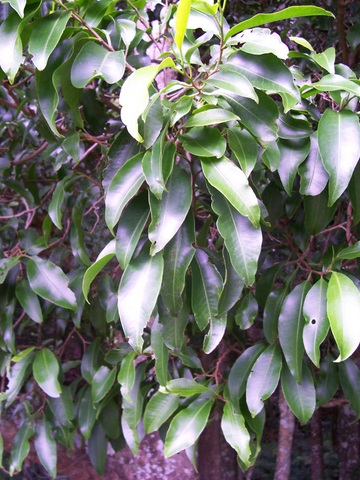
- Emmenosperma alphitonioides at Foxground, Australia

Scientific classification
- Kingdom: Plantae
- Clade: Tracheophytes
- Clade: Angiosperms
- Clade: Eudicots
- Clade: Rosids
- Order: Rosales
- Family: Rhamnaceae
- Genus: Emmenosperma; F.Muell.

= Emmenosperma =

Genus of flowering plants

Emmenosperma is a small genus of mostly tropical trees in the family Rhamnaceae. The name comes from the Greek "emmeno" meaning (I cleave) and "sperma", (seed). It refers to the seeds remaining after the fruit valves have fallen away. It is related to Jaffrea, endemic to New Caledonia.

== List of species ==
- Emmenosperma alphitonioides F.Muell. Australia
- Emmenosperma cunninghamii Benth.
- Emmenosperma micropetalum (A.C.Sm.) M.C.Johnst.
- Emmenosperma pancherianum Baill.
- Emmenosperma papuanum (Merr. & L.M.Perry) M.C.Johnst.
