= Nishtar Chowk Flyover =

Traffic-bridge in Multan

Coordinates: 30°12′2.1522″N 71°27′8.8524″E

Nishtar Chowk Flyover is located in Multan, city of Pakistan.

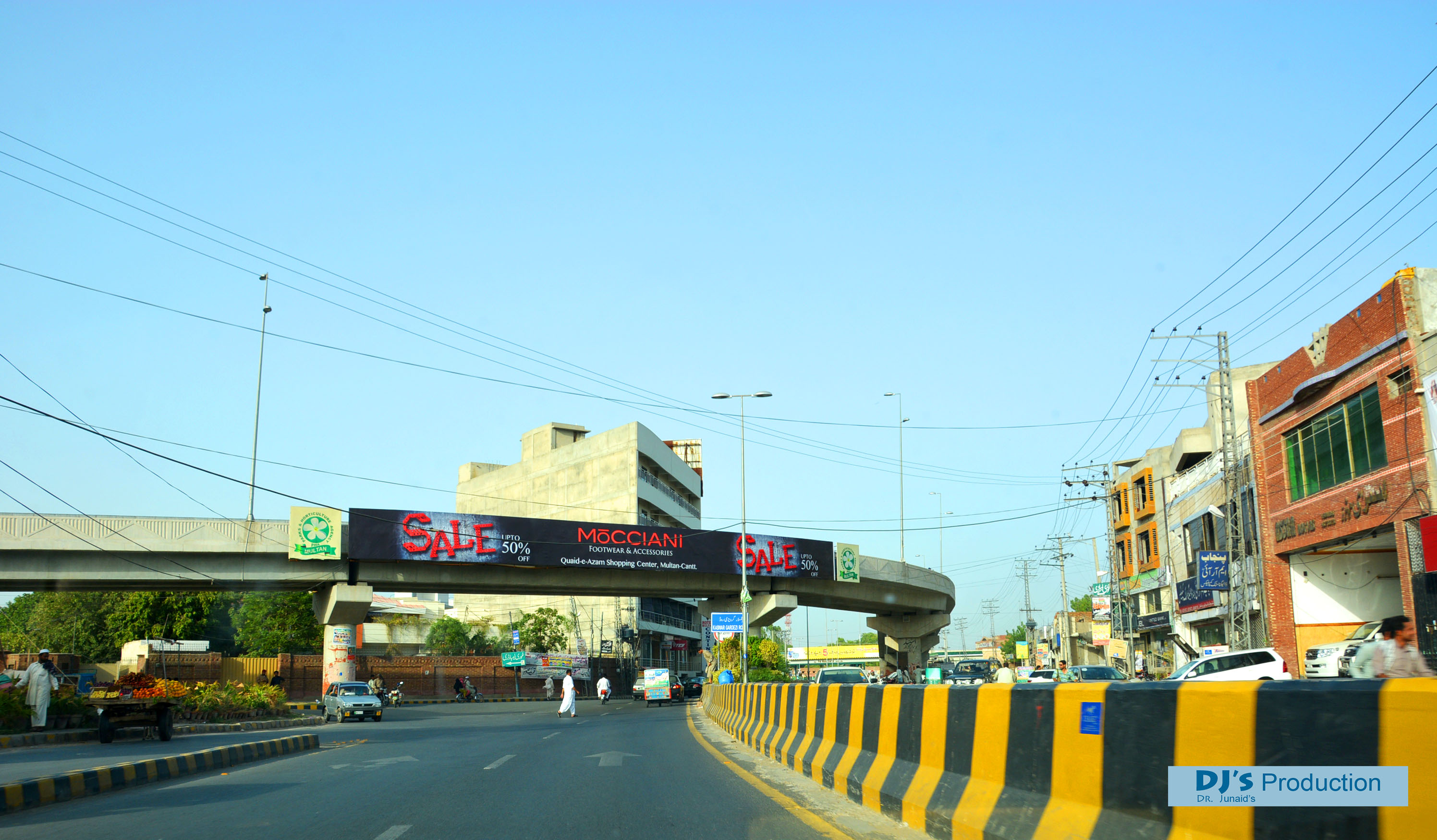
Nishtar Chowk Flyover

It is a one way flyover constructed with Inner Ring Road Multan project. It is a one way flyover made to get easy access to Nishtar Hospital from LMQ Road. Construction was started in 2009 and completed in 2011. Client of this project was Multan Development Authority MDA. It has two lanes and leads to Nishtar road from LMQ road. It overpasses Nishtar Chowk and Old Bahawalpur Road. Inauguration was done on Friday 26 April 2011 by former prime minister Yusuf Raza Gillani It was completed with an overall cost of Rs 180 million rupees. The 975-metre-long fly-over, with a width of 6.1 to 7.3 metres, starts from Pul Moj Darya and ends on Nishtar road.

== See also ==
- Chowk Kumharanwala Level II Flyover, Multan
- Yousuf Raza Gillani Flyover
- Pul Moj Darya Flyover, Multan
