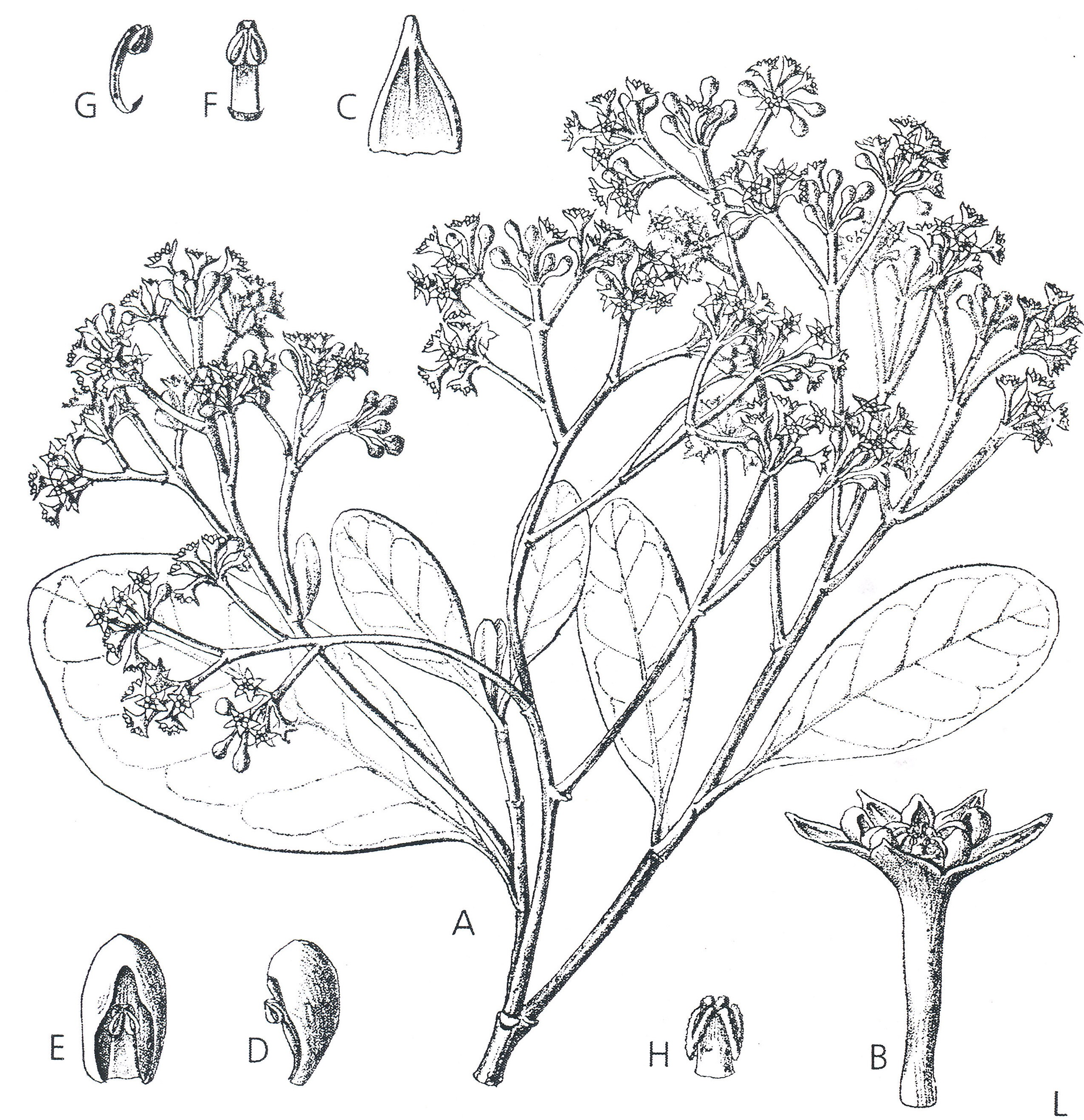
- Jaffrea xerocarpa

Scientific classification
- Kingdom: Plantae
- Clade: Tracheophytes
- Clade: Angiosperms
- Clade: Eudicots
- Clade: Rosids
- Order: Rosales
- Family: Rhamnaceae
- Genus: Jaffrea; H.C.Hopkins & Pillon

= Jaffrea =

Genus of shrubs

Jaffrea is a genus of shrubs in the family Rhamnaceae. The genus is endemic to New Caledonia in the Pacific and contains two species that were first described in Alphitonia. It is related to Emmenosperma.

The genus name of Jaffrea is in honour of Tanguy Jaffré, French botanist working at Institut de recherche pour le développement in Nouméa of New Caledonia in Oceania.

== List of species ==
- Jaffrea erubescens (Baill.) H.C.Hopkins & Pillon
- Jaffrea xerocarpa (Baill.) H.C.Hopkins & Pillon
