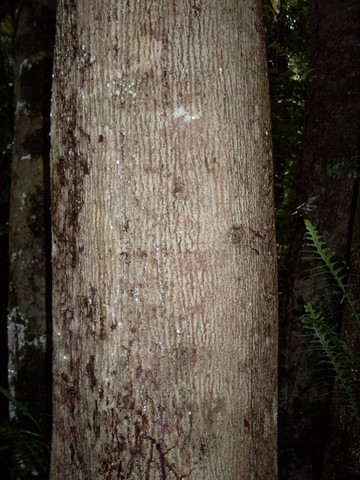
- Fissured trunk of Emmenosperma alphitonioides at Foxground, Australia

Conservation status
- Least Concern (IUCN 3.1)

Scientific classification
- Kingdom: Plantae
- Clade: Tracheophytes
- Clade: Angiosperms
- Clade: Eudicots
- Clade: Rosids
- Order: Rosales
- Family: Rhamnaceae
- Genus: Emmenosperma
- Species: E. alphitonioides

Binomial name
- Emmenosperma alphitonioides F.Muell.

Synonyms
- Alphitonia emmenosperma F.Muell.

= Emmenosperma alphitonioides =

Species of tree

Emmenosperma alphitonioides, the yellow ash or bonewood, is a rainforest tree of eastern Australia. It grows from Clyde River, New South Wales near Batemans Bay (35° S), to Cape York Peninsula in at the most northerly part of Australia. It grows in many different types of rainforest, in tropical, subtropical and warm temperate rainforests.

== Description ==
Growing to around 35 metres tall, and 150 cm (59 in) in diameter. The outer bark is fissured, silvery grey. The fissures become more evident on larger trees. The trunk is somewhat flanged at the base.

The leaves appear almost "featureless", green, opposite, not toothed, somewhat resembling leaves of a lemon or orange. 2 to 7 cm (3 in) long, 2 to 4 cm (2 in) wide with a blunt point. The petioles are 4 to 10 mm (0 in) long and smooth. Lower leaf surface paler than the top side. Leaf veins evident on both sides.

White flowers appear between August and November, in cymes of panicles. The fruit is a bright orange and fleshy, with two seeds. Fruit matures from March to August. When fruiting, the tree is easily identified by masses of orange drupes. The use of a file is recommended to weaken the seed shell, to assist germination.
