= Yousuf Raza Gillani Flyover =

Flyover located in Pakistan

Coordinates: 30°10′57″N 71°26′28″E

Yousuf Raza Gillani Flyover is located in Multan city of Pakistan. Ground breaking of this flyover was done by former prime minister of Pakistan Yousuf Raza Gillani at the new year ceremony on Saturday, 31 December 2011. It was built at a cost of around Rs. 1.6 billion rupees. It is part of the Inner Ring Road Multan project. It is a four-lane flyover with partitions. Two one ways of two lanes each. Length of the flyover is 1.6 km (excluding length of extra three ramps). There are three extra ramps connecting to the main flyover.

== Records ==
It is largest flyover in Punjab province of Pakistan and the third largest in Pakistan.

== Ramps ==
- Two main ramps.
- One extra entry ramp from Aziz Hotel Chowk.
- One extra exit ramp towards Aziz Hotel Chowk.
- One extra exit ramp for Vihari Road.

It starts from Bomanji Chowk and overpasses multiple traffic points and railway lines namely

- Aziz Hotel Chowk
- Railway lines at Multan Cantonment Railway Station
- Chowk Double Phatak

It will connect to the M-4 Motorway via Old Shujabad road, once the motorway section will be completed

== See also ==
- Chowk Kumharanwala Level II Flyover, Multan
- Pul Moj Darya Flyover, Multan
- Nishtar Chowk Flyover, Multan
- List of flyovers in Lahore
