= Raikot Bridge =

Bridge in Diamer District, Pakistan

Raikot Bridge رائے کوٹ پل
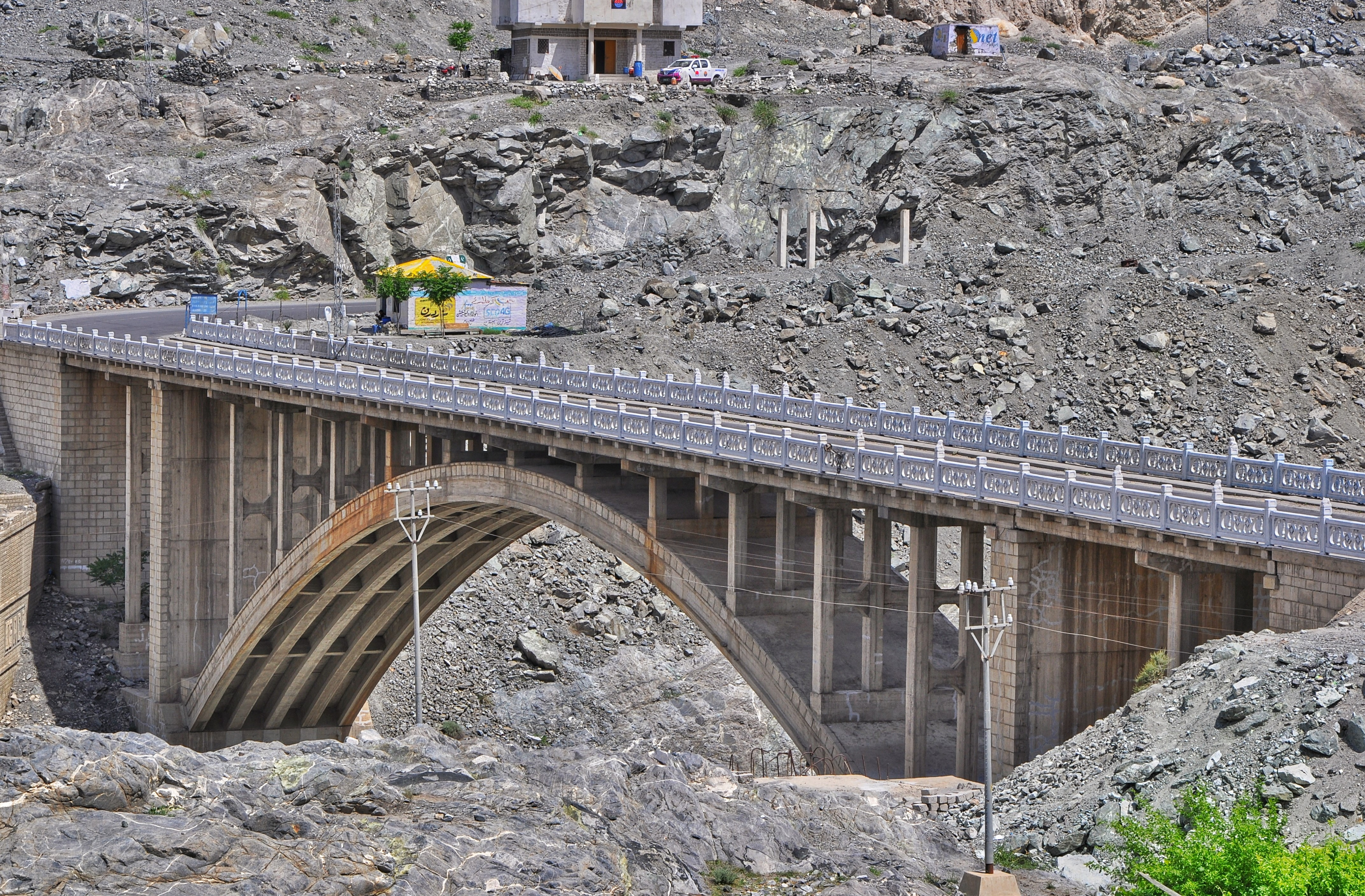
- Coordinates: 35°29′35.03″N 74°35′31.09″E
- Carries: Cars, buses, trucks, jeeps
- Crosses: River Indus
- Locale: Diamer District
- Maintained by: National Highway Authority

Characteristics
- Design: Arch bridge
- No. of lanes: 2

Raikot Bridge is a road bridge situated on the Karakoram Highway (KKH), spanning the River Indus. It is the gateway to Nanga Parbat base camp, in Diamer District, Gilgit Baltistan, Pakistan.

From there, the KKH continues all the way up to Khunjerab Pass and into China. Alternatively, tourists can hire jeeps from the bridge and follow an unmetalled track to Tattu Village, a journey which takes around 90 minutes. A further three-hour hike takes one to the Fairy Meadows National Park.

== Services ==
A small junction village is located around the bridge. It houses a few hotels, several small shops and restaurants, and a mosque.

== Upgrades ==
On January 18, 2008, China Eximbank and the Government of Pakistan signed a $327,740,000 loan agreement for the Karakoram Highway Improvement (Raikot-Khunjerab Section) Project. This project, also known as the KKH Upgrade Project, involved the upgrading of a 335 km segment of the KKH between Raikot and Khunjerab. This segment was widened from 10 to 30 meters, making it suitable for heavy and long vehicles and allowing it to remain functional throughout the year. 32 new bridges were also constructed, while 27 were rehabilitated. The total cost of the project was $491 million. The China Road and Bridge Corporation (CRBC) and Pakistan's National Highway Authority (NHA) were responsible for implementation of the project, while National Engineering Services Pakistan (NESPAK) served as a consultant for the project.

A groundbreaking ceremony was held on February 16, 2008, after which construction began on August 1, 2008. The project was successfully completed on November 30, 2013. The road work was designed and constructed in accordance with China's three-level highway standard. Final inspection of the project was carried out by NHA Inspection Wing.

== See also ==
- Fairy Meadows, Nanga Parbat
