= Kushalgarh, Pakistan =

Village in Pakistan

Coordinates: 33°29′N 71°54′E

Kushalgarh is a village in the Kohat District of Khyber Pakhtunkhwa. It is the point at which the Indus River was bridged to permit the extension of the railway from Rawalpindi to the Miranzai and Kurram valleys.
