= Chuha Gujar Bridge =

Chuha Gujar Bridge چوہا گجر پل
- Coordinates: 33°59′46″N 71°37′33″E
- Carries: Historic roadway (now chiefly pedestrian)
- Crosses: Bara River
- Locale: Peshawar, Khyber Pakhtunkhwa, Pakistan
- Begins: Chuha Gujar (south bank)
- Ends: Bara Road (north bank)
- Other name(s): Bara Bridge, Speen Bridge, Sethian Bridge
- Named for: Nearby village of Chuha Gujar
- Owner: Government of Khyber Pakhtunkhwa
- Heritage status: Provincial heritage site

Characteristics
- Design: Arch bridge
- Material: Brick
- Total length: 88 m (289 ft)
- Width: 10 m (33 ft)
- Traversable?: yes
- No. of spans: 13 arches
- Piers in water: 26

History
- Designer: Abdul Lateef Khan
- Constructed by: Lashkar Khan (provincial governor)
- Built: c. 1629

Location
- Interactive map of Chuha Gujar Bridge

Chuha Gujar Bridge, also known as the Bara Bridge, Speen Bridge, and sometimes Sethian Bridge, is a historic bridge over Bara River located southeast of Peshawar in Khyber Pakhtunkhwa, Pakistan. It lies approximately 30 minutes from the city center and is flanked by ancient, deep-rooted Bodhi trees. It is the oldest surviving bridge in the province.

== History ==
Scholarly opinion on the commissioning of the bridge is divided. Some sources attribute its construction to Sher Shah Suri of the Suri dynasty (r. 1540–1545). However, archaeological evidence more strongly supports a Mughal origin. A marble slab recovered during the excavation of a mosque in Qissakhwani Bazaar bears Persian inscriptions naming the Mughal emperor Shah Jahan (r. 1627–1658), the provincial governor Lashkar Khan, and the project’s engineer, Abdul Lateef Khan, which suggests that the bridge was constructed in 1629.

The bridge is also referred to as the Sethian Bridge, a name derived from oral traditions that attribute its construction to Haji Karim Bakhsh Sethi, a merchant of the Mughal period.

== Architecture ==
The bridge was constructed in the Mughal architectural tradition using small, traditional Waziri red bricks. It rests on 26 pillars of varying dimensions, incorporating twelve spillways designed to regulate water flow during periods of high discharge. Above these spillways are thirteen arched supports, each crowned with a decorative dome. The bridge measures approximately 88 meters in length and 10 meters in width.
