= Rathoa Haryam Bridge =

Pakistani construction

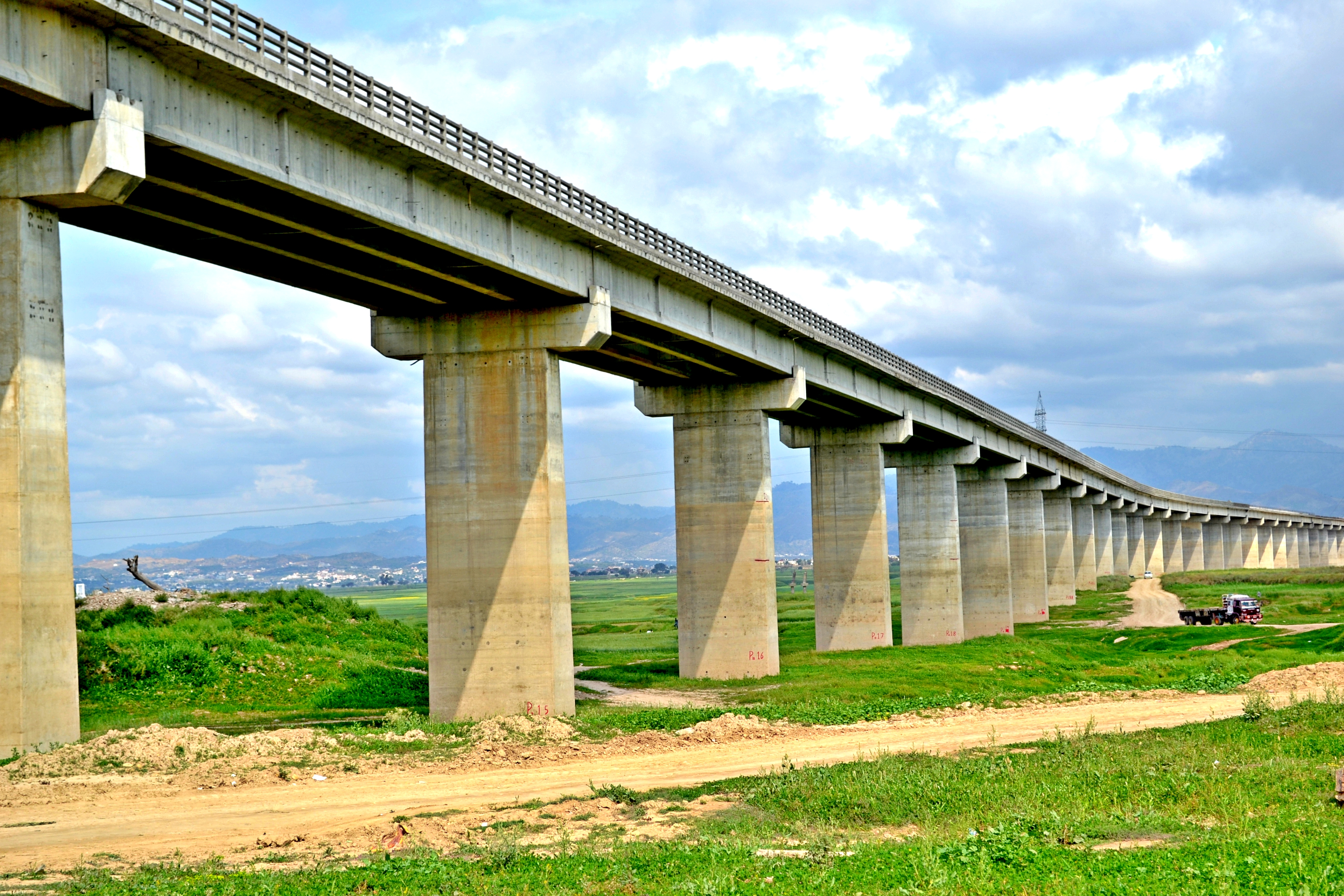
- Coordinates: 33°09′37″N 73°48′21″E

History
- Construction start: 2006
- Construction end: 2026

Location
- Interactive map of Rathoa Haryam Bridge

Rathoa Haryam Bridge, Mirpur, also known as the Islamgarh Bridge, is a three kilometre long bridge, located in the Mirpur District of Azad Jammu Kashmir in Pakistan. The bridge spans over the Mangla Lake and provide fastest route to Southern Kotli District from Mirpur, Punjab, and Islamabad.

The bridge was named after two villages on its opposite sides. The bridge was included in a comprehensive three-party agreement among the Government of Pakistan, Government of Azad Kashmir, and the Water & Power Development Authority.
