= Chiniot Bridge =

Road Bridge in Punjab, Pakistan

Chiniot Bridge چنیوٹ پل
- Coordinates: 31°45′10″N 72°56′53″E
- Carries: Pedestrians, automobiles and trucks
- Crosses: Chenab River
- Locale: Chenab Nagar, Chiniot-Sargodha road
- Owner: Government

Characteristics
- Design: Beam
- Material: Concrete
- Total length: 520 meters
- Width: 17.8 meters
- No. of spans: 13 of 40 m each

History
- Constructed by: National Highway Authority
- Construction end: June 2001
- Construction cost: Rs. 450 Million

Chiniot Bridge (also known as Rabwah Bridge) (Urdu: چنیوٹ پل) is a concrete bridge on the Chenab River located in Chiniot in Punjab, Pakistan. It is about 520 meters in length and 17.8 meters wide. The two-lane bridge has 26 spans of 40 meters each. It is located at 4.6 km from Khatm-e-Nabuwat Chowk and 3.3 km from Chiniot Railway Station.
