= Chowk Kumharanwala Level II Flyover =

Coordinates: 30°12′35.7798″N 71°30′54.36″E

Chowk Kumharanwala Level II Flyover also called Jinnah Chowk Flyover is located in Multan city of Pakistan, at an intersection itself called Chowk Kumharanwala, Jinnah Chowk or Qadaffi Chowk. The foundation stone was laid by former prime minister Yousaf Raza Gillani on 26 April 2011. It was constructed as part of Inner Ring Road Multan project.

== Records ==
This flyover has record of being first ever grade separated level II flyover in Punjab province of Pakistan.

== Cost and Dimensions ==
The 325-metre-long and 7.3-metre-wide Jinnah Chowk level one fly over was completed in 13 months at a cost of 500 million rupees.

== Roads Complexes ==
It is a complex intersection with six roads namely

- Khanewal Road
- National Highway 5
- New Multan Main Boulevard
- Piran Ghaib Road
- University Road
- Masoom Shah Road

== Grade Separation ==
This flyover is grade separated and it is first level II flyover of Punjab province of Pakistan.

- There is complex of roads on ground level connecting all road to the New Multan Main Boulevard.
- Level I flyover connect Khanewal Road to the National Highway 5 towards Lahore.
- Level II flyover is one way and connect Khanewal Road with New Multan Main Boulevard. An extra one way slip entry ramp from newly created University Road also joins with the level II flyover.

== See also ==
- Yousuf Raza Gillani Flyover
- List of flyovers in Lahore
