= Muslim conquests in the Indian subcontinent =

The Muslim conquests in the Indian subcontinent mainly took place between the 13th and the 18th centuries, as a part of the Indo-Muslim period. Earlier Muslim conquests in the Indian subcontinent include the invasions which started in the northwestern South Asia (modern-day Pakistan), especially the Umayyad campaigns in India during the 8th century. Mahmud of Ghazni, sultan of the Ghaznavid Empire, invaded vast areas of Punjab and Gujarat during the 11th century. After the capture of Lahore and the end of the Ghaznavids, the Ghurid ruler Muhammad of Ghor laid the foundation of Muslim rule in India in 1192. In 1202, Muhammad Bakhtiyar Khalji led the Muslim conquest of Bengal, marking the easternmost expansion of Islam at the time.

The Ghurid Empire soon evolved into the Delhi Sultanate in 1206, ruled by Qutb ud-Din Aibak, the founder of the Mamluk dynasty. With the Delhi Sultanate established, Islam spread across most parts of the Indian subcontinent. In the 14th century, the Khalji dynasty under Alauddin Khalji, extended Muslim rule southwards to Gujarat, Rajasthan, and the Deccan. The successor Tughlaq dynasty temporarily expanded its territorial reach to Tamil Nadu. The disintegration of the Delhi Sultanate, capped by Timur's invasion in 1398, caused several Muslim sultanates and dynasties to emerge across the Indian subcontinent, such as the Gujarat Sultanate, Malwa Sultanate, Bahmani Sultanate, Jaunpur Sultanate, Madurai Sultanate, and the Bengal Sultanate. Some of these, however, were followed by Hindu native powers and states, such as the Vijayanagara Empire and several Rajput states.

The Delhi Sultanate was replaced by the Mughal Empire in 1526, one of the three gunpowder empires. Emperor Akbar gradually enlarged the Mughal Empire to include a large portion of the subcontinent. Under Akbar, who stressed the importance of religious tolerance and winning over the goodwill of the subjects, a multicultural empire came into being with various non-Muslim subjects being actively integrated into the Mughal Empire's bureaucracy and military machinery. The economic and territorial zenith of the Mughals was reached at the end of the 17th century, when under the reign of emperor Aurangzeb the empire witnessed the full establishment of Islamic Shari'a through the Fatawa al-Alamgir.

The Mughals went into a sudden decline immediately after achieving their peak following the death of Aurangzeb in 1707, due to a lack of competent and effective rulers among Aurangzeb's successors. The Afsharid ruler Nader Shah's invasion in 1739 was an unexpected attack which demonstrated the weakness of the Mughal Empire. This provided opportunities for various regional states such as Rajput states, Mysore Sultanate, Sind State, Nawabs of Bengal, Maratha Empire, Sikh Empire, and Nizams of Hyderabad to declare their independence and exercise control over large regions of the Indian subcontinent, further accelerating the geopolitical disintegration of the Indian subcontinent.

The Muslim conquests in Indian subcontinent came to a halt after the Battle of Plassey (1757), the Battle of Buxar (1764), Anglo-Mysore wars (1767–1799), Anglo-Maratha wars (1775–1818), Anglo-Sind War (1843) and Anglo-Sikh war (1845–6; 1848–49) as the British East India Company seized control of much of the Indian subcontinent up till 1857. Throughout the 18th century, European powers continued to exert a large amount of political influence over the Indian subcontinent, and by the end of the 19th century most of the Indian subcontinent came under European colonial domination, most notably the British Raj until 1947.

== First phase (8th to 10th centuries) ==
=== Early Muslim presence ===
The first ever recorded incursion by Arabs in India occurred around 636/7 AD, during the Rashidun Caliphate, long before any Arab army reached the frontier of India by land. Uthman ibn Abi al-As, the governor of Bahrain and Oman, had dispatched naval expeditions against the Sasanian coast, and further east to the borders of India, as confirmed by the contemporary Armenian historian, Sebeos. Uthman, on his own initiative and without the sanction of Caliph Umar, according to the history of al-Baladhuri, had also launched two naval raids against ports of the Indian subcontinent, the first of these raids targeted Thane (a small town near Mumbai) and Bharuch (a city in Gujarat). The second raid targeted Debal (a town near Karachi). The assault on Thane, the first recorded Arab raid on India, was commanded by Uthman's brother al-Hakam, who also led the raid on Bharuch. The following raid on Debal was commanded by another brother, al-Mughira. The raids were probably launched in c. 636 according to al-Baladhuri. These expeditions were not sanctioned by Caliph Umar; Uthman escaped punishment only because there were no casualties.

The raids on Thane and Bharuch may have been successful as the Arabs had lost no men during these raids, but al-Baladhuri does not specifically state these raids as successful, so some scholars are of the opinion that the Arabs raids may have been failures. and forced the Arabs to retreat. The raid on Debal may have occurred in 643 AD and faced success, but it is unlikely as Umar was still the Caliph and Uthman was unlikely to disobey his directive on sea raids, and the source reporting this is deemed unreliable.

The motivation for these expeditions may have been to seek plunder or to attack pirates to safeguard Arabian trade in the Arabian Sea, not to start the conquest of India. Shortly after the Muslim conquest of Persia, the connection between the Sindh and Islam was established by the initial Muslim missions during the Rashidun Caliphate.

=== Rashidun Caliphate and the frontier kingdoms ===
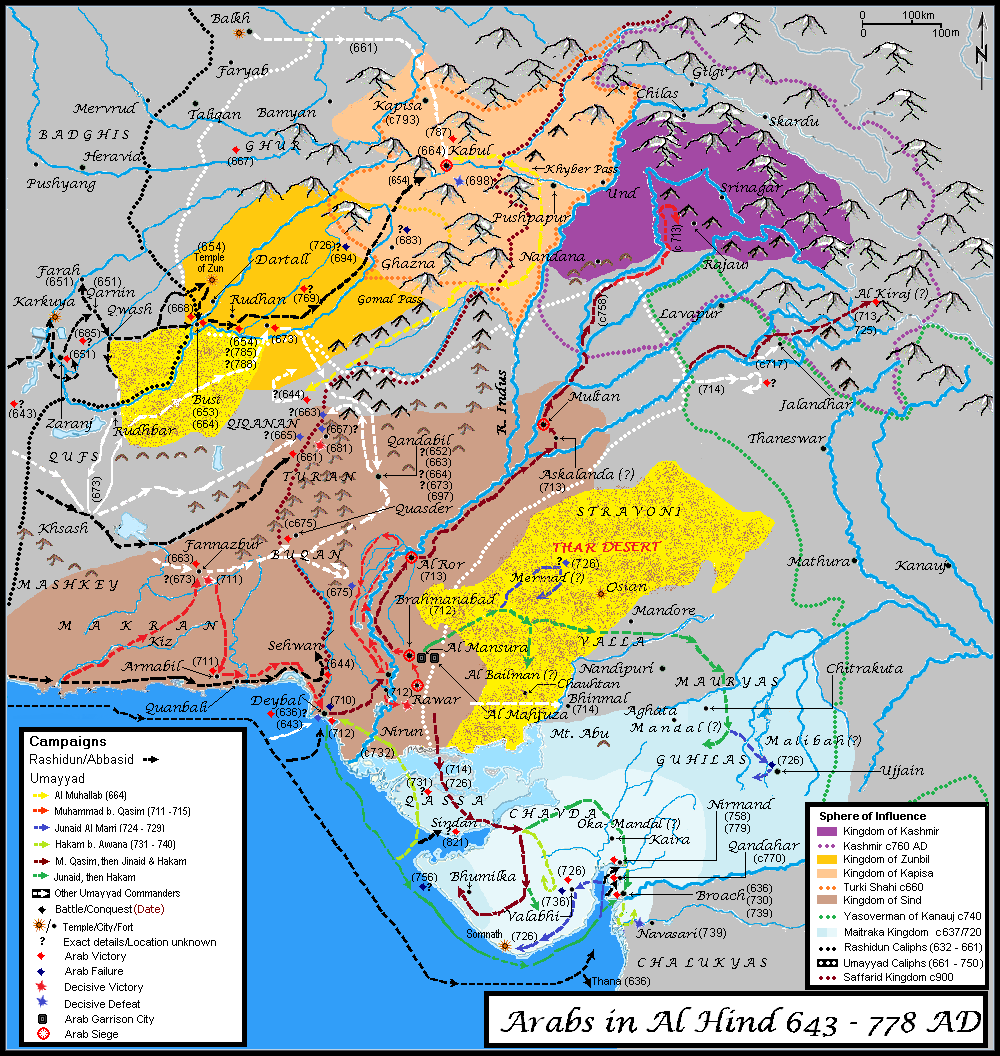
Arab campaigns on the Indian Subcontinent. Desert areas (Registan Desert and Thar Desert) Zunbils Turk Shahis Kingdom of Kashmir Kingdom of Sindh (c. 632– 711 AD) then, Caliphal province of Sind (712-854 AD) Maitraka Kingdom (c.475–c.776 AD)

The kingdoms of Kapisa-Gandhara in modern-day Afghanistan, Zabulistan, and Sindh (which then held Makran) in modern-day Pakistan, all of which were culturally part of Indian subcontinent since ancient times, were known as "The Frontier of Al Hind" to the Arabs. Makran had been conquered by Chach of Aror in 631 AD, but ten years later, it was described as "under the government of Persia" by Xuanzang, who had visited the region in 641.

The first clash between a ruler of an Indian kingdom and the Arabs took place in 643, when Arab forces defeated Rutbil, the King of Zabulistan in Sistan. Arabs led by Suhail b. Abdi later defeated a Sindhi army in the Battle of Rasil in 644 on the Indian Ocean coast, then reached the Indus River. Caliph Umar ibn Al-Khattab denied Suhail permission to carry on across the river. Al-Hakim ibn Jabalah al-Abdi, who attacked Makran in the year 649 AD, was an early partisan of Ali ibn Abu Talib.

Abd Allah ibn Amir led the invasion of Khurasan in 650 AD, and his general Rabi b. Ziyad Al Harithi attacked Sistan and took Zaranj and surrounding areas in 651 while Ahnaf ibn Qais conquered the Hepthalites of Herat and advanced up to Balkh by 653. Arab conquests now bordered the Kingdoms of Kapisa, Zabul and Sindh in modern-day Afghanistan and Pakistan. The Arabs levied annual tributes on the newly captured areas, and after leaving 4,000 men garrisons at Merv and Zaranj, retired to Iraq instead of pushing on against the frontier of India. Caliph Uthman b. Affan sanctioned an attack against Makran in 652, and sent a recon mission to Sindh in 653. The mission described Makran as inhospitable, and Caliph Uthman, probably assuming the country beyond the Indus was much worse, forbade any further incursions into Indian subcontinent. During the caliphate of Ali, many Hindus of Sindh had come under the influence of Shi'ism and some even participated in the Battle of Camel and died fighting for Ali.

Under the Umayyads (661–750 AD), many Shias sought asylum in the region of Sindh, to live in relative peace in the remote area. Ziyad Hindi was one of those refugees.

=== Umayyad expansion in Al Hind ===
Mu'awiya I established the Umayyad rule over the Arabs after the First Fitna in 661 AD, and resumed expansion of the Muslim empire. Al-Baladuri wrote that, "In the year 44 H. (664 A.D.), and in the days of the Khalif Mu'awiya, Muhallib son of Abu Safra made war upon the same frontier, and advanced as far as Banna [Bannu] and Alahwar [Lahore], which lie between Multan and Kabul."

After 663-665 CE, the Arabs launched an invasion against Kapisa, Zabul and what is now Pakistani Balochistan. Abdur Rahman b. Samurra besieged Kabul in 663 AD, while Haris b Marrah advanced against Kalat after marching through Fannazabur and Quandabil and moving through the Bolan Pass. King Chach of Sindh sent an army against the Arabs, the Arabs were trapped when the enemy blocked the mountain passes, Haris was killed and his army was annihilated. Al-Muhallab ibn Abi Sufra took a detachment through the Khyber pass towards Multan in southern Punjab in modern-day Pakistan in 664 AD, then pushed south into Kikan, and may have also raided Quandabil. Turki Shah and Zunbil expelled Arabs from their respective kingdoms by 670, and Zunbil began assisting in organizing resistance against the Arabs in Makran.

This was the beginning of a prolonged struggle between the rulers of Kabul and Zabul in modern-day and Pakistan against successive Arab governors of Sistan, Khurasan and Makran. The Kabul Shahi kings and their Zunbil kinsmen successfully blocked access to the Khyber Pass and Gomal Pass routes into India from 653 to 870 AD, while modern Balochistan, Pakistan, comprising the areas of Kikan or Qiqanan, Nukan, Turan, Buqan, Qufs, Mashkey and Makran, would face several Arab expeditions between 661 and 711 AD. The Arabs launched several raids against these frontier lands, but repeated rebellions in Sistan and Khurasan between 653 and 691 AD diverted much of their military resources in order to subdue these breakaway provinces and away from expansion into Al Hind. Muslim control of these areas ebbed and flowed repeatedly as a result until 870 AD. Arab troops disliked being stationed in Makran. Fierce resistance stalled Arab progress repeatedly in the "frontier zone". and the Arabs had to focus on tribute extraction instead of systematic conquest as a result.

=== Battles in Makran and Zabulistan ===
Arabs launched several campaigns in eastern Balochistan between 661 and 681 AD. Four Arab commanders were killed during these campaigns, however, Sinan b. Salma managed to conquer parts of Makran including the Chagai area, and established a permanent base of operations by 673 AD. Rashid b. Amr, the next governor of Makran, subdued Mashkey in 672 CE. Munzir b. Jarood Al Abadi managed to garrison Kikan and conquer Buqan by 681 CE, while Ibn Harri Al Bahili conducted several campaigns to secure the Arab hold on Kikan, Makran and Buqan by 683 AD. Zunbil saw off Arab campaigns in 668, 672 and 673 by paying tribute. Although Arabs occupied the areas south of Helmand in 673 permanently, Zunbil defeated Yazid b. Salm's army in 681 AD at Junzah, and Arabs had to pay 500,000 dirhams as ransom to get free their prisoners.

=== Al Hajjaj and the East ===
Al-Hajjaj ibn Yusuf, who had played a crucial role during the Second Fitna for the Umayyad cause, was appointed the governor of Iraq in 694 AD. Hajjaj received governorship of Khurasan and Sistan in 697 and he sponsored Muslim expansions in Makran, Sistan, Transoxiana and Sindh.

=== Campaigns in Makran and Zabul ===
The Arab's hold on Makran weakened when Arab rebels seized the province, and Hajjaj had to send expeditions under three governors between 694 and 707 AD before Makran was partially recovered by 694 AD. Al Hajjaj also fought against Zunbil in 698 and 700 AD. The 20,000 strong army led by Ubaidullah ibn Abu Bakra was trapped by the armies of Zunbil and Turki Shah near Kabul in 698 AD, and lost 15,000 men to thirst and hunger, earning this force the title of the "Doomed Army". Ibn al-Ash'ath next led 20,000 troops each from Kufa and Basra (dubbed the "Peacock Army" due to the splendor of their equipment and the participation of numerous members of Arab nobility). His methodical 699 AD campaign made gains, but he was contemptuously rebuked by Hajjaj at every step. When Ibn al-Ash'ath paused his operation to consolidate, Hajjaj insulted him and ordered an immediate advance. This unreasonable demand led to mutiny. The mutiny was put down by 704 AD, and Al-Hajjaj granted a 7-year truce to Zunbil.

=== Umayyad expansion in Sind and Multan ===
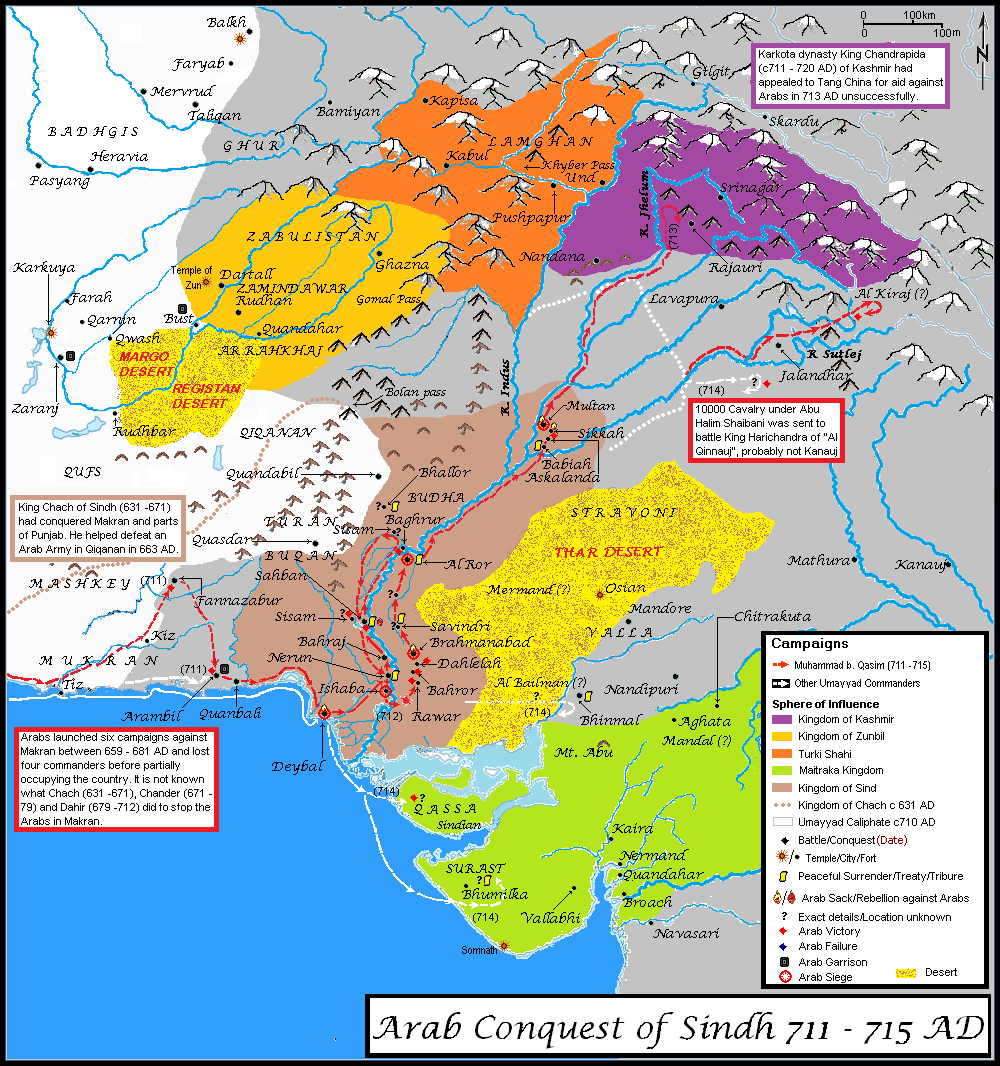
Muhammad ibn Qasim's Campaigns in Sindh. Desert areas (Registan Desert and Thar Desert) Zunbils Turk Shahis Kingdom of Kashmir Kingdom of Sindh (c. 632–712 AD) Maitraka Kingdom (c. 475–c. 776 AD) Umayyad Caliphate (c. 710 AD)

Med pirates, known as Bawarij, operated from their bases at Kutch, Debal and Kathiawar and during one of their raids had kidnapped Muslim women travelling from Sri Lanka to Arabia, thus providing the casus belli against Raja Dahir. Raja Dahir had previously refused to return Arab rebels from Sindh and furthermore, he now expressed his inability to punish the pirates. Hajjaj sent two expeditions to Sindh, both of which were defeated. Al Hajjaj next equipped an army built around 6,000 Syrian cavalry and detachments of mawali from Iraq, six thousand camel riders, and a baggage train of 3,000 camels under his Nephew Muhammad bin Qasim to Sindh. His artillery of five catapults were sent to Debal by sea ("manjaniks").

=== Conquest of Sindh ===
Muhammad bin Qasim departed from Shiraz in 710 AD, the army marched along the coast to Tiaz (modern day Tis, Iran) in Makran, where the army of Makran joined him, and the combined force moved to the Kech valley. Muhammad subdued the restive towns of Fannazbur and Armabil, finally completing the conquest of Makran. Then the army met up with the reinforcements and catapults sent by sea near Debal and took Debal through assault. From Debal, the Arabs moved towards north along the Indus, clearing the region up to Budha. Some towns like Nerun and Sadusan (Sehwan) surrendered peacefully. Muhammad bin Qasim moved back to Nerun to resupply and receive reinforcements sent by Hajjaj. The Arabs crossed the Indus further South and defeated the army of Dahir, who was killed. Brahmanabad, then Alor (Aror) and finally Multan, were captured alongside other in-between towns with only light Muslim casualties. Arabs marched up to the foothills of Kashmir along the Jhelum in 713 AD, and stormed the Al-Kiraj (possibly the Kangra valley). Muhammad was deposed after the death of Caliph Walid in 715. Jai Singh, son of Dahir captured Brahmanabad and Arab rule was restricted to the Western shore of the Indus. Sindh was briefly lost to the caliph when the rebel Yazid b. Muhallab took over Sindh in 720.

=== Last Umayyad campaigns in Al Hind ===
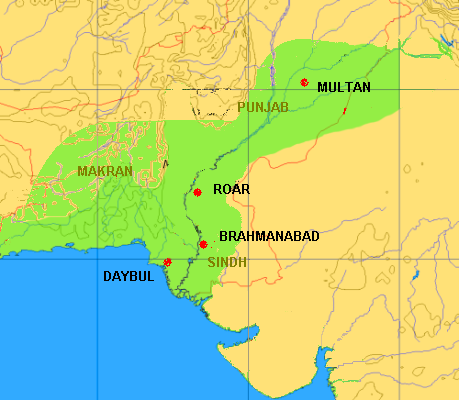
Early Arab conquest of what is now Pakistan by Muhammad bin Qasim for Umayyad caliphate rule c. 711 AD.

Junaid b. Abd Al Rahman Al Marri became the governor of Sindh in 723 AD. He conquered Debal, defeated and killed Jai Singh, secured Sindh and Southern Punjab and then stormed Al Kiraj (Kangra valley) in 724 AD. Junaid next attacked a number of Hindu kingdoms in what is now Rajasthan, Gujarat and Madhya Pradesh aiming at permanent conquest, but the chronology and area of operation of the campaigns during 725–743 is difficult to follow because accurate, complete information is lacking. The Arabs moved east from Sindh in several detachments and probably attacked from both the land and the sea, occupying Mirmad (Marumada, in Jaisalmer), Al-Mandal (perhaps Okhamandal in Gujarat) or Marwar, and raiding Dahnaj, not identified, al-Baylaman (Bhilmal) and Jurz (Gurjara country — north Gujarat and southern Rajasthan), and attacking Barwas (Broach). Gurjara king Siluka repelled Arabs from "Stravani and Valla", probably the area North of Jaisalmer and Jodhpur, and the invasion of Malwa but were ultimately defeated by Bappa Rawal and Nagabhata I in 725 AD near Ujjain. Arabs lost control over the newly conquered territories and part of Sindh due to Arab tribal infighting and Arab soldiers deserting the newly conquered territory in 731 AD.

Al Hakam b. Awana Al Kalbi founded the garrison city of Al Mahfuza on the eastern side of a lake near Brahmanabad. Hakam next attempted to reclaim the conquests of Junaid in Al Hind. Arab records merely state that he was successful, Indian records at Navasari details that Arab forces defeated "Kacchella, Saindhava, Saurashtra, Cavotaka, Maurya and Gurjara" kings. The city of Mansura, Sindh was founded near Al Mahfuza by Amr b. Muhammad. Al Hakam next invaded the Deccan in 739 with the intention of permanent conquest, but was decisively defeated at Navsari by the viceroy Avanijanashraya Pulakeshin of the Chalukya Empire serving Vikramaditya II. Arab rule was restricted to the west of Thar desert.

=== Last period of Abbasid Caliphate control ===
When the Abbasid Revolution overthrew the Umayyads in 750 AD after the Third Fitna, Sindh became independent and was captured by Musa b. K'ab al Tamimi in 752 AD. Zunbil had defeated the Arabs in 728 AD, and saw off two Abbasid invasions in 769 and 785. Abbasids attacked Kabul several times and collected tribute between 787 and 815 AD and extracted tribute after each campaign. Abbasid's Governor of Sindh, Hisham (in office 768–773) raided Kashmir, recaptured parts of Punjab from Karkota control, and launched naval raids against ports of Gujarat. These raids like other Abbasid Naval raids launched in 776 and 779 AD, gained no territory. Arabs occupied Sindian (Southern Kutch) in 810, only to lose it in 841. Civil war erupted in Sindh in 842 AD, and the Habbari dynasty occupied Mansurah, and by 871, five independent principalities had emerged, with the Banu Habbari clan controlling in Mansurah, Banu Munabbih occupying Multan, Banu Madan ruling in Makran, and Makshey and Turan falling to other rulers, all outside direct Caliphate control. Isma'ili missionaries found a receptive audience among both the Sunni and non-Muslim populations in Multan, which became a center of the Ismaili sect of Islam. The Saffarid dynasty of Zaranj occupied Kabul and the kingdom of Zunbil permanently in 871 AD. A new chapter of Muslim conquests began when the Samanid Empire took over the Saffarid Kingdom and Sabuktigin seized Ghazni.

=== Later Muslim invasions ===
After the Decline of the Caliphate, Muslim incursions resumed under the later Turkic and Central Asian dynasties like the Saffarid dynasty and the Samanid dynasty with more local capitals. They supplanted the Abbasid Caliphate and expanded their domains both northwards and eastwards. Continuous raids from these empires in the north-west of India led to the loss of stability in the Indian kingdoms.

After three centuries of unremitting effort, Arab dominion in India was limited to two states of Multan and Mansurah

== Second phase (11th to 12th centuries) ==
=== Ghaznavid Sultanate ===
Under Sabuktigin, the Ghaznavid Empire found itself in conflict with the Kabul Shahi Raja Jayapala in the east. When Sabuktigin died and his son Mahmud ascended the throne in 998 AD, Ghazni was engaged in the North with the Qarakhanids when the Shahi Raja renewed hostilities in east once again.

In the early 11th century, Mahmud of Ghazni launched seventeen expeditions into Indian subcontinent. In 1001, Sultan Mahmud of Ghazni defeated Jayapala of Gandhara in the Battle of Peshawar and marched further towards the west of Peshawar (in modern Pakistan) and, in 1005, made it the center for his forces.

In 1030, al-Biruni reported on the devastation caused during the conquest of Gandhara and much of northwest India by Mahmud of Ghazni following his defeat of Jayapala in the Battle of Peshawar in 1001:

Now in the following times no Muslim conqueror passed beyond the frontier of Kabul and the river Sindh until the days of the Turks, when they seized the power in Ghazna under the Sâmânî dynasty, and the supreme power fell to the lot of Nasir-addaula Sabuktagin. This prince chose the holy war as his calling, and therefore called himself al-Ghazi ("the warrior/invader"). In the interest of his successors, he constructed, to weaken the Indian frontier, those roads on which afterwards his son Yamin-addaula Mahmud marched into India during a period of thirty years and more. Mahmud utterly ruined the prosperity of the country, and performed there wonderful exploits, by which the Hindus became like atoms of dust scattered in all directions, and like a tale of old in the mouth of the people. Their scattered remains cherish, of course, the most inveterate aversion towards all Muslims. This is the reason, too, why Hindu sciences have retired far away from those parts of the country conquered by us, and have fled to places which our hand cannot yet reach, to Kashmir, Benares, and other places. And there the antagonism between them and all foreigners receives more and more nourishment both from political and religious sources.

During the closing years of the tenth and the early years of the succeeding century of our era, Mahmud the first Sultan and Musalman of the Turk dynasty of kings who ruled at Ghazni, made a succession of inroads twelve or fourteen in number, into Gandhar – the present Peshwar valley – in the course of his proselytizing invasions of Hindustan.

Fire and sword, havoc and destruction, marked his course everywhere. Gandhar which was styled the Garden of the North was left at his death a weird and desolate waste. Its rich fields and fruitful gardens, together with the canal which watered them (the course of which is still partially traceable in the western part of the plain), had all disappeared. Its numerous stone built cities, monasteries, and topes with their valuable and revered monuments and sculptures, were sacked, fired, razed to the ground, and utterly destroyed as habitations.

The Ghaznavid conquests were initially directed against the Isma'ili dynasty of Multan, who were engaged in an ongoing struggle with the provinces of the Abbasid Caliphate in conjunction with their compatriots of the Fatimid Caliphate in North Africa and the Middle East; Mahmud apparently hoped to curry the favor of the Abbasids in this fashion. However, once this aim was accomplished, he moved onto the looting of Indian temples and monasteries. By 1027, Mahmud had captured parts of North India and obtained formal recognition of Ghazni's sovereignty from the Abbasid Caliph, al-Qadir Billah.

Ghaznavid's rule in Northwestern India (modern Afghanistan and Pakistan) lasted over for 175 years, from 1010 to 1187. It was during this period that Lahore assumed considerable importance, apart from being the second capital, and later the only capital of the Ghaznavid Empire.

At the end of his reign, Mahmud's empire extended from Kurdistan in the west to Samarkand in the Northeast, and from the Caspian Sea to the Punjab in the west. Although his raids carried his forces across Northern and Western India, only Punjab came under his permanent rule while Kashmir, the Doab, Rajasthan, and Gujarat remained nominal under the control of the local Indian dynasties. In 1030, Mahmud fell gravely ill and died at age 59. As with the invaders of three centuries ago, Mahmud's armies reached temples in Varanasi, Mathura, Ujjain, Maheshwar, Jwalamukhi, Somnath and Dwarka.

=== Ghurid Empire ===
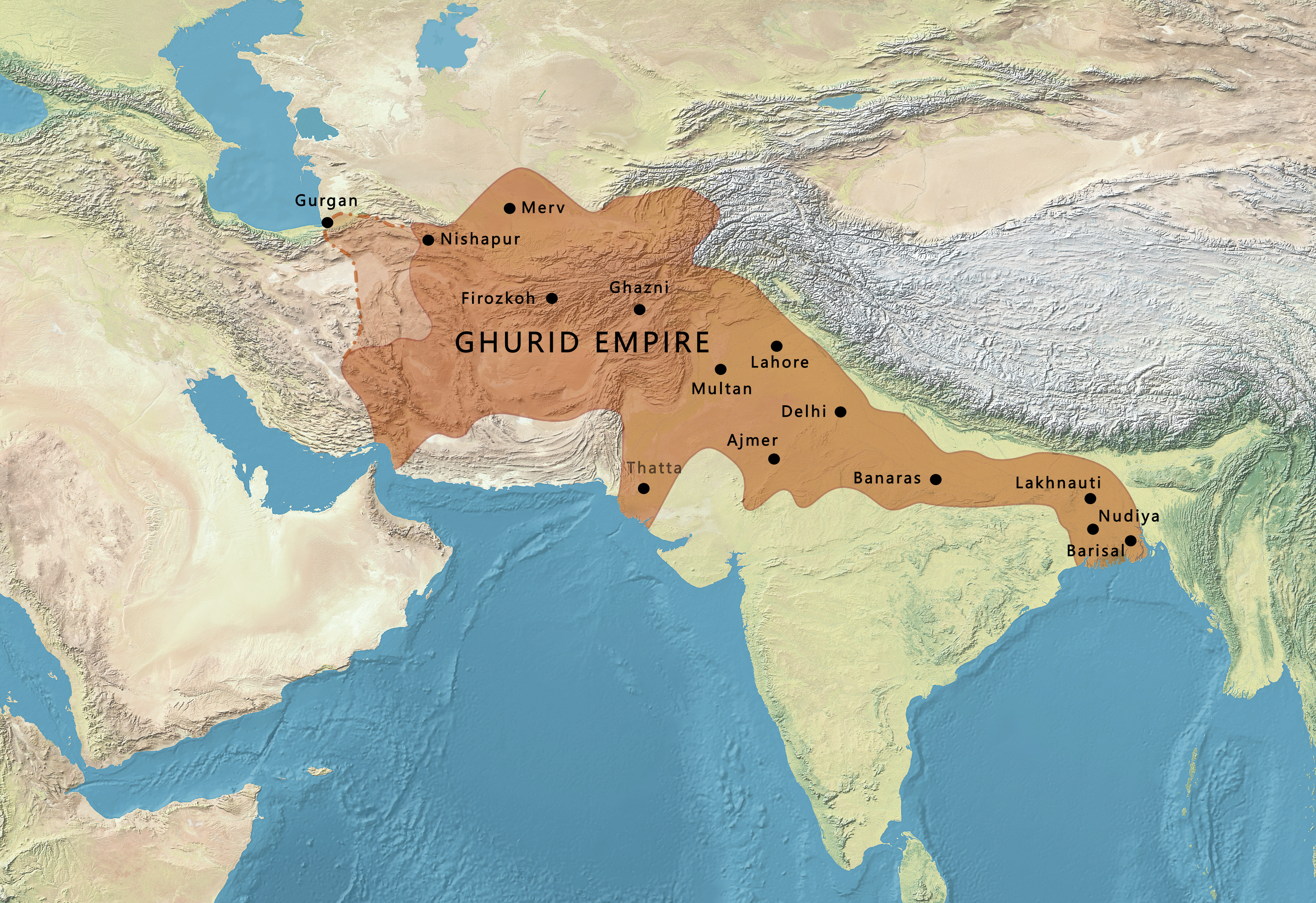
Map of the Ghurid dynasty at its greatest extent in the early 13th century under Ghiyath al-Din Muhammad and Muhammad of Ghor

Before 1160, the Ghaznavid Empire covered an area running from central Iran east to the Punjab, with capitals at Ghazni in present-day Afghanistan, and at Lahore in present-day Pakistan. Muhammad of Ghor, also known as Mu'izz al-Din, was a conqueror from the region of Ghor in modern Afghanistan. In 1173, he was crowned in Ghazni. In 1186, he conquered Lahore, ending the Ghaznavid Empire and bringing the last of Ghaznavid territory under his control. His early campaigns in the Indian subcontinent were against the Qarmatians of Multan.

In 1191, Muhammad of Ghor invaded the territory of Prithviraj III of Ajmer, who ruled his territory from Delhi to Ajmer in present-day Rajasthan, but was defeated at the First Battle of Tarain. The following year, Muhammad of Ghor assembled 120,000 men and once again invaded India. His army met Prithviraj's army again at Tarain, and this time Muhammad of Ghor won; Prithviraj was executed, and Muhammad of Ghor advanced onto Delhi. Within a year, he controlled north-western Rajasthan and the northern Ganges-Yamuna Doab. After these victories in India, and his establishment of Delhi as the capital of his Indian provinces, Multan was also incorporated as a major part of his empire. He then returned east to Ghazni to deal with the threat on his eastern frontiers from the Turks of the Khwarizmian Empire, while his armies continued to advance through Northern India, raiding as far as Bengal.

Muhammad of Ghor returned to Lahore after 1200. In 1206, he had to travel to Lahore to crush a revolt. On his way back to Ghazni, his caravan rested at Damik near Sohawa (which is near the city of Jhelum in the modern-day Punjab province of Pakistan). He was assassinated on 15 March 1206, while offering his evening prayers, by the assassins from the Isma'ili Muslim sect.

== Third phase (13th to 16th centuries) ==
=== Delhi Sultanate ===
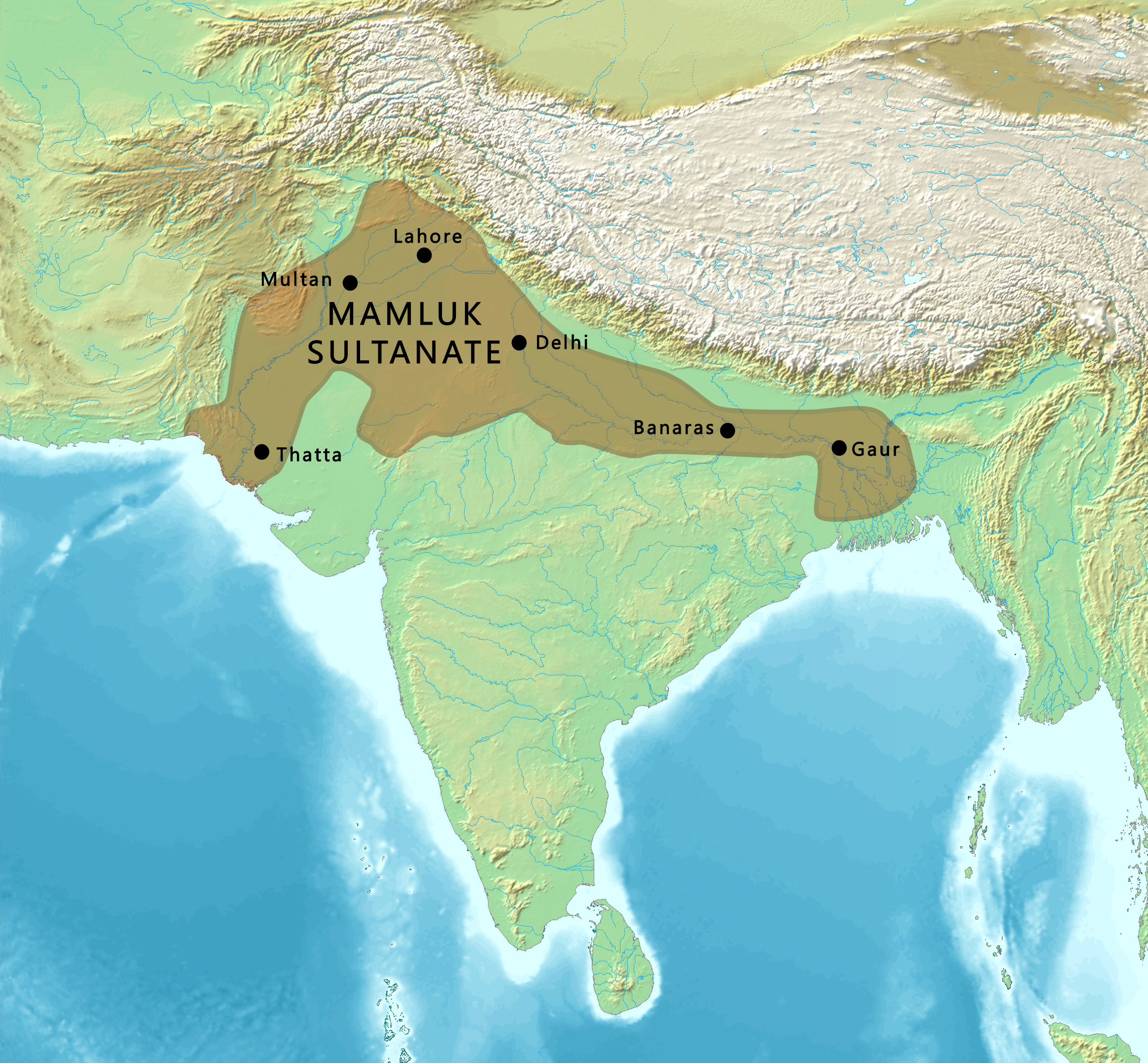
Mamluk Dynasty

Muhammad Ghoris successors established the first dynasty of the Delhi Sultanate, while the Mamluk Dynasty in 1211 (however, the Delhi Sultanate is traditionally held to have been founded in 1206) seized the reins of the empire. Mamluk means "slave" and referred to the Turkic slave soldiers who became rulers. The territory under control of the Muslim rulers in Delhi expanded rapidly.

Several Turko-Afghan dynasties ruled from Delhi: the Mamluk (1206–1290), the Khalji (1290–1320), the Tughlaq (1320–1414), the Sayyid (1414–51), and the Lodhi (1451–1526). By the mid-century, Bengal and much of central India was under the Delhi Sultanate.

==== Tughlaq invasions ====
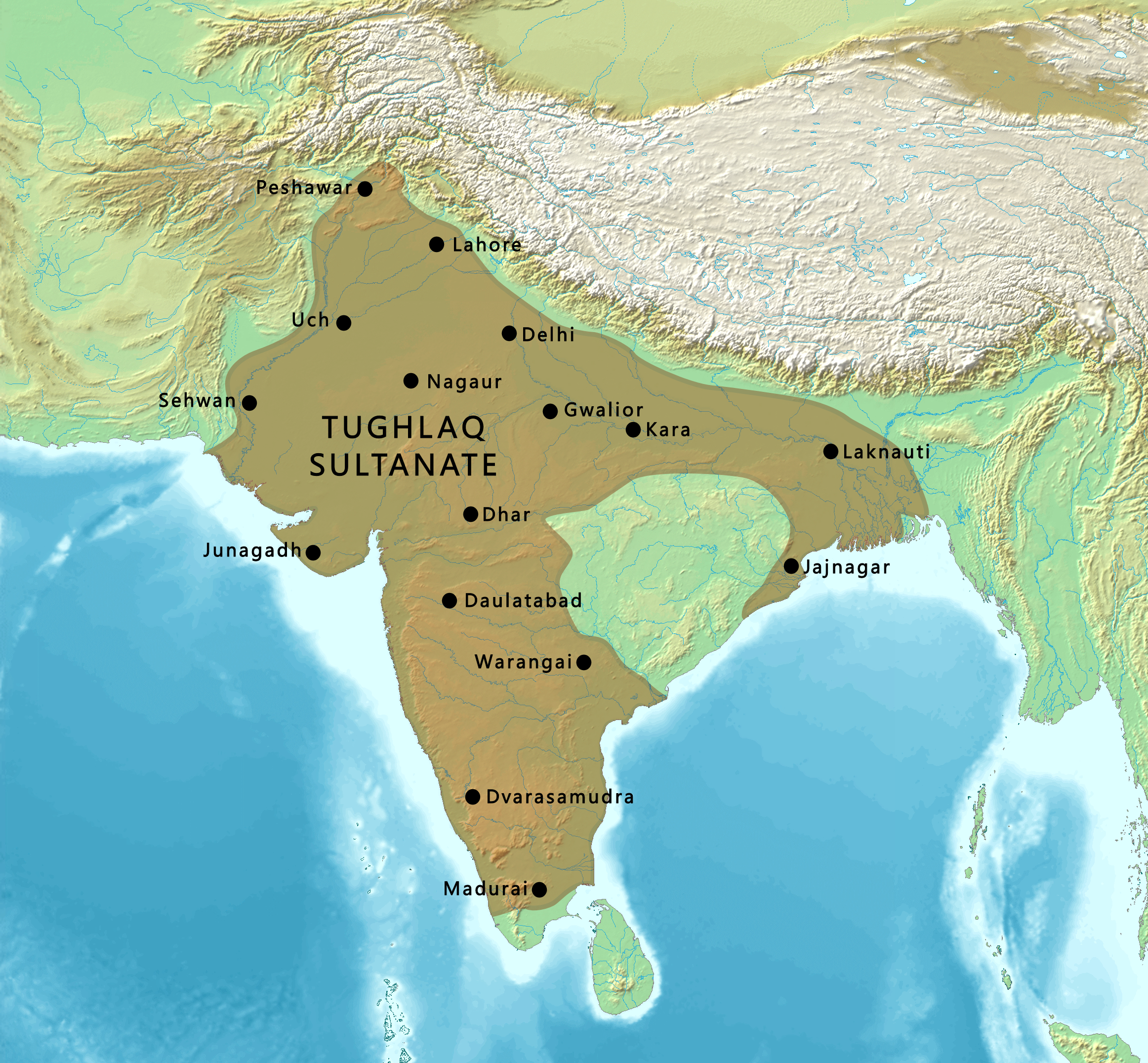
Delhi Sultanate reached its zenith under the Tughlaq dynasty.

The Tughlaqs conquered Delhi with the support of the Khokhar tribes who formed the vanguard of the army. The Tughlaqs claimed to be "bound to all Indians by ties of blood and relation". Under the first ruler of the dynasty, Ghiyath al-Din Tughlaq, the Tughlaq court wrote a war ballad known as the Vaar in the Punjabi language, describing the introduction of Ghazi Malik's rise to the throne. This was the earliest known Vaar in Punjabi poetry. The Tughlaqs attacked and plundered Malwa, Gujarat, Mahratta, Tilang, Kampila, Dhur-samundar, Mabar, Lakhnauti, Chittagong, Sonargaon and Tirhut. The Tughlaqs chose Daulatabad in southern India as the second administrative capital of the Delhi Sultanate. The Delhi Sultanate forced migration of the Muslim population of Delhi, including his royal family, the nobles, Syeds, Sheikhs and 'Ulema to settle in Daulatabad. The purpose of transferring the entire Muslim elite to Daulatabad was to act as propagandists who would adapt Islamic religious symbolism to the rhetoric of empire, and so the Sufis could by persuasion bring many of the inhabitants of the Deccan to become Muslim. These elite colonists from the capital of Delhi were Urdu-speakers, who carried the Urdu language to the Deccan.

During the time of Delhi Sultanate, the Vijayanagara Empire resisted attempts of Delhi Sultanate to establish dominion in the Southern India, serving as a barrier against invasion by the Muslims.

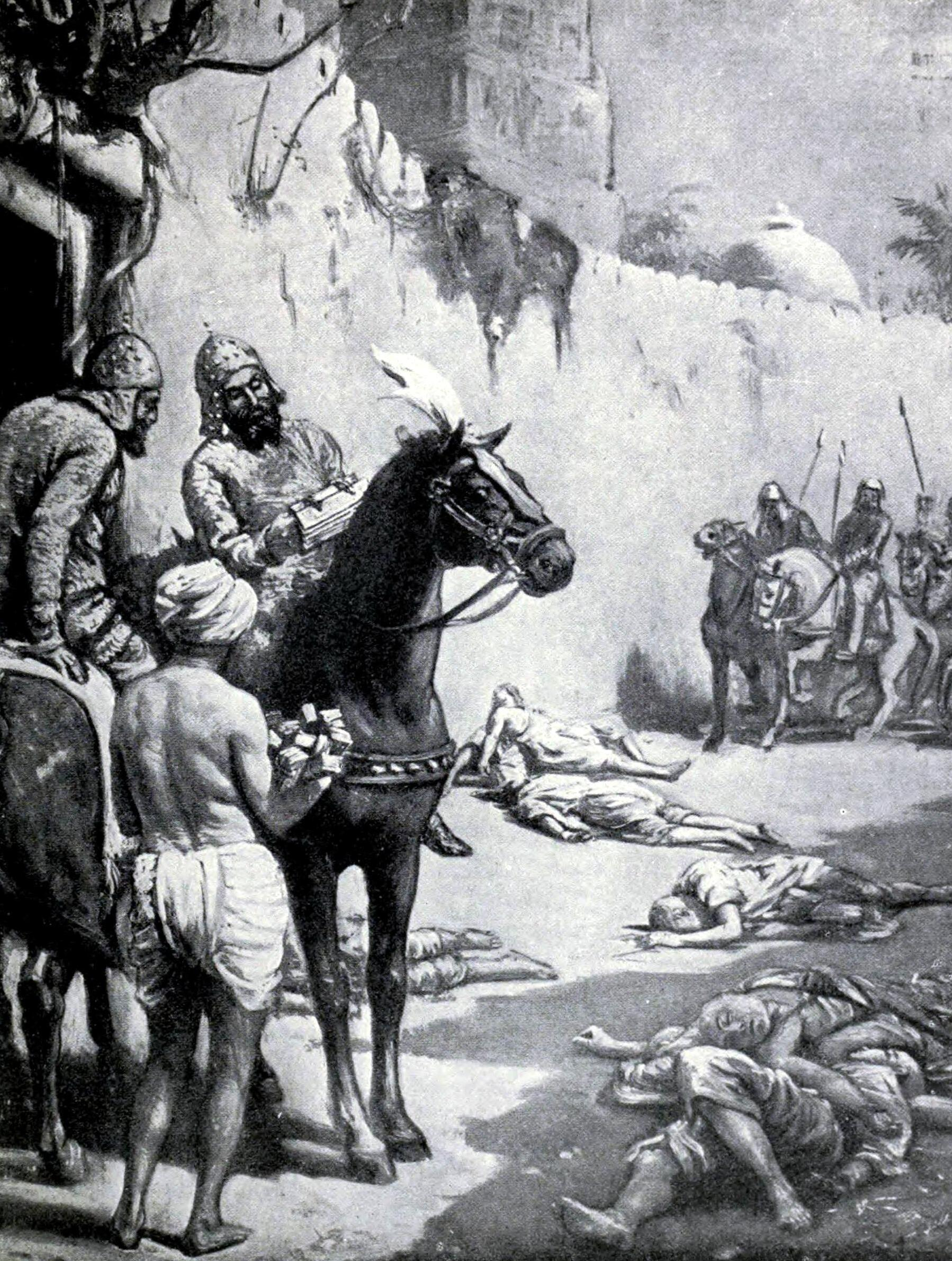
Bakhtiyar Khilji's massacre of Buddhist monks in Bihar, India. Khilji destroyed the Nalanda and Vikramshila universities during his raids across North Indian plains, massacring many Buddhist and Brahmin scholars.

The Sultans of Delhi enjoyed cordial, if superficial, relations with Muslim rulers in the Near East but owed them no allegiance. They based their laws on the Quran and the Shari'a and permitted non-Muslim subjects to practice their own religions if they paid the jizya (poll tax). They ruled from urban centers, while military camps and trading posts provided the nuclei for towns that sprang up in the countryside.

Perhaps the most significant contribution of the Sultanate was its temporary success in insulating the subcontinent from the potential devastation of the Mongol invasion from Central Asia in the 13th century, which nonetheless led to the capture of Afghanistan and western Pakistan by the Mongols under the Ilkhanate. Under the Sultanate, "Indo-Muslim" fusion left lasting monuments in architecture, music, literature, and religion. In addition it is surmised that the language of Urdu (literally meaning "horde" or "camp" in various Turkic dialects) was born during the Delhi Sultanate period as a result of the mingling of Sanskritic Hindi and the Persian, Turkish, Arabic favoured by the Muslim invaders of India.

The Sultanate suffered significantly from the sacking of Delhi in 1398 by Timur, but revived briefly under the Lodi dynasty. This was the final dynasty of the Sultanate before it was conquered by Zahiruddin Babur in 1526, who subsequently founded the Mughal dynasty that ruled from the 16th to the 18th centuries.

==== Timur ====
Tīmūr bin Taraghay Barlas, known in the West as Tamerlane or "Timur the lame", was a 14th-century warlord of Turco-Mongol descent. He had conquered much of western and central Asia, and founded the Timurid Empire (1370–1507) in Central Asia which survived until 1857 as the Mughal dynasty of India.

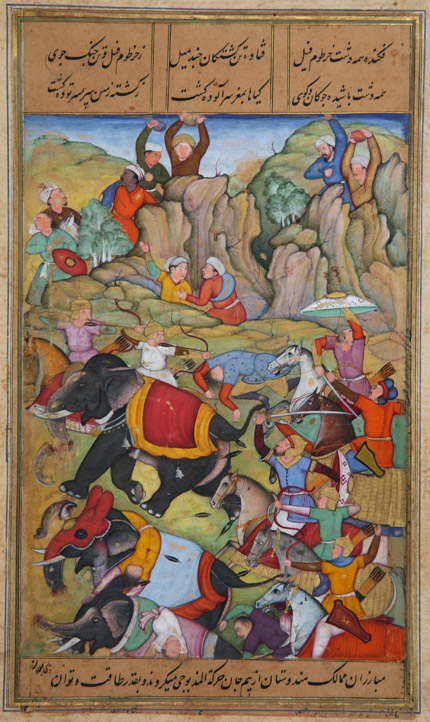
Timur defeats the Sultan of Delhi, Nasir-u Din Mehmud, in the winter of 1397–1398

Informed about civil war in South Asia, Timur began a trek starting in 1398 to invade the reigning Sultan Mahmud Shah II of the Tughlaq dynasty in the north Indian city of Delhi. His campaign was politically pretexted that the Muslim Delhi Sultanate was too tolerant toward its "Hindu" subjects, but that could not mask the real reason being to amass the wealth of the Delhi Sultanate.

Timur's invasion did not go unopposed, however, and he did meet some resistance during his march to Delhi, most notably by the Khokhar chief Jasrat, however he was able to continue his relentless approach to Delhi, arriving in 1398 to combat the armies of Sultan Mehmud, already weakened by an internal battle for ascension within the royal family.

The Sultan's army was easily defeated on 17 December 1398. Timur entered Delhi and the city was sacked, destroyed, and left in ruins. Before the battle for Delhi, Timur executed more than 100,000 "Hindu" captives. Timur's purported autobiography, the Tuzk-i Timuri ("Memoirs of Temur") is a later fabrication.

Historian Irfan Habib wrote that in the 14th century, the word "Hindu" (people of "Al-Hind", "Hind" being "India") included "both Hindus and Muslims" in religious connotations.

When Timur entered Delhi after defeating Mahmud Toghloq's forces, he granted an amnesty in return for protection money (mâl-e amâni). But on the fourth day he ordered that all the people of the city be enslaved; and so they were. Thus reports Yahya, who here inserts a pious prayer in Arabic for the victims' consolation ("To God we return, and everything happens by His will"). Yazdi, on the other hand, does not have any sympathy to waste on these wretches. He records that Timur had granted protection to the people of Delhi on 18 December 1398, and the collectors had begun collecting the protection money. But large groups of Timur's soldiers began to enter the city and, like birds of prey, attacked its citizens. The "pagan Hindus" (Henduân-e gabr) having had the temerity to begin immolating their women and themselves, the three cities of Delhi were put to sack by Timur's soldiers. "Faithless Hindus", he adds, had gathered in the Congregation Mosque of Old Delhi and Timur's officers put them ruthlessly to slaughter there on 29 December. Clearly, Yazdi's "Hindus" included Muslims as well.

Timur left Delhi in approximately January 1399. In April he had returned to his own capital beyond the Oxus (Amu Darya). Immense quantities of spoils were taken from India. According to Ruy Gonzáles de Clavijo, 90 captured elephants were employed merely to carry precious stones looted from his conquest, which was used to erect a mosque at Samarkand – what historians today believe is the enormous Bibi-Khanym Mosque. Ironically, the mosque was constructed too quickly and suffered from disrepair within a few decades of its construction.

=== Regional sultanates ===
The Makran Sultanate was one of the first kingdom to transition from an emirate to a sultanate in the 13th century. Regional sultanates such as Kashmir (1320), Madurai (1335), Bahmani (1347), Sindh (1351), Bengal (1352), Khandesh (1382), Jaunpur (1394), Gujarat (1394), Malwa (1401), Mewat (1427), and Multan (1445) expanded at the expense of the Delhi Sultanate. Gaining conversions to Islam was easier under regional Sultanates.

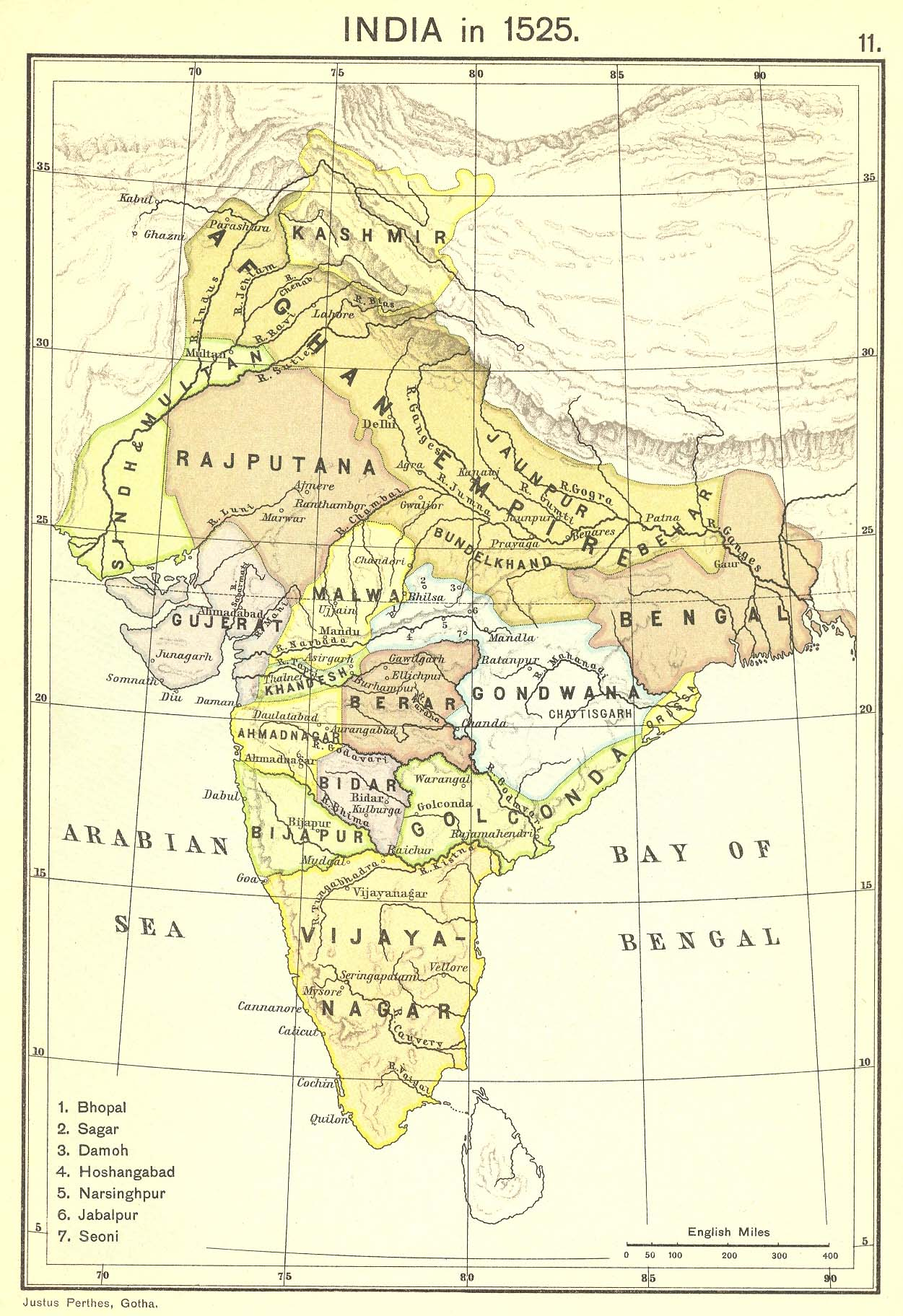
Indian subcontinent in 1525

The founders of these sultanates were all of different origins; Rinchan was a Buddhist prince from Ladakh, Hasan Kaithali was a Sayyid native of Kaithal, Zafar Khan, a Turco-Afghan adventurer, was born in Ghazni, Jam Unar was a local warlord from the Samma tribe, Ilyas Khan emerged as a Turco-Persian officer from Sistan, Malik Ahmad was from Khurasan and claimed Arab descent, Malik Sarwar was a Siddi eunuch, Zafar Khan belonged to a Kalal family of vintners, Dilawar Khan was a Turco-Afghan officer from Ghor, Sambhar Pal was a Hindu prince from the Khanzada Rajput dynasty, while Rai Sahra was the chief of the Langah clan.

=== Deccan sultanates ===
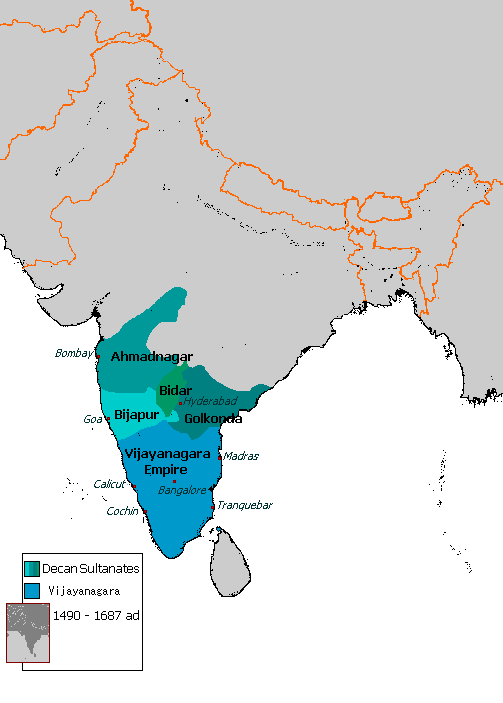
Map of five Deccan Sultanates before Battle of Talikota.

The term Deccan sultanates is used for five Muslim dynasties that ruled several late medieval Indian kingdoms, namely Bijapur Sultanate, Golkonda Sultanate, Ahmadnagar Sultanate, Bidar Sultanate, and Berar Sultanate in South India. The Deccan Sultanates ruled the Deccan Plateau between the Krishna River and the Vindhya Range. These sultanates became independent during the separation of the Bahmani Sultanate, another Muslim empire.

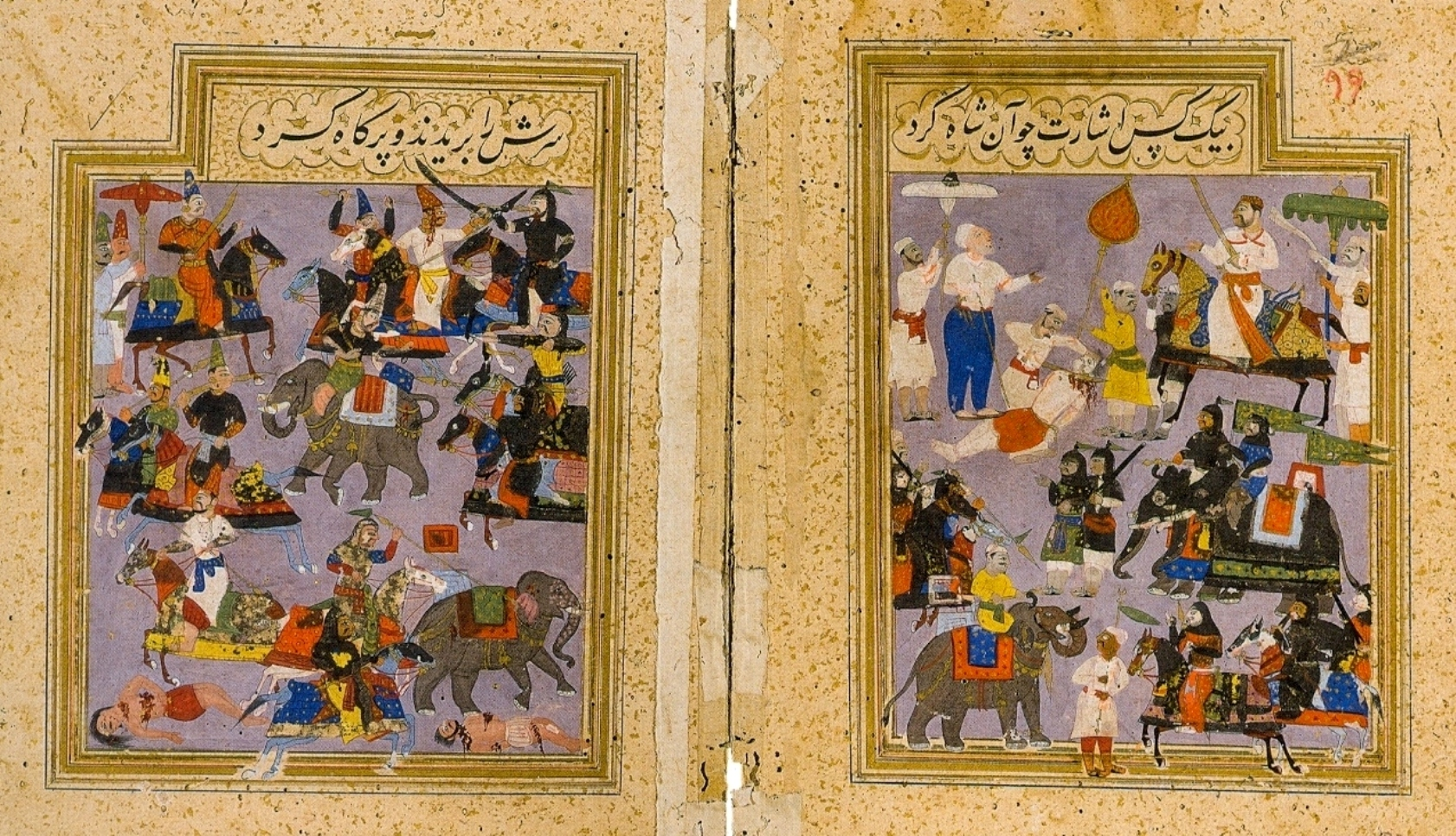
Victory of Deccan Sultanates in Battle of Talikota.

The ruling families of all these five sultanates were of diverse origin; the Qutb Shahi dynasty of Golconda was of Turkmen origin, the Barid Shahi dynasty of Bidar being founded by a Turkic slave, the Adil Shahi dynasty of Bijapur was founded by a Georgian slave while Nizam Shahi dynasty of Ahmadnagar and Imad Shahi dynasty of Berar Sultanate were of Marathi and Kannada lineages, respectively.

== Fourth phase (16th to 18th centuries) ==
=== Mughal Empire ===
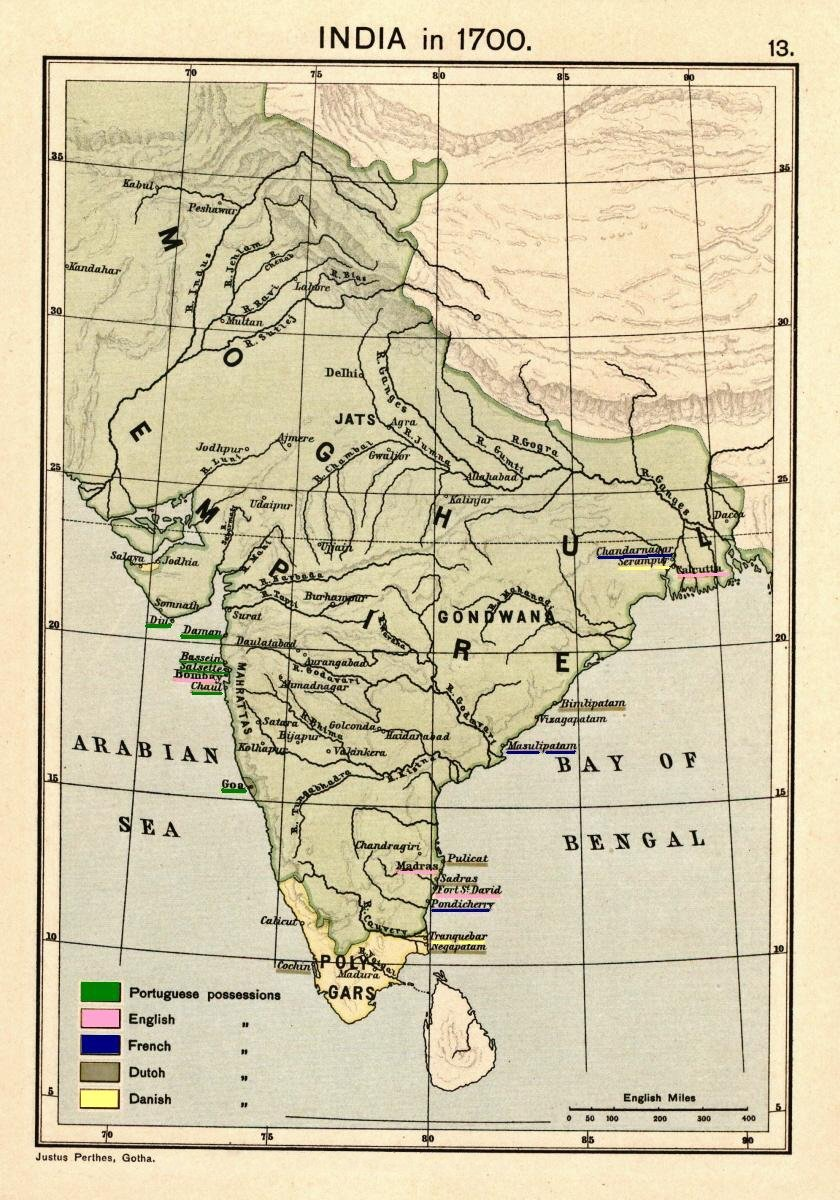
The Mughal Empire in 1700

India in the early 16th century presented a fragmented picture of rulers who lacked concern for their subjects and failed to create a common body of laws or institutions. Outside developments also played a role in shaping events. The circumnavigation of Africa by the Portuguese explorer Vasco da Gama in 1498 allowed Europeans to challenge Muslim control of the trading routes between Europe and Asia. In Central Asia and Afghanistan, shifts in power pushed Babur of the Timurid dynasty (in present-day Uzbekistan) southward, first to Kabul and then to the heart of Indian subcontinent. The dynasty he founded endured for more than two centuries.

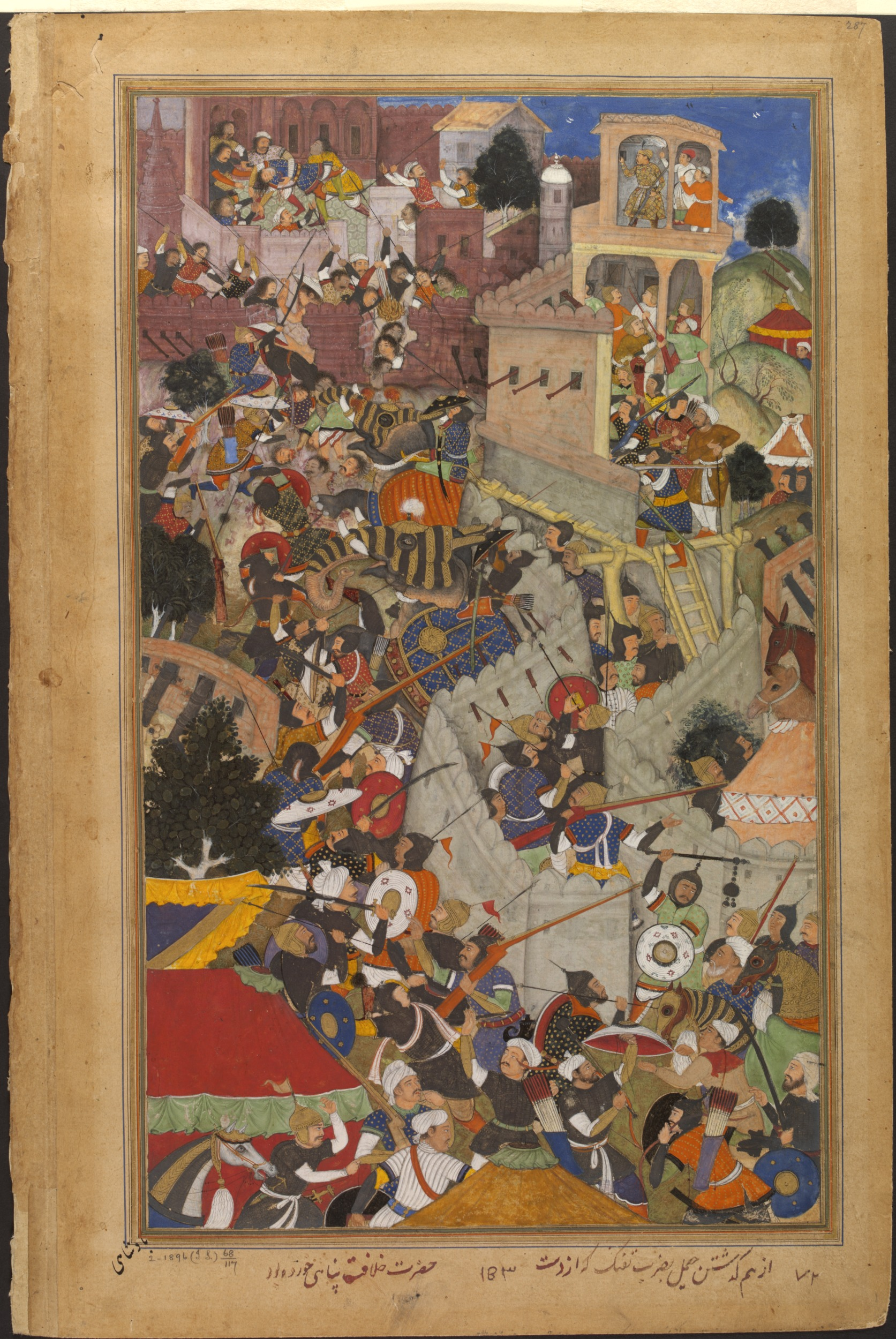
The Mughal Emperor Akbar shoots the Rajput warrior Jaimal during the Siege of Chittorgarh in 1567.

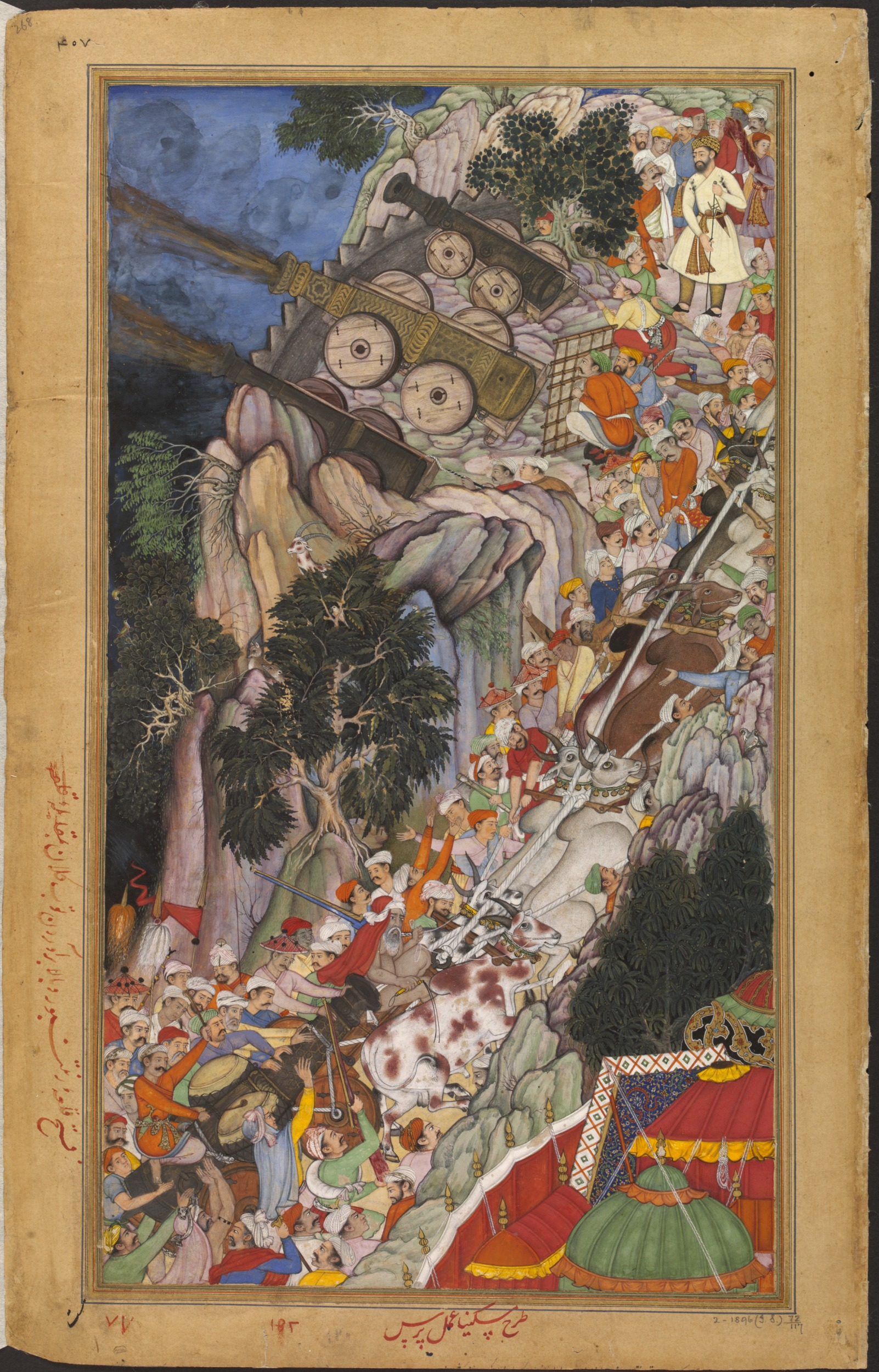
Bullocks dragging siege-guns up hill during Mughal Emperor Akbar's attack on Ranthambhor Fort in 1568.

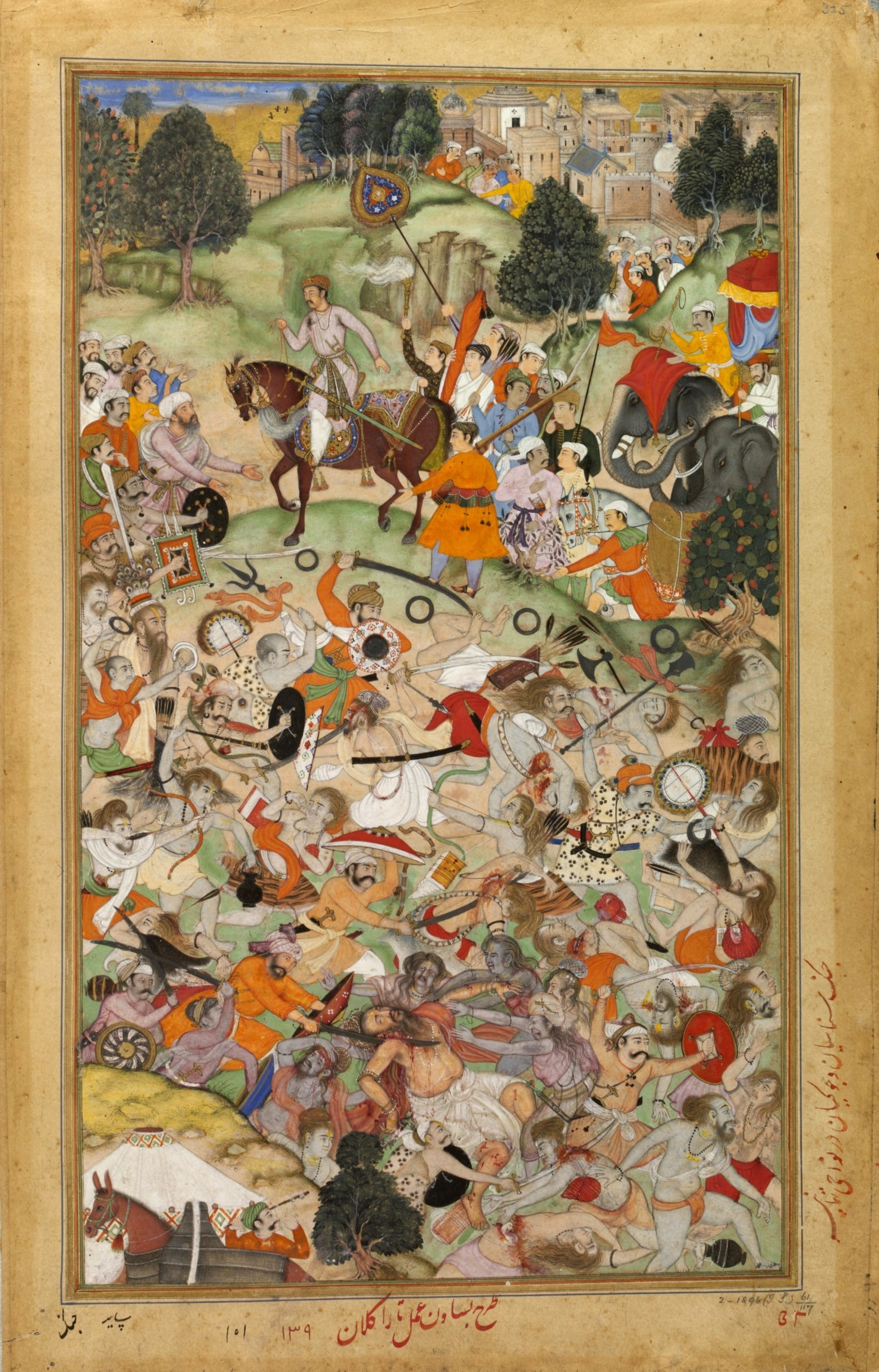
The Mughal Army commanded by Akbar attack members of the Sannyasa during the Battle of Thanesar.

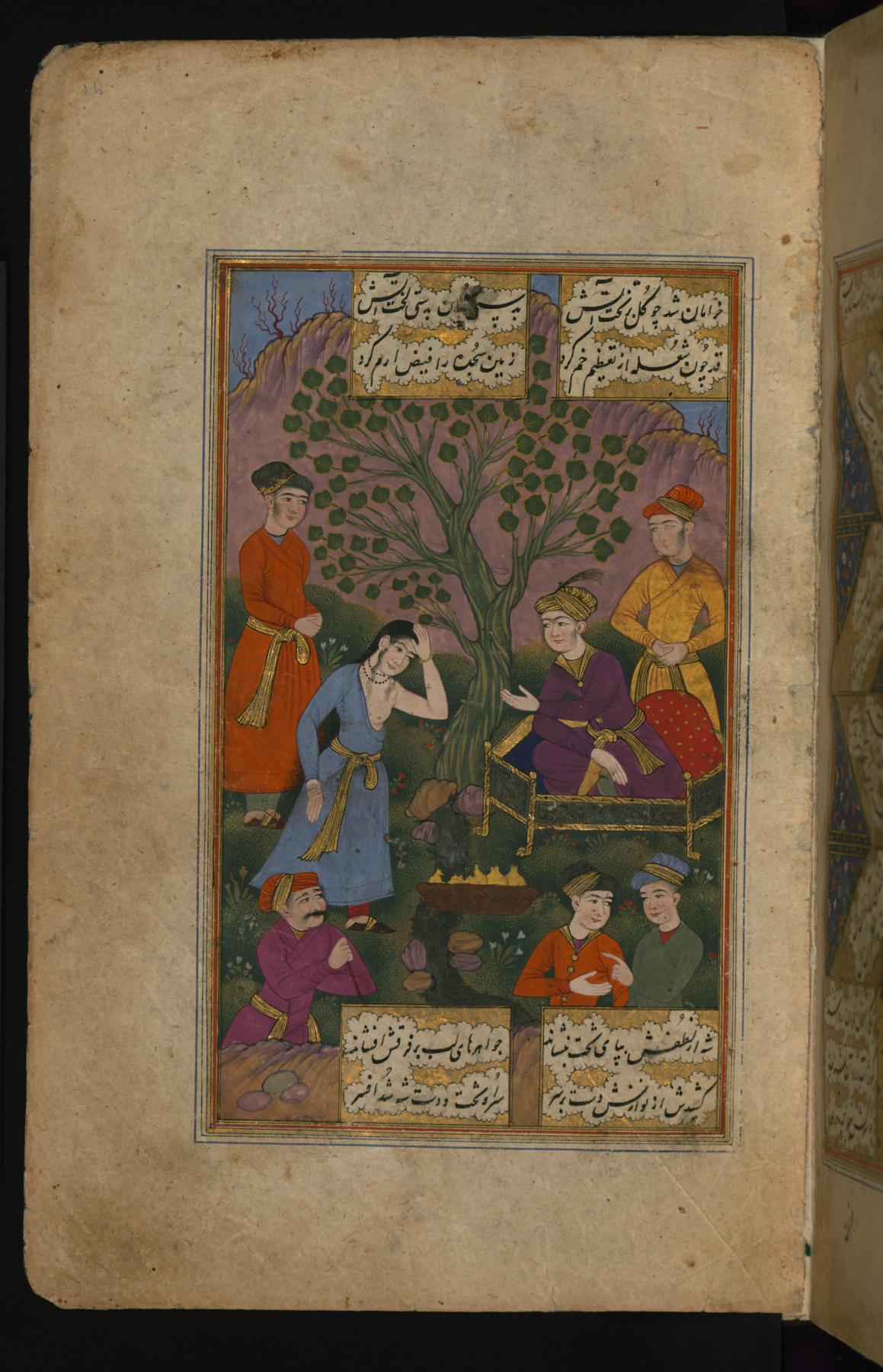
Mughal Emperor Akbar attempts to dissuade the young Hindu girl from committing sati

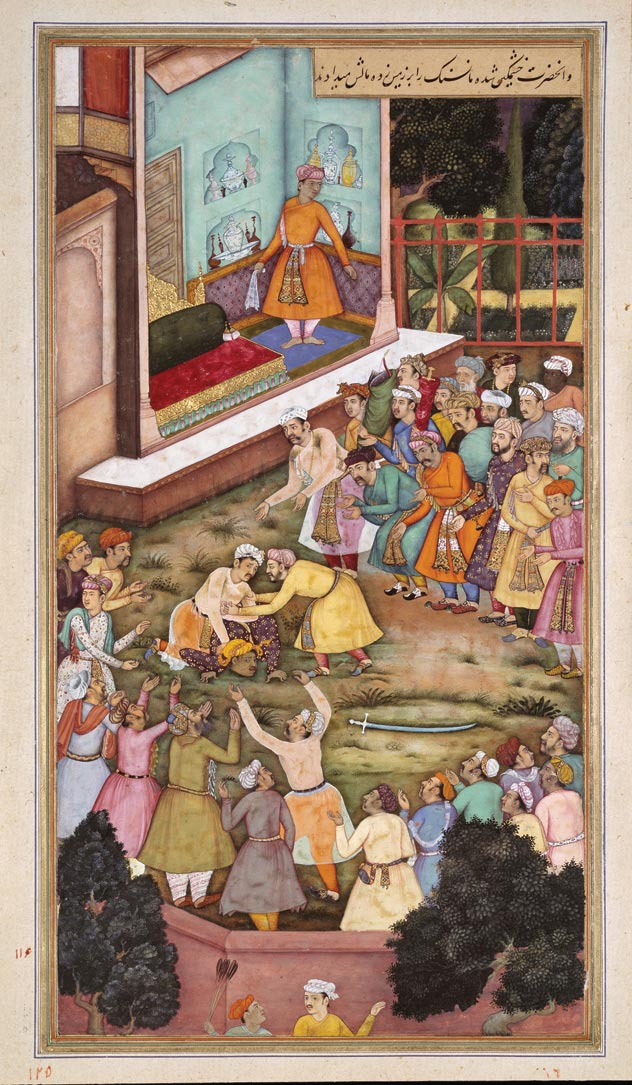
The Mughal Emperor Akbar fights Pehlwani with his Hindu general Raja Man Singh I of Jaipur.

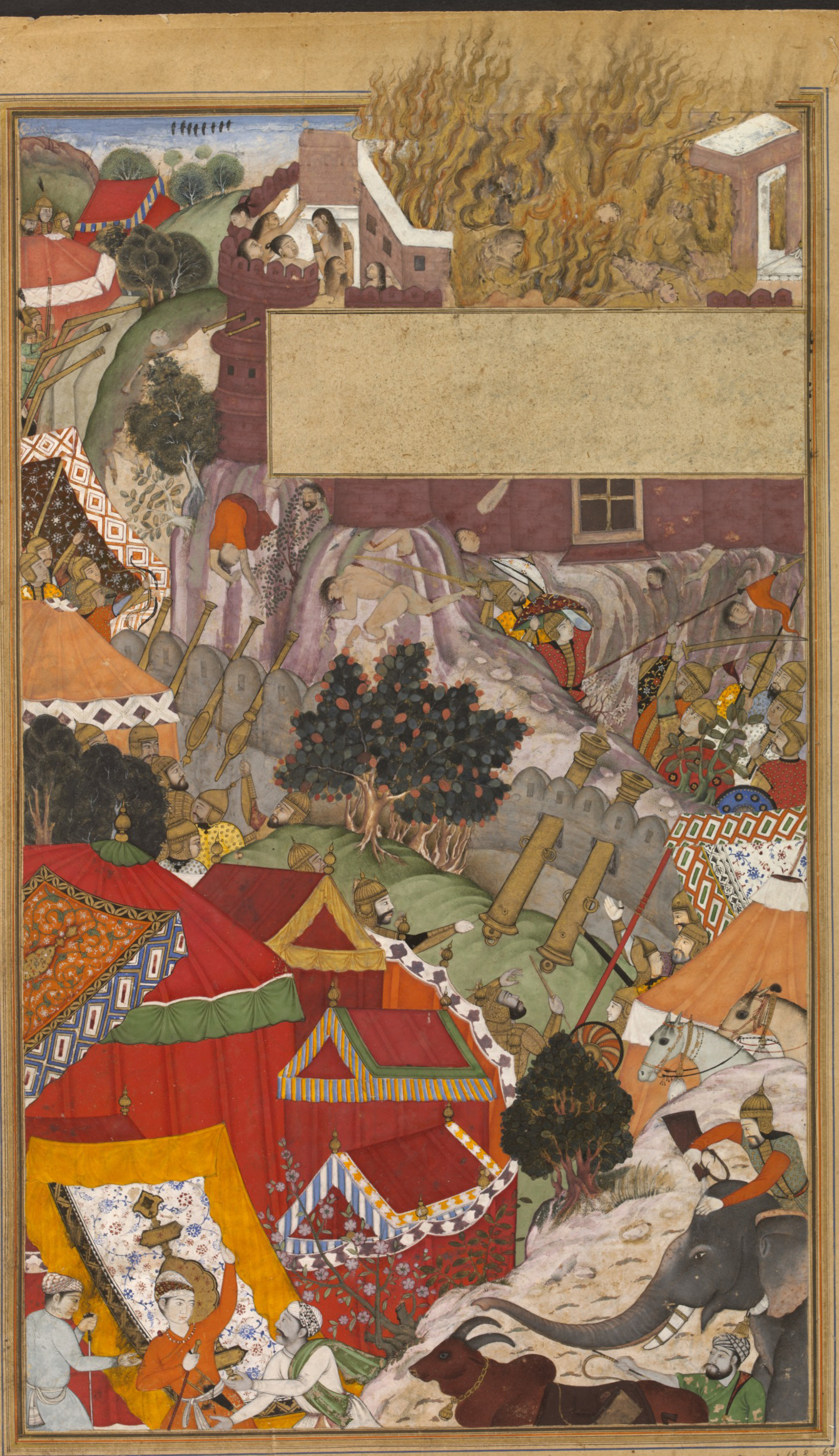
Rajput women committing Jauhar during Akbar's invasion.

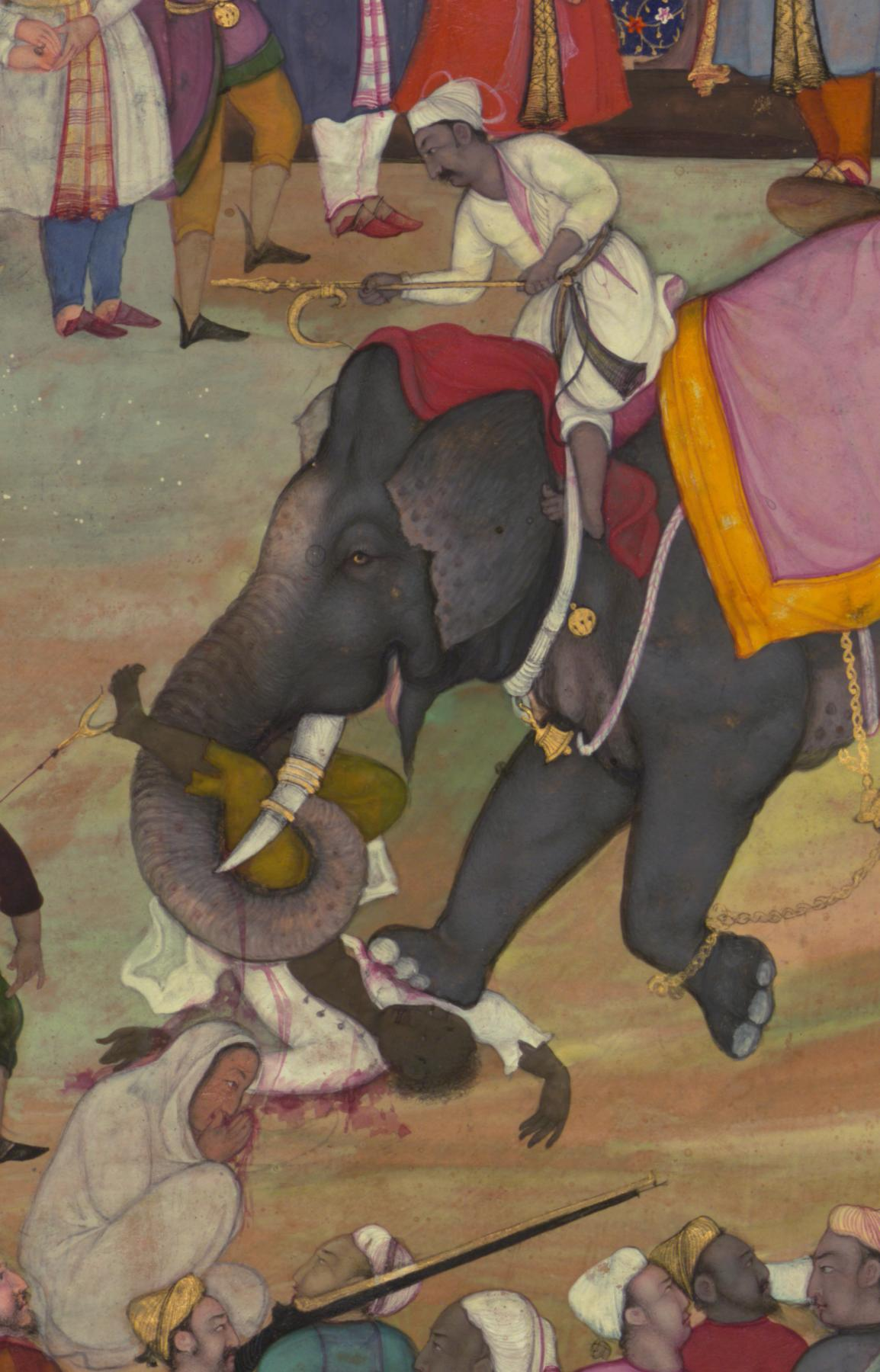
A War elephant executing the opponents of the Emperor Akbar.

==== Babur ====
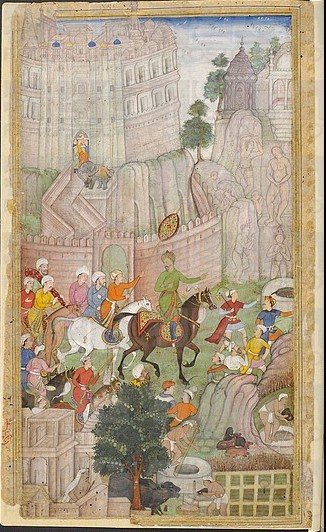
Babur and the Mughal Army at the Urvah valley in Gwalior.

A descendant of both Genghis Khan and Timur, Babur combined strength and courage with a love of beauty, and military ability with cultivation. He concentrated on gaining control of Northwestern India, doing so in 1526 by defeating the last Lodhi Sultan in the First battle of Panipat, a town north of Delhi. Babur then turned to the tasks of persuading his Central Asian followers to stay on in India and of overcoming other contenders for power, like the Rajputs and the Afghans. He succeeded in both tasks but died shortly thereafter in 1530. The Mughal Empire was one of the largest centralized states in pre-modern history and was the precursor to the British Indian Empire.

Babur was followed by his great-grandson, Shah Jahan (1628–1658), builder of the Taj Mahal and other magnificent buildings. Two other towering figures of the Mughal era were Akbar (r. 1556–1605) and Aurangzeb (r. 1658–1707). Both rulers expanded the empire greatly and were able administrators. However, Akbar was known for his religious tolerance and administrative genius while Aurangzeb was a pious Muslim and fierce advocate of more orthodox Islam.

==== Aurangzeb ====
While some rulers were zealous in their spread of Islam, others were relatively liberal. The Mughal emperor Akbar, an example of the latter established a new religion, Din-i Ilahi, which included beliefs from different faiths and even build many temples in his empire. He abolished the jizya twice. In contrast, his great-grandson Aurangzeb was a more religious and orthodox ruler. Aurangzeb's Deccan campaign saw one of the largest death tolls in South Asian history, with an estimated 4.6 million people killed during his reign, Muslims and Hindus alike. An estimated 2.5 million of Aurangzeb's army were killed during the Mughal–Maratha wars (100,000 annually during a quarter-century), while 2 million civilians in war-torn lands died due to drought, plague and famine. In the century-and-a-half that followed the death of Aurangzeb, effective Muslim control started weakening. Succession to imperial and even provincial power, which had often become hereditary, was subject to intrigue and force. The mansabdari system gave way to the zamindari system, in which high-ranking officials took on the appearance of hereditary landed aristocracy with powers of collecting rents. As Delhi's control waned, other contenders for power emerged and clashed, thus preparing the way for the eventual British takeover.

=== Durrani Empire ===
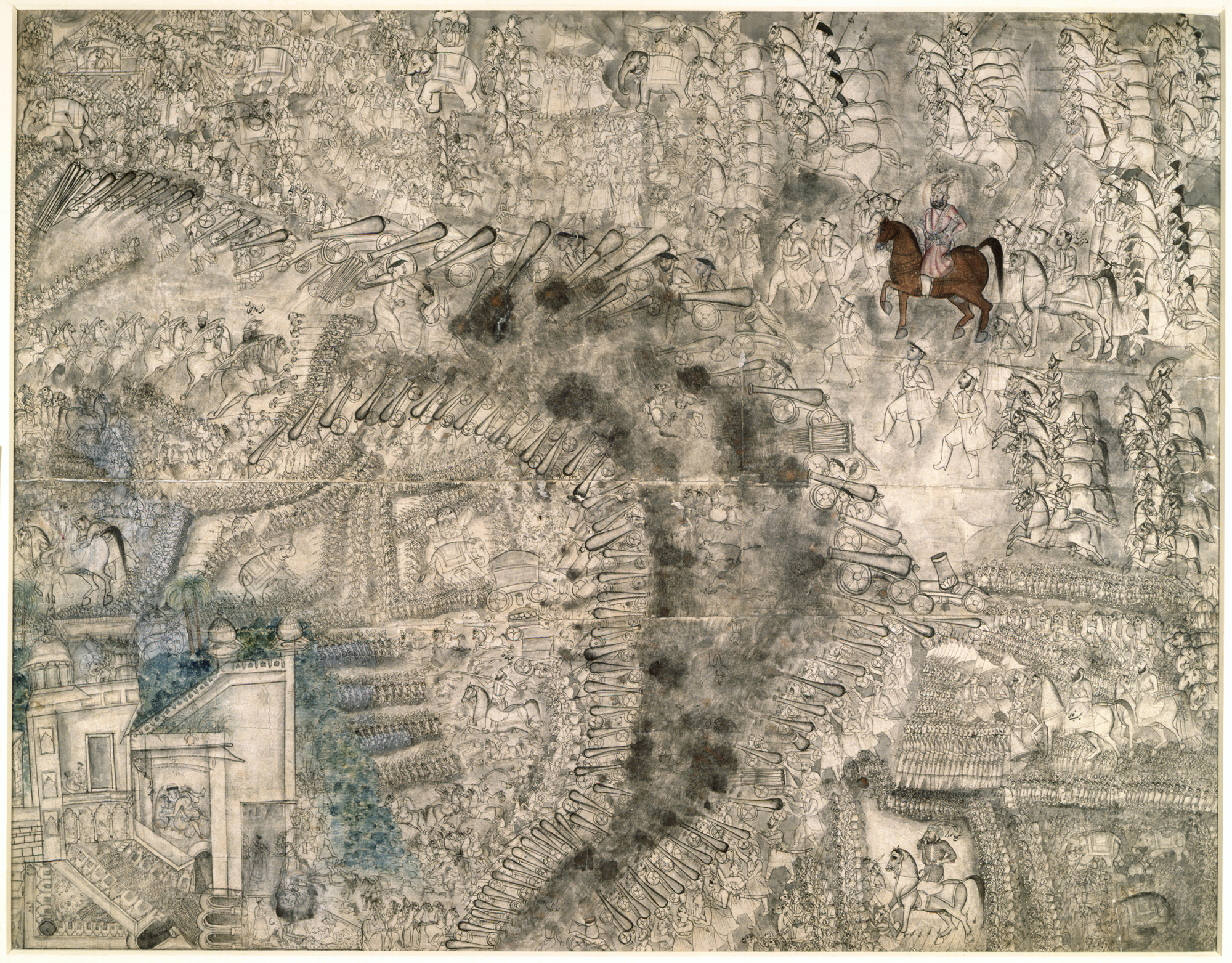
Ahmad Shah Durrani and his coalition defeated the Maratha Empire, during the Third Battle of Panipat and restored the Mughal emperor Shah Alam II.

Ahmed Shah Abdali – a Pashtun – embarked on conquest in South Asia starting in 1747. In the short time of just over a quarter of a century, he forged one of the largest Muslim empires of the 18th century. The high point of his conquests was his victory over the powerful Marathas in the Third Battle of Panipat, which occurred in 1761. On the Indian subcontinent, his empire stretched from the Indus at Attock all the way to the eastern Punjab. Uninterested in long-term of conquest or in replacing the Mughal Empire, he became increasingly pre occupied with revolts by the Sikhs. Vadda Ghalughara took place under the Muslim provincial government based at Lahore to wipe out the Sikhs, with non-combatant women, children and old men being killed, an offensive that had begun with the Mughals, with the Chhota Ghallughara. but after two months Sikh Misls again assembled and defeated Durranis in Battle of Harnaulgarh, Sikhs Capture Sirhind Labore Multan His empire began to unravel decade before his death in 1772.

== Decline of the Muslim rule ==
=== Maratha Empire ===
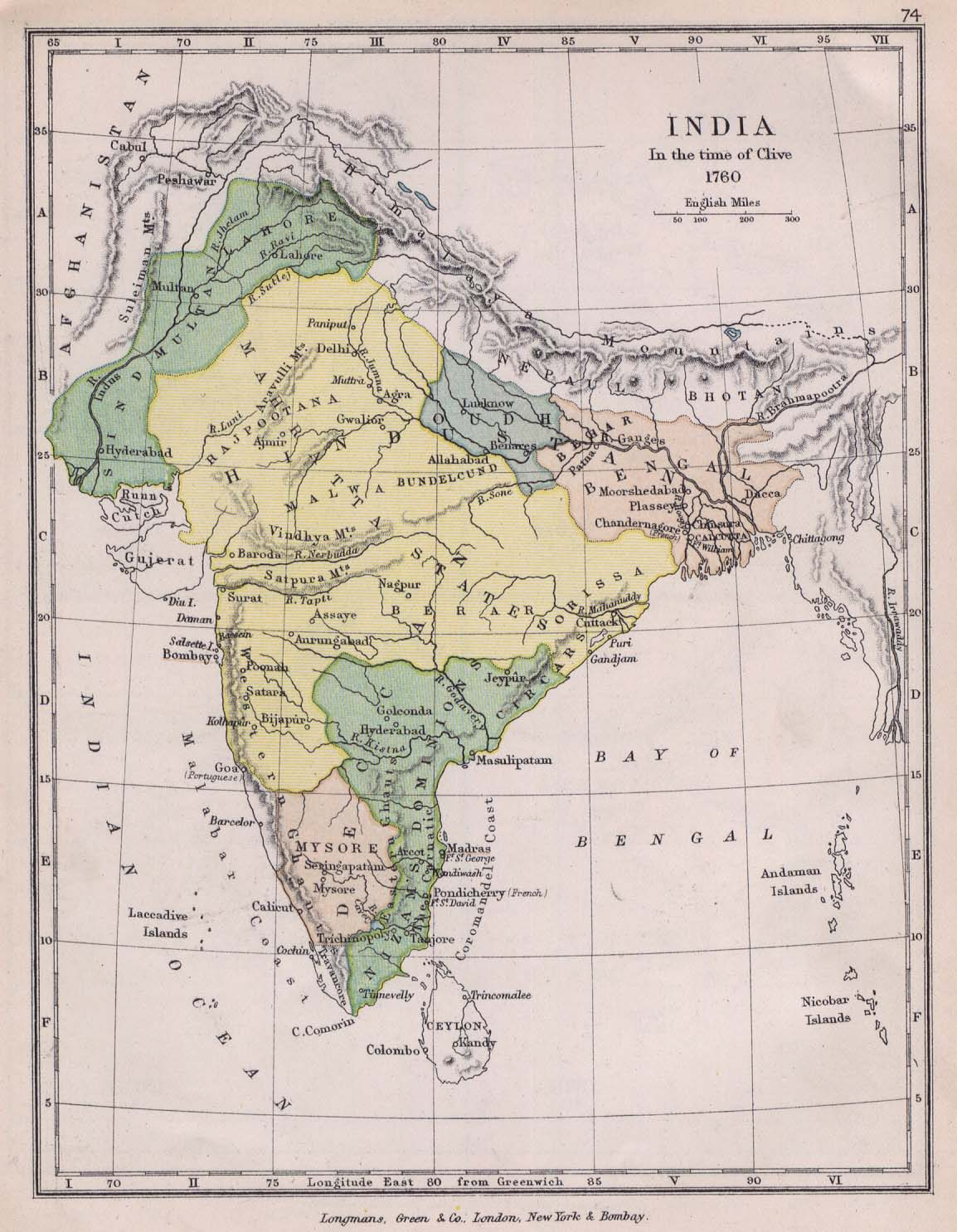
Maratha Empire (yellow area) at its zenith in 1760, stretching from the Deccan to present-day Pakistan

The single most important power to emerge in the Mughal dynasty was the Maratha Confederacy (1674–1818). The Marathas are responsible, to a large extent for ending Mughal rule in many parts of India. The Maratha Empire ruled large parts of India following the decline of the Mughals. The long and futile war bankrupted one of the most powerful empires in the world. Mountstuart Elphinstone termed this a demoralizing period for the Muslims as many of them lost the will to fight against the Maratha Empire. The Maratha empire at its peak stretched from Trichinopoly (present day Tiruchirappalli in Tamil Nadu) in the south to the Afghan border in the north. In early 1771, Mahadji, a notable Maratha general, recaptured Delhi and installed Shah Alam II as the puppet ruler on the Mughal throne. In north India, the Marathas thus regained the territory and the prestige lost as result of the defeat at Panipath in 1761.

=== Sikh Empire ===
Sikh Empire, established by Ranjit Singh in North-west India

In the Punjab, Mughal power waned in the seventeenth and eighteenth centuries. Successive bands of Sikhs attacked Lahore, and by 1780 partitioned it among themselves. Ranjit Singh unified the Sikh misldarsdhars (commanders) and made Lahore the administrative capital of the Sikh Empire in 1799. In Afghanistan, Zaman Shah Durrani was defeated by powerful Barakzai chief Fateh Khan who appointed Mahmud Shah Durrani as the new ruler of Afghanistan and appointed himself as Wazir of Afghanistan. Sikhs however were now superior to the Afghans and started to annex Afghan provinces. The biggest victory of the Sikh Empire over the Durrani Empire came in the Battle of Attock fought in 1813 between Sikh and Wazir of Afghanistan Fateh Khan and his younger brother Dost Mohammad Khan. The Afghans were routed by the Sikh army and the Afghans lost over 9,000 soldiers in this battle. Dost Mohammad was seriously injured whereas his brother Wazir Fateh Khan fled back to Kabul fearing that his brother was dead. In 1819, the Sikhs defeated the Afghans at Shopian and conquered Kashmir.

== Impact on India, Islam and Muslims in India ==
The impact of the Muslim conquests on the Indian subcontinent is a subject of considerable scholarly debate, reflecting a spectrum of interpretations regarding the socio-cultural, religious, and political transformations that ensued.

=== Divergent historical perspectives ===
Will Durant, an American historian, characterized the Islamic conquest of India as "probably the bloodiest story in history," emphasizing the extensive violence and destruction associated with the invasions.

Conversely, historians like Audrey Truschke and Romila Thapar argue that such portrayals are exaggerated and overlook the complexities of the period. Truschke highlights the Mughal emperors' engagement with Sanskrit culture, suggesting a degree of cultural integration. Thapar contends that the narrative of continuous Hindu persecution under Muslim rule is historically untenable, noting instances of patronage and coexistence.

=== Religious dynamics and social structures ===
The Muslim conquests introduced new administrative and religious frameworks. While some rulers enforced policies like the jizya tax on non-Muslims, others, such as Muhammad bin Qasim, reportedly reinstated local Brahmin officials and protected temples, indicating a pragmatic approach to governance.

The era witnessed significant cultural synthesis. Architectural styles blended Persian and Indian elements, and languages like Urdu emerged from the confluence of Persian, Arabic, and local dialects. Institutions such as the Aligarh Movement in the 19th century also aimed to modernize Muslim education for the British Indian population.

== Conversion of non-Muslims ==
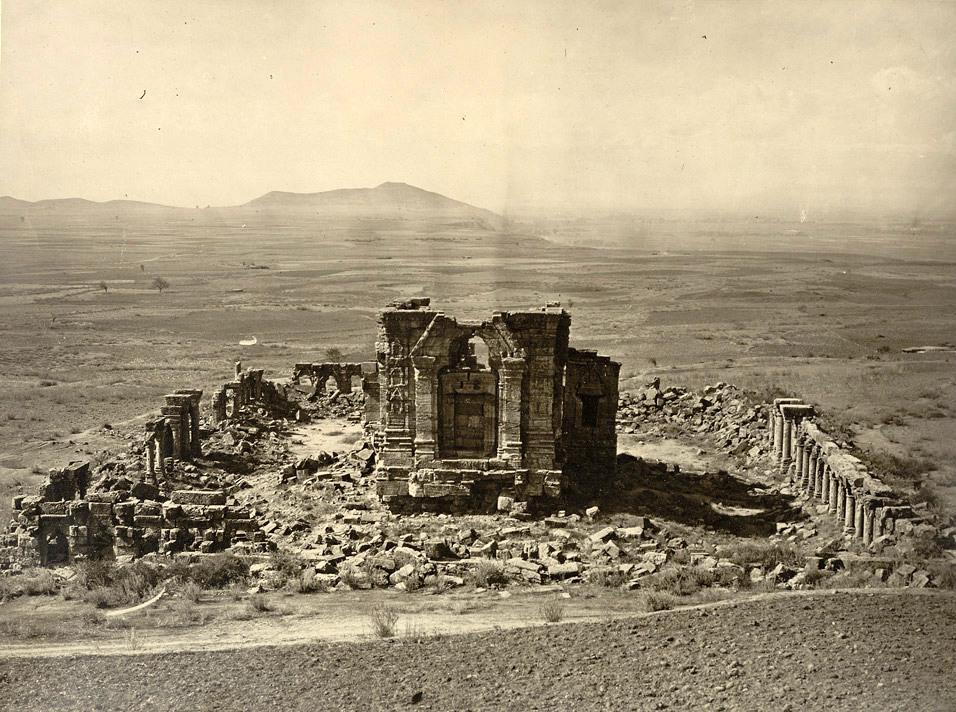
Ruins of the Surya Temple at Martand, which was destroyed due to the iconoclastic policies of Sikandar Butshikan, photo taken by John Burke in 1868.

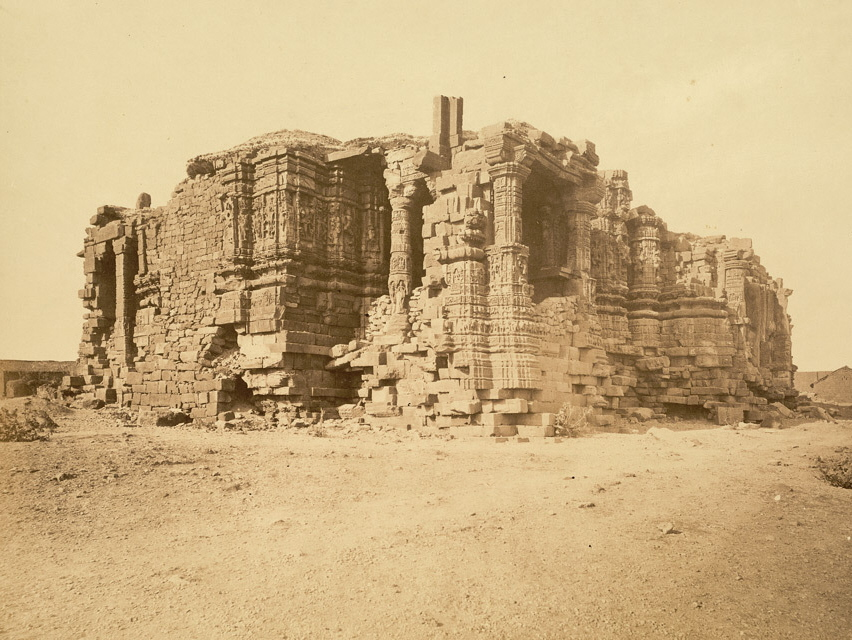
Somnath temple in ruins, 1869

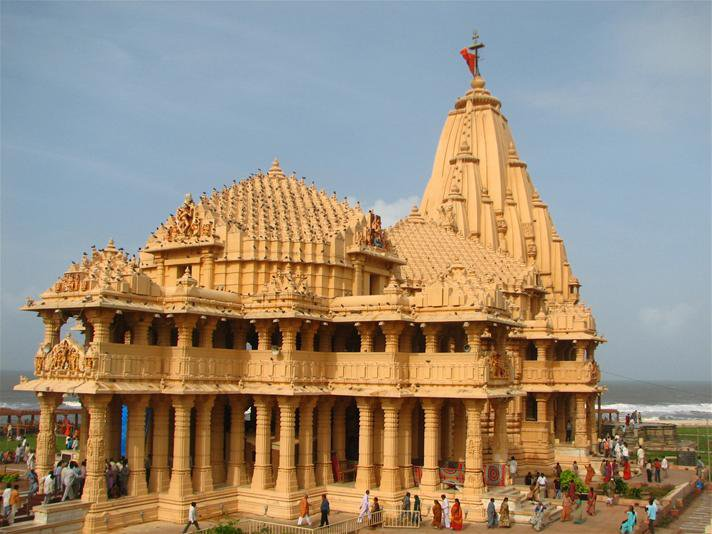
Front view of the present Somnath Temple

The Somnath temple was first attacked by Mahmud of Ghazni and repeatedly rebuilt.

Considerable controversy exists both in scholarly and public opinion about the conversions to Islam typically represented by the following schools of thought:

1. The bulk of Muslims are descendants of migrants from the Iranian Plateau or Arabs.
2. Conversion of slaves to Islam. Children fathered by Muslims by non-Muslim slaves would be raised Muslim. Non-Muslim women who birthed them would convert to Islam to avoid rejection by their own communities.
3. Conversions occurred for non-religious reasons of pragmatism and patronage such as social mobility among the Muslim ruling elite or for relief from taxes.
4. Conversion was a result of the actions of Sunni Sufi saints and involved a genuine change of heart.
5. Conversion came from Buddhists and the en masse conversions of lower castes for social liberation and as a rejection of the oppressive Hindu caste strictures.
6. A combination, initially made under duress followed by a genuine change of heart.
7. As a socio-cultural process of diffusion and integration over an extended period of time into the sphere of the dominant Muslim civilisation and global polity at large.

Embedded within this lies the concept of Islam as a foreign imposition and Hinduism being a natural condition of the natives who resisted, resulting in the failure of the project to Islamize the Indian subcontinent and is highly embroiled within the politics of the partition and communalism in India.

Historians such as Will Durant described Islamic invasions of India as "The bloodiest story in history. Jadunath Sarkar contends that several Muslim invaders were waging a systematic jihad against Hindus in India to the effect that "Every device short of massacre in cold blood was resorted to in order to convert heathen subjects".

Hindus who converted to Islam however were not completely immune to persecution due to the caste system among Muslims in India established by Ziauddin Barani in the Fatawa-i Jahandari, where they were regarded as an "Ajlaf" caste and subjected to discrimination by the "Ashraf" castes. Others argue that, during the Muslim conquests on the Indian subcontinent, Indian-origin religions experienced persecution from various Muslim conquerors who massacred Hindus, Jains and Buddhists, attacked temples and monasteries, and forced conversions on the battlefield.

Disputers of the "conversion by the sword" point to the presence of the large Muslim communities found in Southern India, Sri Lanka, Western Burma, Bangladesh, southern Thailand, Indonesia, Malaysia and the Philippines coupled with the distinctive lack of equivalent Muslim communities around the heartland of historical Muslim empires on the Indian subcontinent as a refutation to the "conversion by the sword theory". The legacy of the Muslim conquest of South Asia is a hotly debated issue and argued even today.

Muslim invaders were not all simply raiders. Later rulers fought on to win kingdoms and stayed to create new ruling dynasties. The practices of these new rulers and their subsequent heirs (some of whom were born to Hindu wives) varied considerably. While some were uniformly hated, others developed a popular following. According to the memoirs of Ibn Battuta who travelled through Delhi in the 14th century, one of the previous sultans had been especially brutal and was deeply hated by Delhi's population. Batuta's memoirs also indicate that Muslims from the Arab world, Persia and Anatolia were often favoured with important posts at the royal courts, suggesting that locals may have played a somewhat subordinate role in the Delhi administration. The term "Turk" was commonly used to refer to their higher social status. S.A.A. Rizvi (The Wonder That Was India – II) however points to Muhammad ibn Tughluq as not only encouraging locals but promoting artisan groups such as cooks, barbers and gardeners to high administrative posts. In his reign, it is likely that conversions to Islam took place as a means of seeking greater social mobility and improved social standing.

Numerous temples were destroyed by Muslim conquerors. Richard M. Eaton lists a total of 80 temples that were desecrated by Muslim conquerors, but notes this was not unusual in medieval India where numerous temples were also desecrated by Hindu and Buddhist kings against rival Indian kingdoms during conflicts between devotees of different Hindu deities, and between Hindus, Buddhists and Jains. He also notes there were many instances of the Delhi Sultanate, which often had Hindu ministers, ordering the protection, maintenance and repairing of temples.

K. S. Lal, in his book Growth of Muslim Population in Medieval India, claimed that between 1000 and 1500 the Indian population decreased by 30 million, but stated his estimates were tentative and did not claim any finality. His work has come under criticism by historians such as Simon Digby (SOAS, University of London) and Irfan Habib for its agenda and lack of accurate data in pre-census times. Different population estimates by economics historians Angus Maddison and Jean-Noël Biraben also indicate that India's population did not decrease between 1000 and 1500, but increased by tens of millions during that time. The Indian population estimates from other economic historians including Colin Clark, John D. Durand and Colin McEvedy also show there was a population increase in India between 1000 and 1500.

=== Expansion of trade ===
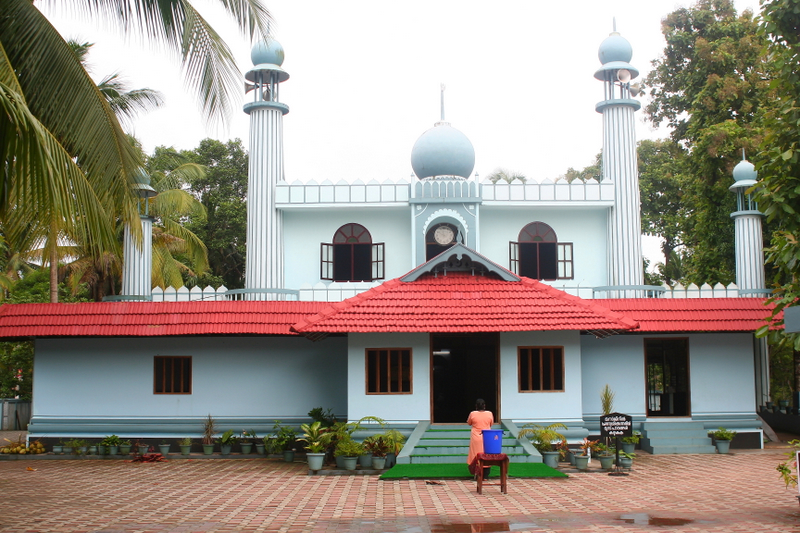
Cheraman Juma Masjid in Kerala

Expansion of trade brought India into contact with Islam. Arab traders settled in Indian ports. In the seventh century, they converted to Islam, giving rise to small Muslim communities. These communities grew due to Indian conversions and because Hindu kings of south India (such as the Cholas) hired Muslim mercenaries.

A significant aspect of the Muslim period in world history was the emergence of Islamic Shari'a courts capable of imposing a common commercial and legal system that extended from Morocco in the West to Mongolia in the North East and Indonesia in the South East. While southern India was already in trade with Arabs/Muslims, northern India found new opportunities. As the Hindu and Buddhist kingdoms of Asia were subjugated by Islam, and as Islam spread through Africa, it became a highly centralising force that facilitated in the creation of a common legal system that allowed letters of credit issued in say Egypt or Tunisia to be honoured in India or Indonesia (sharia has laws on the transaction of business with both Muslims and non-Muslims). To cement their rules, Muslim rulers initially promoted a system in which there was a revolving door between the clergy, the administrative nobility and the mercantile classes. The travels of explorer Muhammad Ibn-Abdullah Ibn-Batuta were eased because of this system. He served as an Imam in Delhi, as a judicial official in the Maldives, and as an envoy and trader in the Malabar. There was never a contradiction in any of his positions because each of these roles complemented the other. Islam created a compact under which political power, law and religion became fused in a manner so as to safeguard the interests of the mercantile class. This led world trade to expand to the maximum extent possible in the medieval world. Sher Shah Suri took initiatives in improvement of trade by abolishing all taxes which hindered progress of free trade. He built large networks of roads and constructed Grand Trunk Road (1540–1544), which connects Chittagong to Kabul; parts of it are still in use today. The geographic regions add to the diversity of languages and politics.

=== Cultural influence ===
The divide and rule policies, two-nation theory, and subsequent partition of British India in the wake of Independence from the British Empire has polarised the sub-continental psyche, making objective assessment hard in comparison to the other settled agricultural societies of India from the North West. Muslim rule differed from these others in the level of assimilation and syncretism that occurred. They retained their identity and introduced legal and administrative systems that superseded existing systems of social conduct and ethics. While this was a source of friction it resulted in a unique experience the legacy of which is a Muslim community strongly Islamic in character while at the same time distinctive and unique among its peers.

The impact of Islam on Indian culture has been described as significant. Some writers argue that it influenced various aspects of society, including language, dress, cuisine, art forms, architecture, urban design, and social customs and values. However, the extent and permanence of these influences remain debated among scholars.

The languages of the Muslim invaders were modified by contact with local languages, to Urdu, which uses the Arabic script. This language was also known as Hindustani, an umbrella term used for the vernacular terminology of Hindi as well as Urdu, both major languages in South Asia today derived primarily from Sanskrit grammatical structures and vocabulary.

Muslim rule saw a greater urbanisation of India and the rise of many cities and their urban cultures. The biggest impact was upon trade resulting from a common commercial and legal system extending from Morocco to Indonesia. This change of emphasis on mercantilism and trade from the more strongly centralised governance systems further clashed with the agricultural based traditional economy and also provided fuel for social and political tensions.

A related development to the shifting economic conditions was the establishment of Karkhanas, or small factories and the import and dissemination of technology through India and the rest of the world. The use of ceramic tiles was adopted from architectural traditions of Iraq, Iran, and Central Asia. Rajasthan's blue pottery was a local variation of imported Chinese pottery. There is also the example of Sultan Abidin (1420–1470) sending Kashmiri artisans to Samarqand to learn book-binding and paper making. Khurja and Siwan became renowned for pottery, Moradabad for brass ware, Mirzapur for carpets, Firozabad for glass wares, Farrukhabad for printing, Sahranpur and Nagina for wood-carving, Bidar and Lucknow for bidriware, Srinagar for papier-mache, Benaras for jewellery and textiles, and so on. On the flip-side encouraging such growth also resulted in higher taxes on the peasantry.

Numerous Indian scientific and mathematical advances and the Hindu numerals were spread to the rest of the world and much of the scholarly work and advances in the sciences of the age under Muslim nations across the globe were imported by the liberal patronage of arts and sciences by the rulers. The languages brought by Islam were modified by contact with local languages leading to the creation of several new languages, such as Urdu, which uses the modified Arabic script, but with more Persian words. The influences of these languages exist in several dialects in India today.

Islamic and Mughal architecture and art is widely noticeable in India, examples being the Taj Mahal and Jama Masjid. At the same time, Muslim rulers destroyed many of the ancient Indian architectural marvels and converted them into Islamic structures, most notably at Varanasi, Mathura, Ayodhya and the Kutub Complex in New Delhi.

=== Migration of Hindus ===
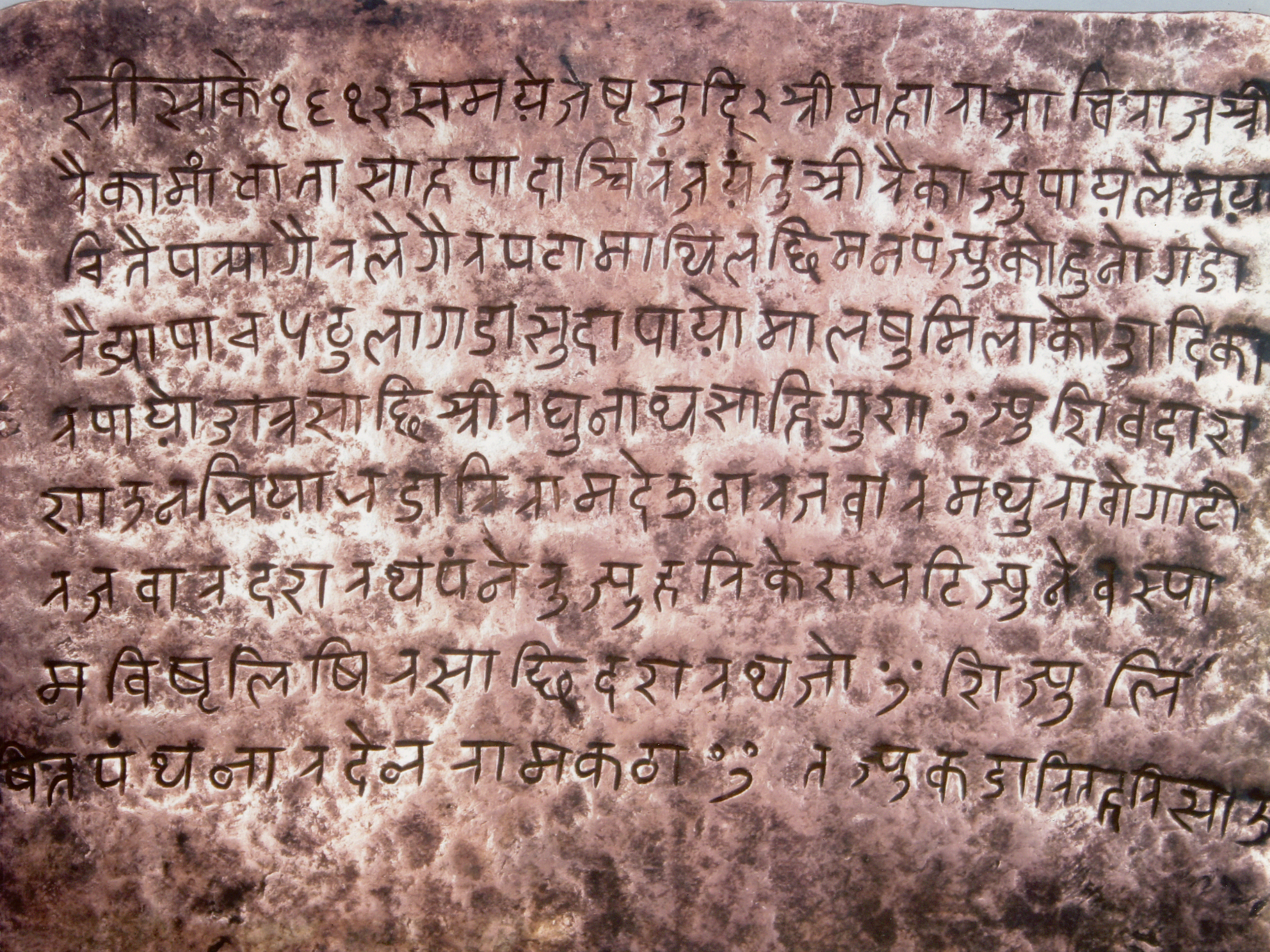
Copper Inscription by one of the Baise (22) King of Doti, Raika Mandhata Shahi on Saka Era, 1612 CE

Few groups of Hindus including Rajputs were entering what is today Nepal before the fall of Chittor due to regular invasions of Muslims in India. After the fall of Chittorgarh in 1303 by the Alauddin Khilji of the Khalji dynasty, Rajputs from the region immigrated in large groups into what is today Nepal due to heavy religious persecution. The incident is supported by both the Rajput and Nepalese traditions. (Note: Scottish scholar Francis Buchanan-Hamilton doubts the first tradition of Rajput influx to what is today Nepal which states that Rajputs from Chittor came to Ridi Bazaar in 1495 A.D. and went on to capture the Gorkha Kingdom after staying in Bhirkot. He mentions the second tradition which states that Rajputs reached Palpa through Rajpur at Gandak river. The third tradition mentions that Rajputs reached Palpa through Kumaon and Jumla.) Historian John T Hitchcock and John Whelpton contends that the regular invasions by Muslims led to heavy influx of Rajputs with Brahmins from the 12th century.

== Religious policies ==
=== General effect ===
Parts of India have been subject to Muslim rule from the period of Muhammad ibn Qasim till the fall of the Mughal Empire. While there is a tendency to view the Muslim conquests and Muslim empires as a prolonged period of violence against Hindu culture, (Note: Will Durant called the Muslim conquest of India "probably the bloodiest story in history".) in between the periods of wars and conquests, there were harmonious Hindu-Muslim relations in most Indian communities, and the Indian population grew during the medieval Muslim times. No populations were expelled based on their religion by either the Muslim or Hindu kings, nor were attempts made to annihilate a specific religion.

According to Romila Thapar, with the onset of Muslim rule all Indians, higher and lower caste were lumped together in the category of "Hindus". While higher-caste Indians regarded lower castes to be impure, they were now regarded as belonging to a similar category, which "in part accounts for the belief among many upper caste Hindus today that Hinduism in the last one thousand years has been through the most severe persecution that any religion in the world has ever undergone." Thapar further notes that "The need to exaggerate the persecution at the hands of the Muslim is required to justify the inculcation of anti-Muslim sentiments among the Hindus of today." Hindutva-allies have even framed the Muslim violence against Hindu expressions of faith as a "Hindu Holocaust".

Romila Thapar states that the belief in a severe persecution in the last millennium brushes away the "various expressions of religious persecution in India prior to the coming of the Muslims and particularly between the Śaiva and the Buddhist and Jaina sects". She questions what persecution means, and if it means religious conversions, she doubts that conversions can be interpreted as forms of persecution. It is quite correct to mention that Muslim iconoclasts destroyed temples and the broke images of Hindus, states Thapar, it should also be mentioned that Muslim rulers made donations to Hindu sects during their rule.

During the Islamic rule period, states David Lorenzen, there was state-sponsored persecution against Hindus, yet it was sporadic and directed mostly at Hindu religious monuments. According to Deepa Ollapally, the Mughal emperor Aurangzeb was clearly discriminatory towards Hindu and all other non-Muslims, displaying an "unprecedented level of religious bigotry", but perhaps this was a consequence of the opposition he faced from a number of his family members. During the medieval span, she states, "episodes of direct religious persecution of Hindus were rare", as were communal riots between Hindus and Muslims.

==== Destruction of religious architecture ====
According to Wink, the mutilation and destruction of Hindu religious idols and temples were an attack on Hindu religious practice, (Note: Devout Hindus cherish the manifestation of the divine everywhere such as in icons, people, and sacred places. Hinduism is "embedded in a sacred iconography, a sacred prosopography and a sacred geography", states Wink, images were considered "'aids' in contemplating the divine". These form the fundamental structure behind Hindu pilgrimage, mythology, festivals, and community just like the other major Indian religions.) and the Muslim destruction of religious architecture was a means to eradicate the vestiges of Hindu religious symbols. Muslim texts of this period justify it based on their contempt and abhorence for idols and idolators in Islamic thought. (Note: The Muslim court historians describe the desecrated sacred cities of Hindus in demeaning terms. For example, they describe Mathura – a sacred city of Krishna tradition in Hinduism – as "the work of demons (jinn)", and refer to the sacred idols as well as their worshippers (Hindus) as "devils" (shayatin). The architecture of Hindu temples changed under the Muslim rulers. The Vrindavan temples, built under Akbar, lack figurative ornamentation, most likely because of aniconism in Islam.) Jackson notes that the Muslim historians of the medieval era viewed the creation and expansion of Islamic Sultanates in Hindustan as "holy war" and a religious conquest, characterizing Muslim forces as "the army of Islam" and the Hindus as infidels. Yet, states Jackson, these records need to be interpreted and relied upon with care given their tendencies to exaggerate. This was not a period of "uncompromising iconoclasm", states Jackson. Cities that quickly surrendered to the Islamic army, says Jackson, "got a better deal" for their religious monuments.

According to Richard Davis, targeting sacred temples was not unique to Muslim rulers in India. Some Hindu kings too, prior to the formation of first Islamic sultanates in India, expropriated sacred idols from temples and took it back to their capitals as a political symbol of victory. However, the sacred temples, icons and the looted image carried away was still sacred and treated with respect by the victorious Hindu king and his forces, states Richard Davis. There is hardly any evidence of "mutilation of divine images and intentional defilement" of Hindu sacred icons or temples by armies in control of Hindu rulers. The evidence that is available suggests that the victorious Hindu kings undertook significant effort to house the expropriated images in new, grand temples within their kingdom. According to Wink, Hindu destruction of Buddhist and Jain places of worship took place before the 10th century, but the evidence for such 'Hindu iconoclasm' is incidental, too vague, and unconvincing. According to Wink, mutilation and defilement of sacred icons is rarely evidenced in Hindu texts, in contrast to Muslim texts on the Islamic iconoclasm in India.

==== Effect on Hindu learning ====
The destruction of temples and educational institutions, the killings of learned monks and the scattering of students, led to a widespread decline in Hindu education. With the fall of Hindu kings, science research and philosophy faced some setbacks due to a lack of funding, royal support, and an open environment. Despite unfavourable treatment under the Muslim rule, Brahmanical education continued and was also patronised by rulers like Akbar and others. Bukka Raya I, one of the founders of Vijaynagar Empire, had taken steps to rehabilitate Hindu religious and cultural institutions which suffered a serious setback under Muslim rule. Buddhists centres of learning decayed, leading to the rise to prominence of Brahmanical institutions.

While Sanskrit language and research on Vedantic philosophy faced a period of struggle, with Muslim rulers often targeting well-established and well-known educational institutions that were often suffering at the time, the traditional educational institutions in villages continued as before, vernacular regional languages based on Sanskrit thrived. A lot of Vedantic literature got translated into these languages between 12th to 15th centuries.

=== Muhammad bin-Qasim and the Chach Nama ===
Muslim conquest of the Indian subcontinent began in the early 8th century CE with a Muhammad ibn Qasim-led army. This campaign is narrated in the Chach Nama by Bakr Kūfī, a 13th-century manuscript which claimed to be based on an earlier Arabic record.

==== Content ====
The Chach Nama mentions temple demolitions, mass executions of resisting Sindhi forces and the enslavement of their dependents; kingdoms ruled by Hindu and Buddhist kings were attacked, their wealth plundered, tribute (kharaj) settled and hostages taken, often as slaves to Iraq. According to André Wink, a historian specializing in Indo-Islamic period in South Asia, these Hindus were given the choice to either convert to Islam and join the Arab armies, or be sealed (tattooing the hands) and pay Jizya (a tax). The Chach Nama and evidence in other pre-11th century Persian texts suggests that these Hindu Jats also suffered restrictions and discrimination as non-Muslims, as was then usual elsewhere for the non-Muslim subjects (ahl adh-dhimma) per the Islamic law (Sharia), states Wink.

Yohanan Friedmann however finds that the Chach Nama holds that most contemporary religious as well as political authorities collaborated with the invaders, and those who promptly surrendered were not only gifted with huge sums of money but also entrusted to rule conquered territories. Friedmann also notes that bin-Qasim "gave his unqualified blessing to the characteristic features of the society"—he reappointed every deposed Brahmin (of Brahmanabad) to their jobs, exempted them from Jizya, allowed holding of traditional festivals, and granted protection to temples but enforced the caste-hierarchy with enhanced vigor, drawing from Sharia, as evident from his treatment of Jats.Friedmann 1984, pp. 31–32 Overall, Friedmann concludes that the conquest, as described in the Chach Nama, did "not result in any significant changes in the structure of Indian society".

According to Johnson and Koyama, quoting Bosworth, there were "certainly massacres in the towns" in the early stages of campaign against pagan Hindus in Sind, but eventually they were granted dhimmi status and peace treaties were made with them.

After the conquest of Sindh, Qasim chose the Hanafi school of Islamic law which stated that, when under Muslim rule, people of Indic religions such as Hindus, Buddhists, and Jains are to be regarded as dhimmis (from the Arab term) as well as "People of the Book" and are required to pay jizya for religious freedom.

==== Doubtful source ====
The historicity of the Chach Nama has been questioned. Francesco Gabrieli considers the Chach Nama to be a "historical romance" which was "a late and doubtful source" for information about bin-Qasim and must be carefully sieved to locate the facts; on such a reading, he admired bin-Qasim's proclamations concerning "principle of tolerance and religious freedom". Peter Hardy takes a roughly similar stance and lenses the work as a work of "political theory". Manan Ahmed Asif criticizes the very premises of recovering portions of the Chach Nama as a historical chronicle of Muslim conquest; he argues that the site and times of production dictated its entire content, and that it must be read in entirety, as an original work in the genre of "political theory" where history is creatively extrapolated with romantic fiction to gain favor in the court of Nasiruddin Qabacha. Wink states that some scholars treat the Chach Nama and other Muslim texts of its era, as "largely pseudo-history". He concurs that the skepticism about each individual source is justified and the Chach Nama is part fiction. Yet, adds Wink, taken together the common elements in these diverse sources suggest that Hindus were treated as dhimmis and targeted for certain discriminatory measures prescribed in the Sharia, as well as entitled to protection and limited religious freedoms in a Muslim state.

=== Early sultanates (11th–12th century) ===
Muslim texts of that period are replete with iconoclast rhetoric, descriptions of mass-slaughter of Hindus, and repeat ad nauseam that "the army of Islam obtain[ed] abundant wealth and unlimited riches" from the conquered sites. The Hindus are described in these Islamic texts as infidels, Hindustan as war zone ("Dar-al-Harb"), and attacks on pagan Hindus as a part of a holy war (jihad), states Peter Jackson. However, states Wink, this killing was not systematic and "was normally confined to the 'fighting men'" though the wars and episodes of routine violence did precipitate a great famine with civilian casualties in tens of thousands. The pervasive and most striking feature of the Arabic literature on Sind and Hind of the 11th to 13th-century is its constant obsession with idol worship and polytheism in the Indian subcontinent. There is piecemeal evidence of iconoclasm that began in Sind region, but the wholesale and more systematic onslaught against major Hindu religious monuments is evidenced in North India.

Richard Eaton, Sunil Kumar, Romila Thapar, Richard H. Davis and others argue that these iconoclastic actions were not primarily driven by religious zeal, but were politically strategic acts of destruction in that temples in medieval India were sites associated with sovereignty, royal power, money, and authority. According to Wink, the iconoclasm was a product of "religious, economic and political" motives and the practice undoubtedly escalated due to the "vast amounts of immobilized treasure" in these temples. As the Indo-Islamic conquests of the 11th and 12th centuries moved beyond Panjab and the Himalayan foothills of the northwest into the Ganges-Yamuna Doab region, states Andre Wink, "some of the most important sacred sites of Indian culture were destroyed and desecrated," and their broken parts consistently reused to make Islamic monuments. (Note: Some of the evidence of desecration and destruction of Hindu sacred monuments is independent of the Muslim texts of the period. It is found in Islamic monuments built during this period. As examples, the Qutb mosque in Delhi shows its "reliance on disassembled temple materials", as do the Caurasi Kambha mosque near Bharatpur, the Jami Masjid at Sultankot (also called Ukha mandir mosque), the 'idgah in Bayana.) Phyllis Granoff notes that "medieval Indian religious groups faced a serious crisis as invading Muslim armies sacked temples and defaced sacred image".

The 11th and 12th centuries additionally witnessed the rise of irregulars and then Banjara-like groups who adopted Islam. These were "marauding bands" who caused much suffering and destruction in the countryside as they searched for food and supplies during the violent campaign of Ghurids against Hindustan. The religious icons of Hindus were one of the targets of these Islamic campaigns.

The 11th to 13th-century period did not witness any systematic attempts at forced conversions of Hindus into Muslims, nor is there evidence of widespread Islamicization in al-Hind that emerged from the violent conquest. The political power shifted from Hindu kings to Muslim sultans in conquered areas. If some temples were not destroyed in these areas, it did result in a loss to Hindu temple building patronage and an uprooting of Hindu sacred geography.

The second half of the 13th-century witnessed raids on Hindu kingdoms by Muslim forces controlling the northwest and north India, states Peter Jackson. These did not lead to sustained persecution of the Hindus in the targeted kingdoms, because the Muslim armies merely looted the Hindus, took cattle and slaves, then left. The raids caused suffering, yet also rallied the Islamic faithfuls and weakened the infidel prince by weakening his standing among his Hindu subjects. These raids were into Rajput kingdoms, those in central India, Lakhnawti–Awadh, and in eastern regions such as Bihar.

Numerous Islamic texts of that era, states Wink, also describe "forced transfer of enslaved Indian captives (ghilman-o-jawari, burda, sabaya), specially women and children" over the 11th century from Hindustan.

=== Delhi Sultanate (13th–16th century) ===
The Delhi Sultanate started in the 13th-century and continued through the early 16th century, when the Mughal conquest replaced it. The Delhi Sultans of this period saw themselves first and foremost as Islamic rulers, states Peter Jackson, for the "people of Islam". They were emphatically not "sultan of the Hindus". The Muslim texts of the Delhi Sultanate era treated Hindus with disdain, remarking "Hindus are never interesting in themselves, but only as converts, as capitation tax payers, or as corpses". These medieval Muslim rulers were "protecting and advancing the Islamic faith", with two Muslim texts of this period remarking that the Sultan had a duty "eradicate infidelity and humiliate his Hindu subjects".

Some of the conquered Hindu subjects of the Delhi Sultanate served these Sultans, who states Jackson, were "doubtless usually slaves". These Hindus built the mosques of this era as well as developed the Indo-Islamic architecture, some served the court in roles such as treasurers, clerks, minting of new coins, and others. These Hindus were not persecuted, instead some were rewarded with immunities and tax exemptions. Additionally, captured Hindu slaves were added as infantry troops in the Sultanate's army for their campaign against other Hindu kingdoms. Some Sultans adopted Indian customs such as ceremonial riding of elephants by kings, thus facilitating the public perception of the new monarch. This suggest that the Sultans cultivated some Hindus to serve their aims, rather than indiscriminately persecute every Hindu.

In general, Hindu subjects of Delhi Sultanate were generally accepted as people with dhimmi status, not equal to Muslims, but "protected", subject to Jizya tax and with a list of restrictions. Early Sultans of the Delhi Sultanate exempted the Brahmins from having to pay Jizya, thus dividing the Hindus and placing the discriminatory tax burden entirely on the non-Brahmin strata of the Hindu society. Firuz Shah was the first to impose the Jizya on Brahmins, and wrote in his autobiography that countless Hindus converted to Islam when he issued the edict that conversion would release them of the requirement to pay Jizya. This discrimination against Hindus was in force in the latter half of the 14th century, states Jackson, yet it is difficult to establish if and how this was enforced outside of the major centers under Muslim control.

The Muslim commanders of Delhi Sultanate regularly raided Hindu kingdoms for plunder, mulct their treasuries and looted the Hindu temples therein, states Jackson. These conquests of Delhi Sultanate armies damaged or destroyed many Hindu temples. Yet, in a few instances, after the war, the Sultans let the Hindus repair and reconstruct their temples. Such instances, states Jackson, has been cited by the Indian scholar P.B. Desai as evidence of "striking degree of tolerance" by Muslim Sultans. But, this happened in frontier areas after they had recently been conquered and placed in direct Muslim rule, where the Sultan's authority was "highly precarious". Within regions that was already under firm control of the Delhi Sultanate, the direct evidence of this is meagre. One example referred to is of a claimed request from the king of China to build a temple in India, as recorded by Ibn Battuta. That is questionable and has no corroborating evidence, states Jackson. Similar few examples near Delhi, such as one for Sri Krishna Bhagwan temple, cannot be verified whether they were ever built either.

Some modern era Indian texts mention that Hindu and Jain temples of Delhi Sultanate era received endowments from Muslim authorities, presenting these as evidence of lack of persecution during this period. It is "not beyond the bounds of possibility" that in some instances this happened. But generally, states Jackson, the texts and even the memoirs written by the some Sultans themselves describe how they "set about destroying new temples and replacing them with mosques", and in one case depopulated a town of Hindus and resettled Muslims there. Jackson clarifies that the evidence suggests that the destroyed temples were "new temples", and not the old one's near Delhi whose devotees were already paying regular Jizya to the Sultan's treasuries. In some cases, the policies on destroying or letting Hindus worship in their old temples changed as Sultans changed.

The Muslim nobles and advisors of the Sultans championed persecution of Hindus. The Muslim texts of that era, states Jackson, frequently mention themes such as the Hindu "infidels must on no account be allowed to live in ease and affluence", they should not be treated as "Peoples of the Book" and the Sultan should "at least refrain from treating Hindus with honour or permitting idolatry in the capital". Failure to slaughter the Hindus has led to polytheism taking root. Another wazir while theoretically agreeing to these view, stated that this would not be practical given the small population of Muslims and such a policy should be deferred till Muslims were in a stronger position. If eradication of Hindus is not possible, suggested another Muslim official, then the Hindus should at least be insulted, disgraced and dishonored. These views were not exceptions, rather consistent with Islamic thinking of that era and are "commonly encountered in polemical writing against the infidel in different parts of the Islamic world at different times", states Jackson. This antagonism towards Hindus may have other general reasons, such as the fear of apostasy given the tendency of everyday Muslims to join in with Hindus as they celebrated their religious festivals. Further, the succession struggle after the death of a Sultan usually led to political maneuvering by the next Sultan, where depending on the circumstances, the victor championed either the orthodox segment of the Islamic clergy and jurists, or gave concessions to the Hindus and other groups for support when the Sultanate facing a military threat from outside.

=== Madurai Sultanate ===
==== First campaigns ====
The army of Ala al-Din Khalji from Delhi Sultanate began their first campaign in 1310 against the Hindu kingdom in Madurai region – called Ma'bar by court historians, under the pretext of helping Sundar Pandya. According to Mehrdad Shokoohy – a scholar of Islamic studies and architectural history in Central and South Asia – this campaign lasted for a year during which Madurai and other Tamil region cities were overrun by the Muslims, the Hindu temples were demolished and the towns looted. A detailed record about the campaign by Amir Khusrau the destruction and plunder.

A second destructive campaign was launched by Mubarak Shah, Ala al-Din Khalji's successor. While the looted wealth was sent to Delhi, a Muslim governor was appointed for the region. The governor later rebelled, founded the short lived Madurai Sultanate and renamed himself as Sultan Ahsan Shah in 1334. The successive sultans of the new Sultanate did not have the support of the regional Hindu population. The Madurai Sultanate's army, states Shokoohy, "often exercised fierce and brutal repressive methods on the local people". The Sultanate faced constant battles with neighboring Hindu states and assassination by its own nobles. Sultan Sikandar Shah was the last sultan. He was killed by the invading forces of Vijayanagara Empire army in 1377.

The Muslim literature of this period record the motive of the Madurai Sultans. For example, Sultan Shams al-Din Adil Shah's general is described as leaving for "holy war against the infidels and taking from them great wealth and a vast amount of booty". Another record states, "he engaged in a holy war (ghaza) and killed a great number of infidels". Madurai region has several Islamic shrines with tombs built during this period, such as one for Ala al-Din and Shams al-Din. In this shrine, the inner columns are irregular and vary in form showing evidence of "reused material". The "destruction of temples and the re-use of their materials", states Shokoohy, was a "practice of the early Sultanates of North India, and we may assume that this tradition was brought to the south by the sultans of Ma'bar".

The Madurai Sultanate "sacked and desecrated Hindu temples throughout the Tamil country", and these were restored and reconsecrated for worship by the Vijayanagara rulers, states the Indologist Crispin Branfoot.

=== Mughal Empire ===
The Mughal emperor Akbar has been a celebrated unusual example of tolerance. Indologist Richard Eaton writes that from Akbar's time to today, he has attracted conflicting labels, "from a strict Muslim to an apostate, from a free-thinker to a crypto-Hindu, from a Zoroastrian to a proto-Christian, from an atheist to a radical innovator". As a youth, states Eaton, Akbar studied Islam under both Shia and Sunni tutors, but as an adult he looked back with regret on his early life, confessing that in those days he had "persecuted men into conformity with my faith and deemed it Islam". In his later years he felt "an internal bitterness, acknowledging that his soul had been 'seized with exceeding sorrow'" for what he had done before launching his campaign to "treat all Mughal subjects, regardless of religion, on a basis of legal equality before the state".

==== Aurangzeb ====
The reign of Aurangzeb (1658–1707) witnessed one of the strongest campaigns of religious violence in the Mughal Empire's history. Aurangzeb is a controversial figure in modern India, often remembered as a "vile oppressor of Hindus". During his rule Aurangzeb expanded the Mughal Empire, conquering much of southern India through long bloody campaigns against non-Muslims. He forcibly converted Hindus to Islam and destroyed Hindu temples. He also re-introduced the jizya, a tax on non-Muslims, which had been suspended for the previous 100 years by his great-grandfather Akbar.

Aurangzeb ordered the desecration and destruction of temples when conquering new lands and putting down rebellions, punishing political leaders by destroying the temples that symbolized their power. In 1669 he issued orders to all his governors of provinces to "destroy with a willing hand the schools and temples of the infidels, and that they were strictly enjoined to put an entire stop to the teaching and practice of idolatrous forms of worship". According to Richard Eaton these orders appear to have been directed not toward Hindu temples in general, but towards a more narrowly defined "deviant group". The number of Hindu temples destroyed or desecrated under Aurangzeb's rule is unclear, but may have been grossly exaggerated, (Note: Number of temples destroyed: * Avari (2013, p. 115) citing a 2000 study, writes "Aurangzeb was perhaps no more culpable than most of the Sultans before him; they desecrated the temples associated with Hindu power, not all temples. It is worth noting that, in contrast to the traditional claim of hundreds of Hindu temples having been destroyed by Aurangzeb, a recent study suggests a modest figure of just fifteen destructions." * Truschke 2017, p. 85: "Nobody knows the exact number of temples demolished or pillaged on Aurangzeb's orders, and we never will. Richard Eaton, the leading authority on the subject, puts the number of confirmed temple destructions during Aurangzeb's rule at just over a dozen, with fewer tied to the emperor's direct commands. Other scholars have pointed out additional temple demolitions not counted by Eaton, such as two orders to destroy the Somanatha Temple in 1659 and 1706 (the existence of a second order suggests that the first was never carried out). Aurangzeb also oversaw temple desecrations. For example, in 1645 he ordered mihrabs (prayer niches, typically located in mosques) erected in Ahmedabad's Chintamani Parshvanath Temple, built by the Jain merchant Shantidas. Even adding in such events, however, to quote Eaton, "the evidence is almost always fragmentary, incomplete, or even contradictory". Given this, there were probably more temples destroyed under Aurangzeb than we can confirm (perhaps a few dozen in total?), but here we run into a dark curtain drawn across an unknown past." In contrast, the historian Abraham Eraly estimates Aurangzeb era destruction to be significantly higher; "in 1670, all temples around Ujjain were destroyed"; and later, "300 temples were destroyed in and around Chitor, Udaipur and Jaipur" among other Hindu temples destroyed elsewhere in campaigns through 1705.) and he probably built more temples than he destroyed. According to Ikram, "Aurangzeb tried to enforce strict Islamic law by ordering the destruction of newly built Hindu temples. Later, the procedure was adopted of closing down rather than destroying the newly built temples in Hindu localities. It is also true that very often the orders of destruction remained a dead letter." Some temples were destroyed entirely; in other cases mosques were built on their foundations, sometimes using the same stones. Idols in temples were smashed, and the city of Mathura was temporarily renamed as Islamabad in local official documents.

The persecution during the Islamic period targeted non-Hindus as well. (Note: Avari writes, "Aurangzeb's religious policy caused friction between him and the ninth Sikh guru, Tegh Bahadur. In both Punjab and Kashmir the Sikh leader was roused to action by Aurangzeb's excessively zealous Islamic policies. Seized and taken to Delhi, he was called upon by Aurangzeb to embrace Islam and, on refusal, was tortured for five days and then beheaded in November 1675. Two of the ten Sikh gurus thus died as martyrs at the hands of the Mughals.) In some cases, such as towards the end of Mughal era, the violence and persecution was mutual. Hindus too attacked and damaged Muslim tombs, even when the troops had orders not to harm religious refuges of Muslims. These "few examples of disrespect for Islamic sites", states Indologist Nicholas Gier, "pale in comparison to the great destruction of temples and general persecution of Hindus by Muslims for 500 years". Sources document brutal episodes of persecution. Sikh texts, for example, document their "Guru Teg Bahadur accompanying sixteen Hindu Brahmins on a quest to stop Mughal persecution of Hindus; they were arrested and commanded to convert to Islam on pain of torture and death", states Gier, "they all refused, and in November 1675, Mati Das was sawed in half, Dayal Das was boiled alive, Sati Das was burned alive, and Teg Bahadar was beheaded."

== Iconoclasm ==
=== During the Muslim conquest of Sindh (Sindh Region) ===
Historian Upendra Thakur records the persecution of Hindus and Buddhists:

Muhammad [bin Qasim] trriumphantly marched into the country, conquering Debal, Sehwan, Nerun, Brahmanadabad, Alor and Multan one after the other in quick succession, and in less than a year and a half, the far-flung Hindu kingdom was crushed ... 'There was a fearful out-break of religious bigotry in several places and temples were wantonly desecrated. At Debal, Nairun and Aror temples were demolished and converted into mosques'.

=== Iconoclasm under the Delhi Sultanate ===
Iconoclasm under the Delhi Sultanate

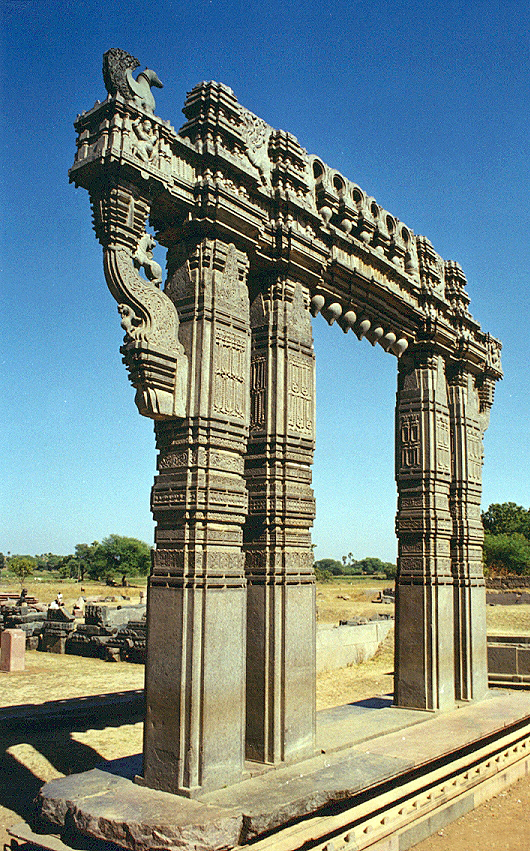
Kakatiya Kala Thoranam (Warangal Gate) built by the Kakatiya dynasty in ruins; one of the many temple complexes destroyed by the Delhi Sultanate.

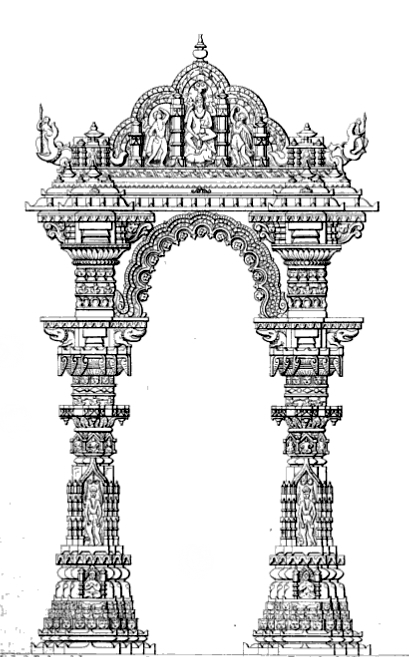
Artistic rendition of the Kirtistambh at Rudra Mahalaya Temple. The temple was destroyed by Alauddin Khalji.

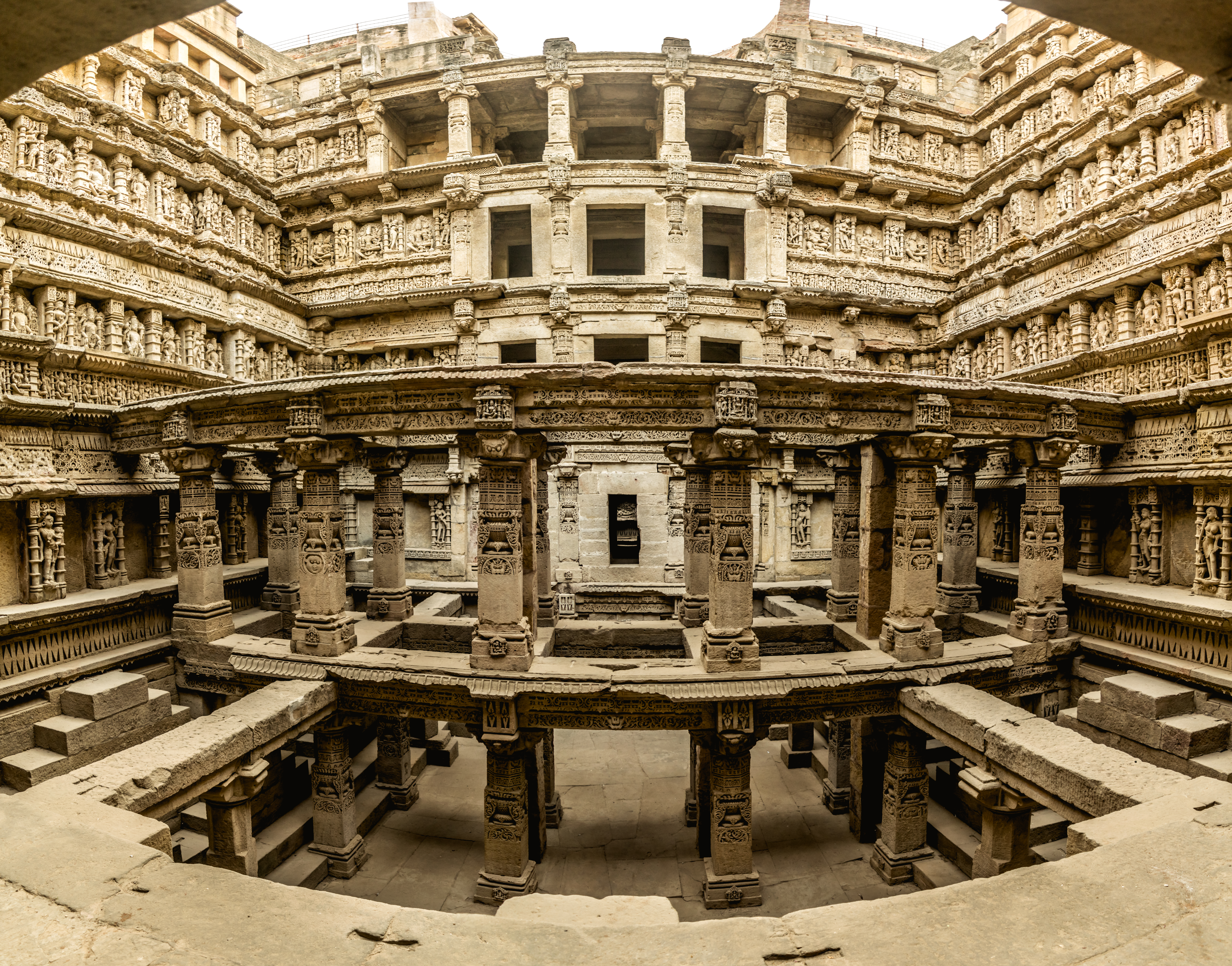
Rani ki vav is a stepwell, built by the Chaulukya dynasty, located in Patan; the city was sacked by Sultan of Delhi Qutb-ud-din Aybak between 1200 and 1210, and it was destroyed by Allauddin Khilji in 1298.

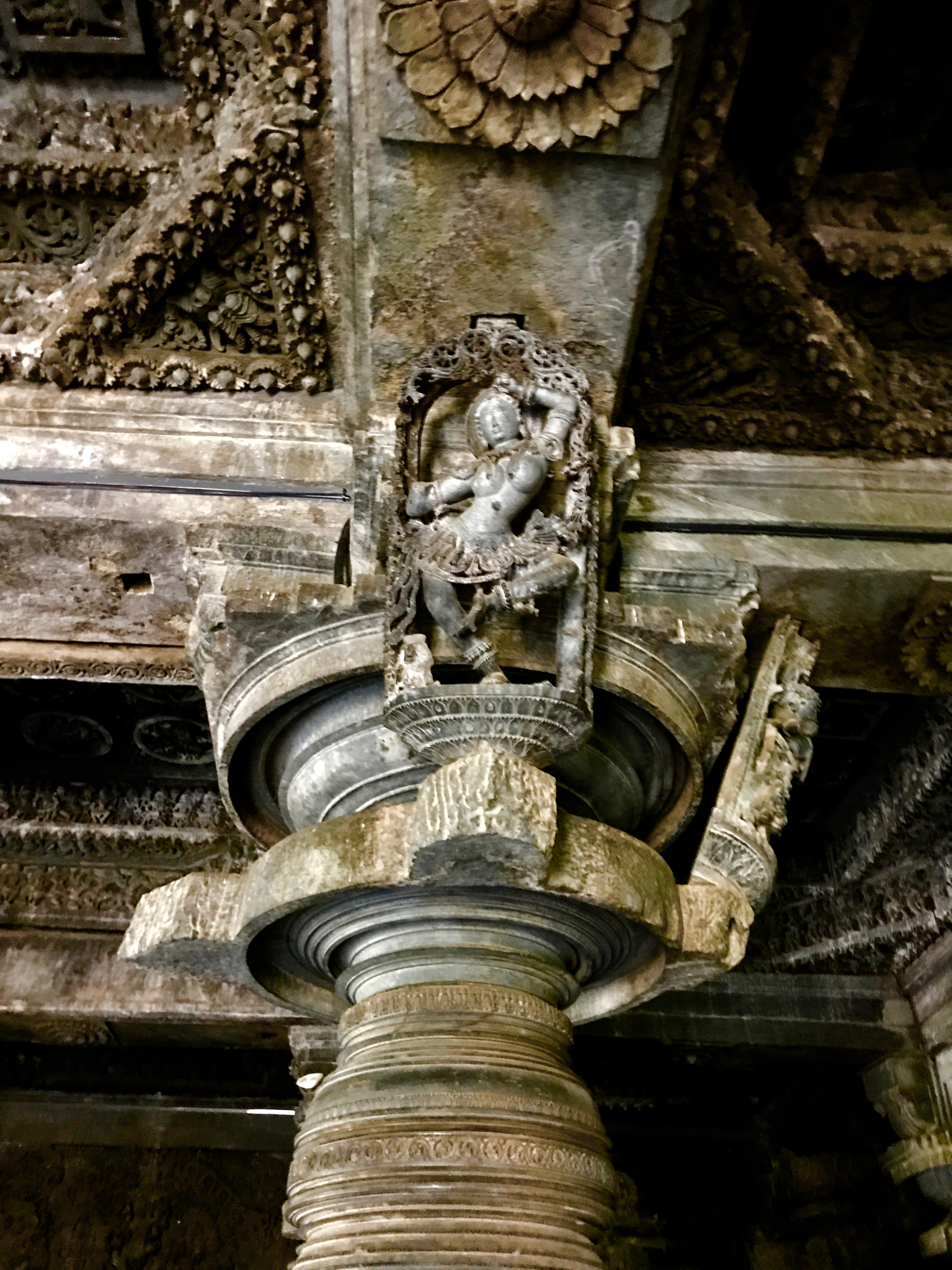
Pillar and ceiling carvings with a damaged madanakai at Hoysaleswara Temple. The temple was twice sacked and plundered by the Delhi Sultanate.

Historian Richard Eaton has tabulated a campaign of destruction of idols and temples by Delhi Sultans, intermixed with instances of years where the temples were protected from desecration. In his paper, he has listed 37 instances of Hindu temples being desecrated or destroyed in India during the Delhi Sultanate, from 1234 to 1518, for which reasonable evidence is available. He noted that this was not unusual in medieval India, as there were numerous recorded instances of temple desecration by Hindu and Buddhist kings against rival Indian kingdoms between 642 and 1520, involving conflict between devotees of different Hindu deities, as well as between Hindus, Buddhists and Jains. He also noted there were also many instances of Delhi sultans, who often had Hindu ministers, ordering the protection, maintenance and repairing of temples, according to both Muslim and Hindu sources. For example, a Sanskrit inscription notes that Sultan Muhammad bin Tughluq repaired a Siva temple in Bidar after his Deccan conquest. There was often a pattern of Delhi sultans plundering or damaging temples during conquest, and then patronizing or repairing temples after conquest. This pattern came to an end with the Mughal Empire, where Akbar's chief minister Abu'l-Fazl criticized the excesses of earlier sultans such as Mahmud of Ghazni.

In many cases, the demolished remains, rocks and broken statue pieces of temples destroyed by Delhi sultans were reused to build mosques and other buildings. For example, the Qutb complex in Delhi was built from stones of 27 demolished Hindu and Jain temples by some accounts. Similarly, the Muslim mosque in Khanapur, Maharashtra was built from the looted parts and demolished remains of Hindu temples. Muhammad bin Bakhtiyar Khalji destroyed Buddhist and Hindu libraries and their manuscripts at Nalanda and Odantapuri Universities in 1193 CE at the beginning of the Delhi Sultanate.

The first historical record in this period of a campaign of destruction of temples and defacement of faces or heads of Hindu idols lasted from 1193 through 1194 in Rajasthan, Punjab, Haryana and Uttar Pradesh under the command of Ghuri. Under the Mamluks and Khaljis, the campaign of temple desecration expanded to Bihar, Madhya Pradesh, Gujarat and Maharashtra, and continued through the late 13th century. Orissa temples were destroyed in the 14th century under the Tughlaqs.

Beyond destruction and desecration, the sultans of the Delhi Sultanate in some cases had forbidden reconstruction or repair of damaged Hindu, Jain and Buddhist temples. In certain cases, the Sultanate would grant a permit for repairs and construction of temples if the patron or religious community paid jizya (fee, tax). For example, according to Ibn Battuta's account, a proposal by the Yuan dynasty emperor of China to repair Himalayan Buddhist temples destroyed by the Sultanate army was refused, on the grounds that such temple repairs were only allowed if the Chinese agreed to pay jizya tax to the treasury of the Sultanate. According to Eva De Clercq, an expert in the study of Jainism, the Delhi Sultans did not strictly prohibit construction of new temples in the sultanate, Islamic law notwithstanding. In his memoirs, Firoz Shah Tughlaq describes how he destroyed temples and built mosques instead and killed those who dared build new temples. Other historical records from wazirs, amirs and the court historians of various Sultans of the Delhi Sultanate describe the grandeur of idols and temples they witnessed in their campaigns and how these were destroyed and desecrated.

=== Nalanda ===
In 1193, the Nalanda University complex was destroyed by Khalji under Bakhtiyar Khalji; this event is seen as the final milestone in the decline of Buddhism in India. He also burned Nalanda's major Buddhist library and Vikramshila University, as well as numerous Buddhist monasteries in India. When the Tibetan translator, Chag Lotsawa Dharmasvamin (Chag Lo-tsa-ba, 1197–1264), visited northern India in 1235, Nalanda was damaged, looted, and largely deserted, but still standing and functioning with seventy students.

Mahabodhi, Sompura, Vajrasan and other important monasteries were found to be untouched. The Ghuri ravages only afflicted those monasteries that lay in the direct path of their advance and were fortified in the manner of defensive forts.

By the end of the 12th century, following the Muslim conquest of the Buddhist stronghold in Bihar, Buddhism, having already declined in the South, declined in the North as well because survivors retreated to Nepal, Sikkim and Tibet or escaped to the South of the Indian sub-continent.

=== Martand ===
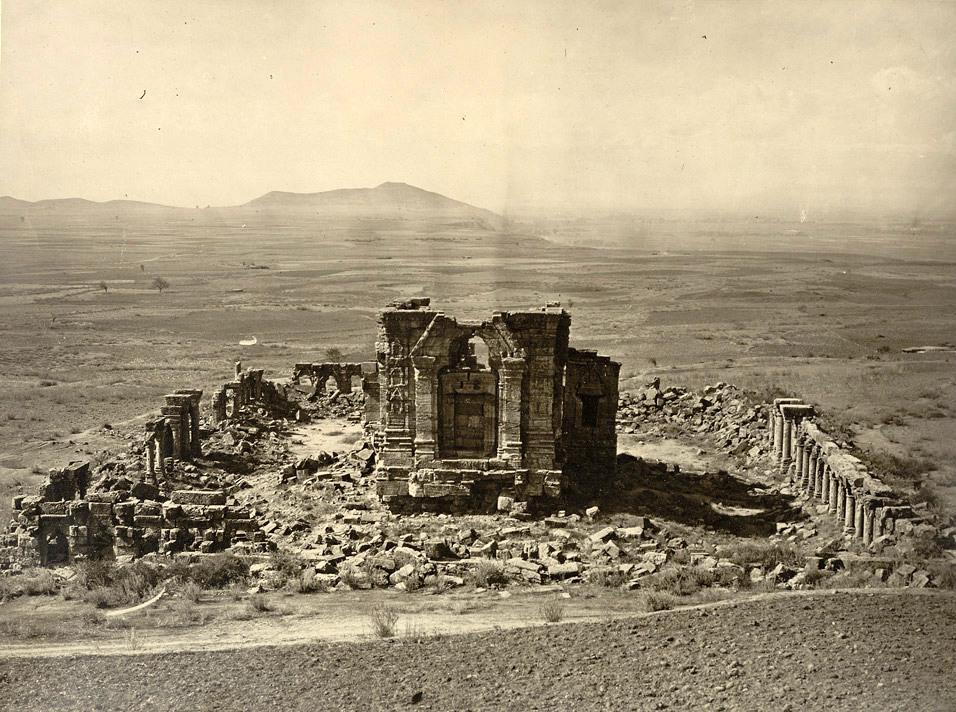
Ruins of the Surya Temple at Martand, which was destroyed due to the iconoclastic policies of Sikandar Butshikan, photo taken by John Burke in 1868

The Martand Sun Temple was built by the third ruler of the Karkota dynasty, Lalitaditya Muktapida, in the 8th century CE. The temple was completely destroyed on the orders of the Muslim ruler Sikandar Butshikan in the early 15th century, with demolition lasting a year. He is remembered for his strenuous efforts to convert the Hindus of Kashmir to Islam. These efforts included the destruction of numerous old temples, prohibition of Hindu rites and rituals, and even the wearing of clothes in the Hindu style.

=== Vijayanagara ===
The city flourished between the 14th century and 16th century, during the height of the Vijayanagara Empire. During this time, it was often in conflict with the kingdoms which rose in the Northern Deccan, and which are often collectively termed the Deccan sultanates. The Vijaynagara Empire successfully resisted Muslim invasions for centuries. But in 1565, the empire's armies suffered a massive and catastrophic defeat at the hands of an alliance of the Sultanates, and the capital was taken. The victorious armies then razed, depopulated and destroyed the city over several months. The empire continued its slow decline, but the original capital was not reoccupied or rebuilt.

=== Somnath ===
Around 1024 CE, during the reign of Bhima I, Mahmud of Ghazni raided Gujarat, and plundered the Somnath temple. According to an 1169 inscription, Bhima rebuilt the temple. This inscription does not mention any destruction caused by Mahmud, and states that the temple had "decayed due to time". In 1299, Alauddin Khalji's army under the leadership of Ulugh Khan defeated Karandev II of the Vaghela dynasty, and sacked the Somnath temple. In 1665, the temple, was once again ordered to be destroyed by Mughal emperor Aurangzeb. In 1702, he ordered that if Hindus had revived worship there, it should be demolished completely.

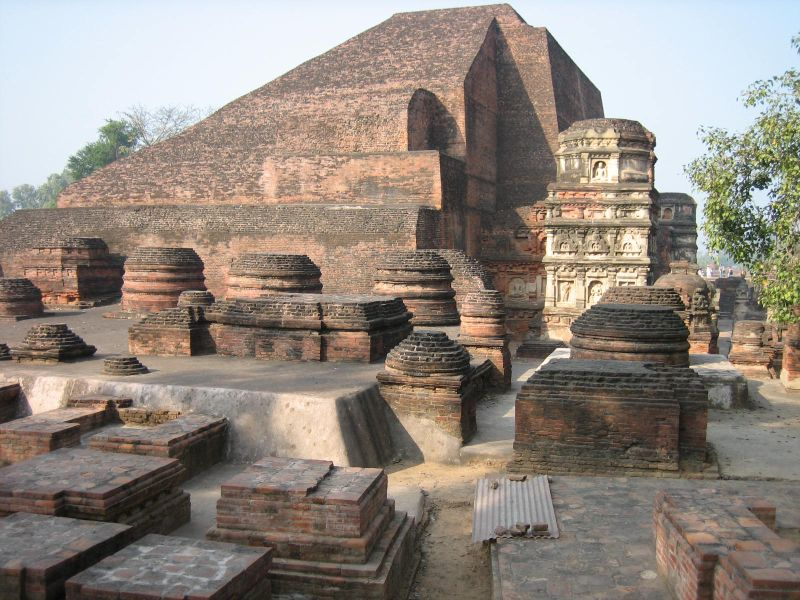
Ruins of Nalanda University

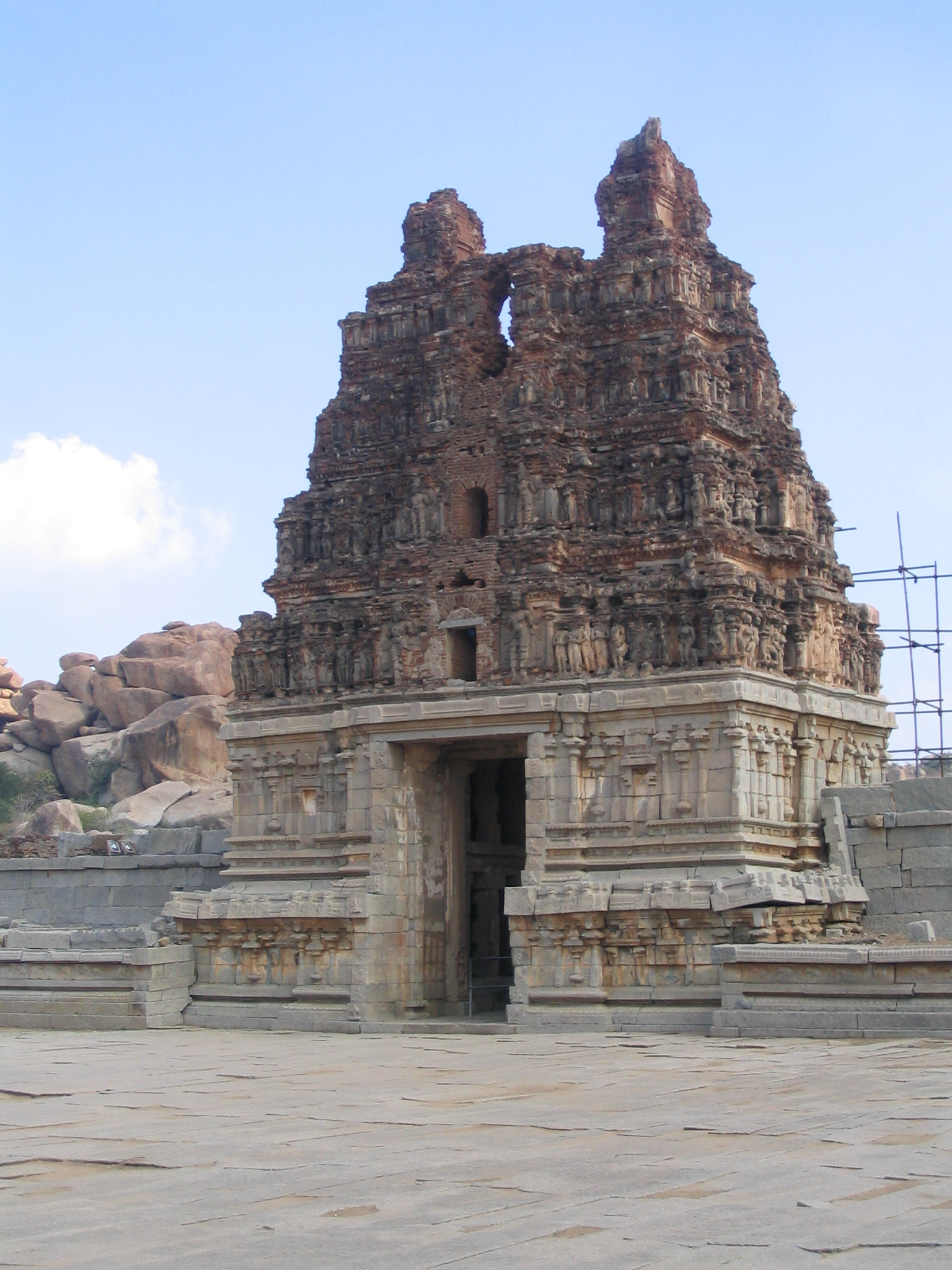
Sri Krishna Temple in Hampi

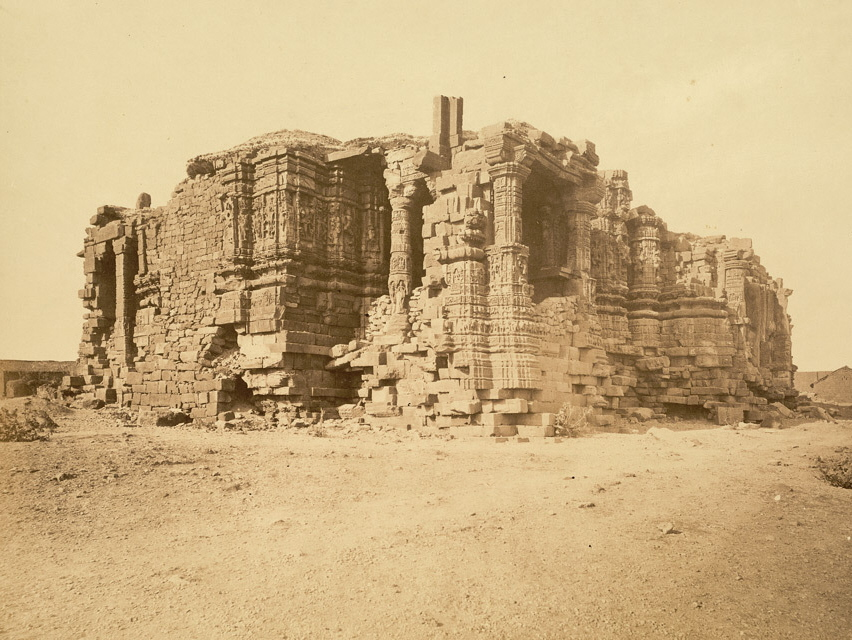
Somnath temple in ruins, 1869

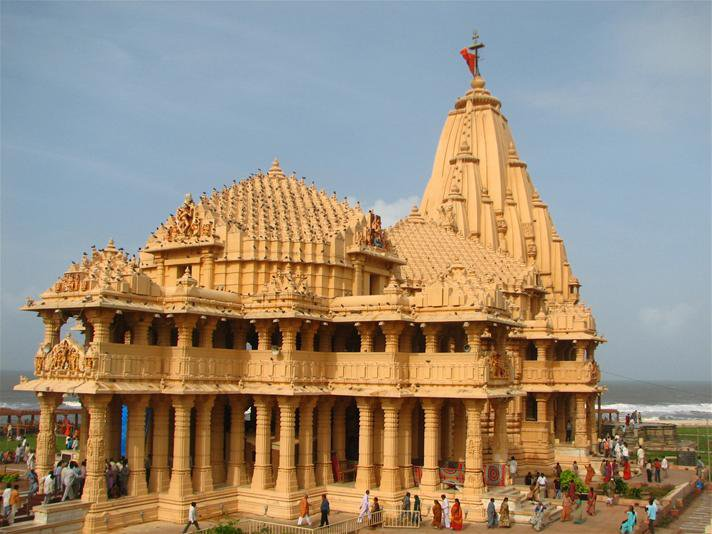
Front view of the present Somnath Temple

The Somnath temple was first attacked by Muslim Turkic invader Mahmud of Ghazni and repeatedly rebuilt after being demolished by successive Muslim rulers.
Iconoclasm during the Muslim conquests on the Indian subcontinent

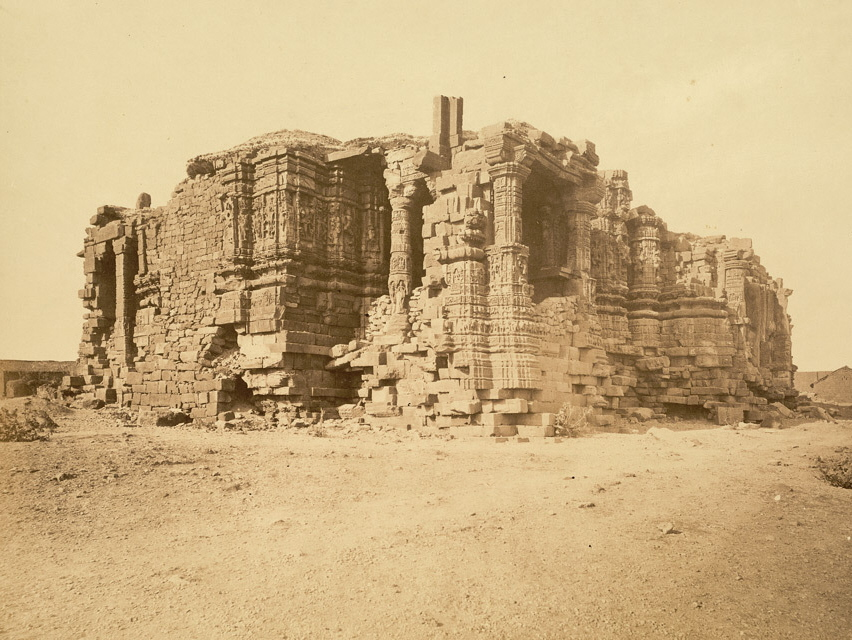
The Somnath temple in Gujarat was repeatedly destroyed by Islamic armies and rebuilt by Hindus. It was destroyed by Delhi Sultanate's army in 1299 CE. The present temple was reconstructed in Chaulukya style of Hindu temple architecture and completed in May 1951.

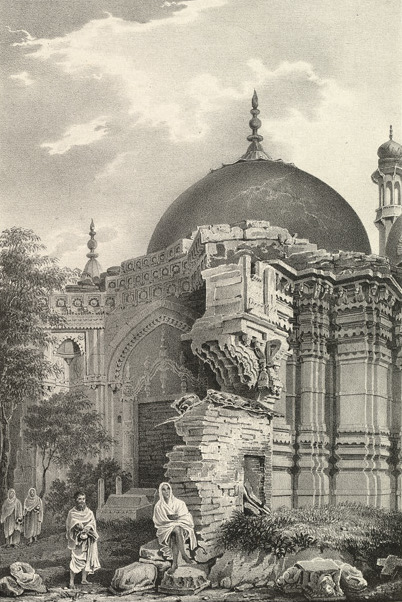
The Kashi Vishwanath Temple was repeatedly destroyed by Islamic invaders such as Qutb ud-Din Aibak.

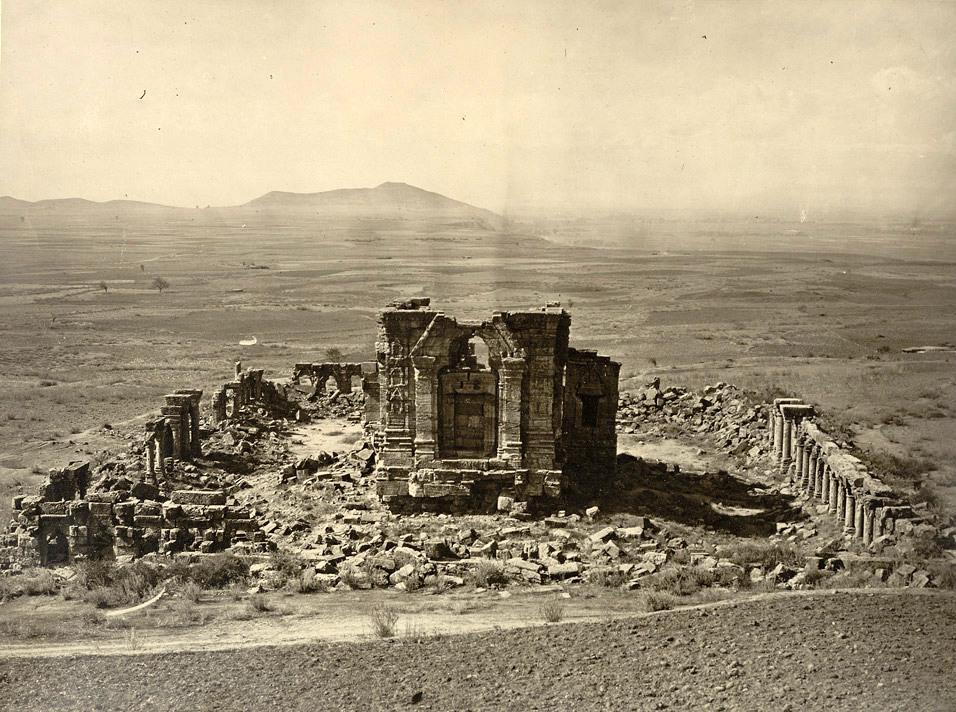
Ruins of the Martand Sun Temple. The temple was destroyed on the orders of Muslim Sultan Sikandar Butshikan in the early 15th century, with demolition lasting a year.

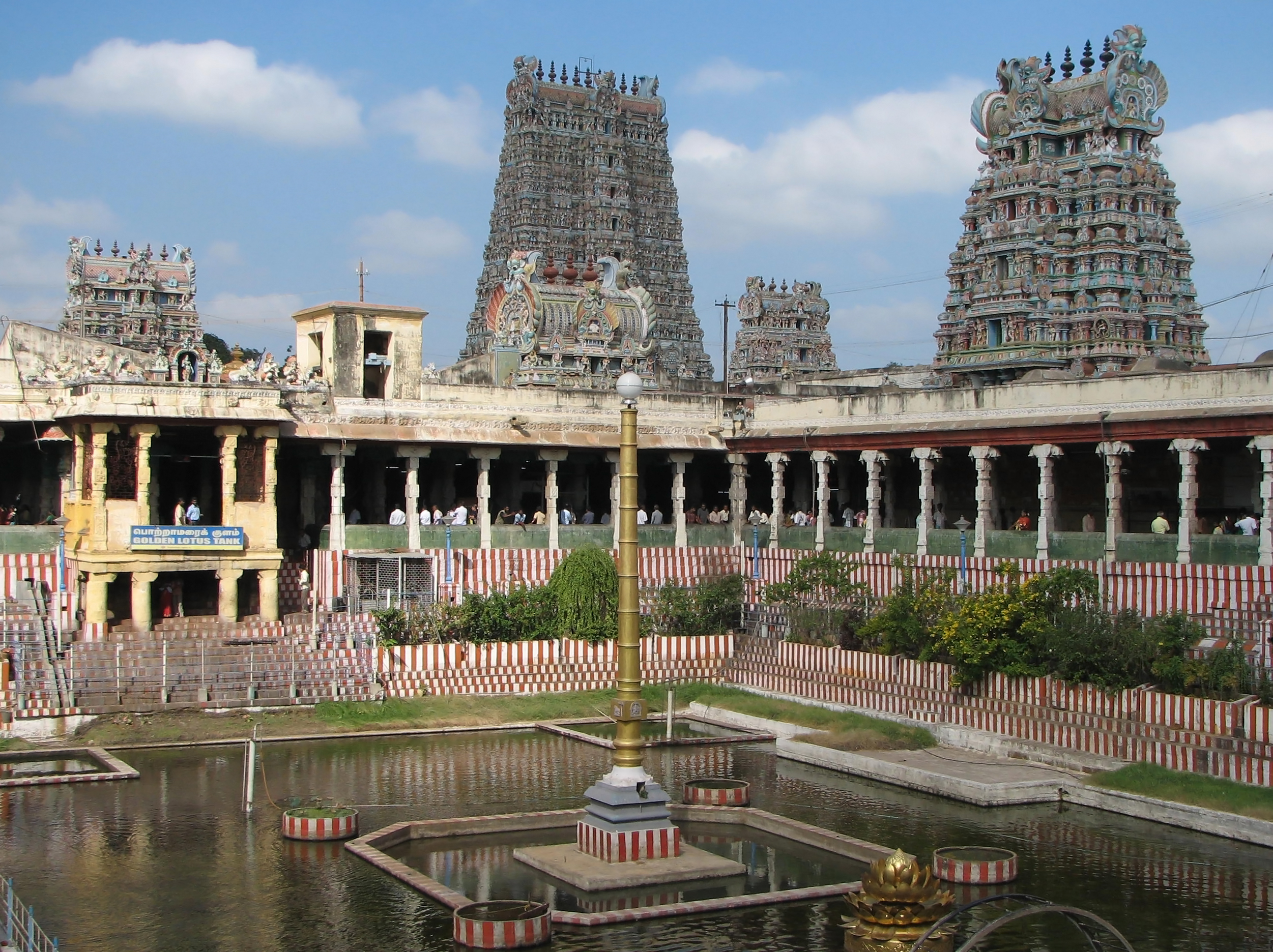
The armies of Delhi Sultanate led by Muslim Commander Malik Kafur plundered the Meenakshi Temple and looted it of its valuables.

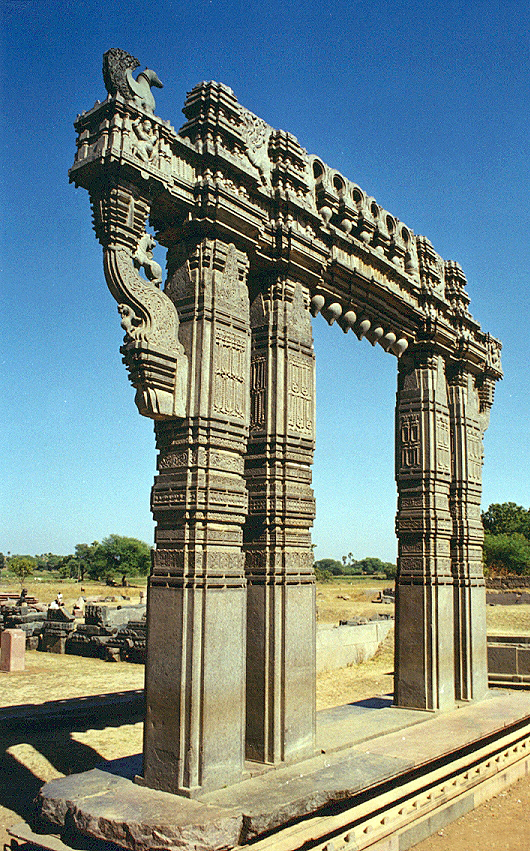
Kakatiya Kala Thoranam (Warangal Gate) built by the Kakatiya dynasty in ruins; one of the many temple complexes destroyed by the Delhi Sultanate.

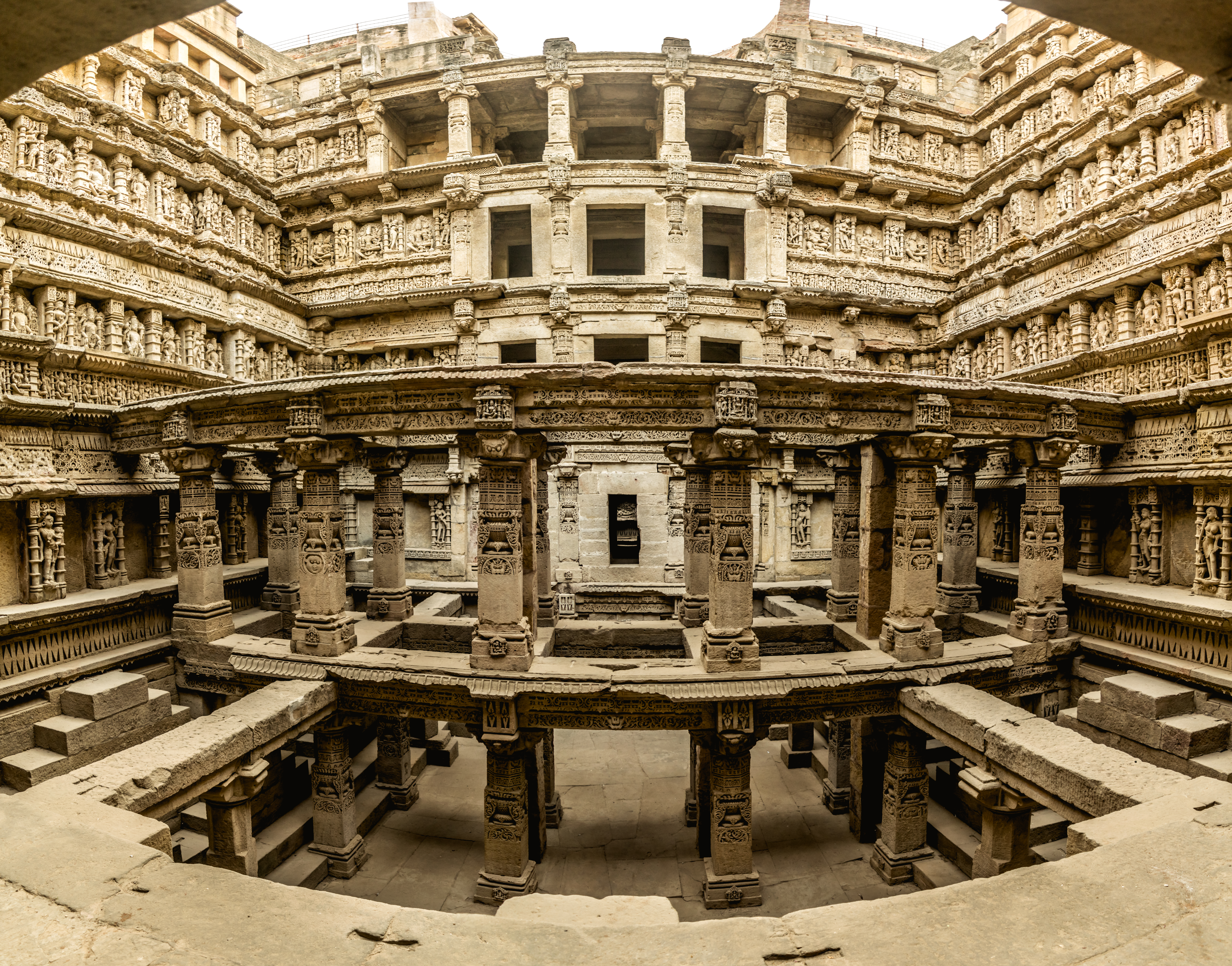
Rani ki vav is a stepwell, built by the Chaulukya dynasty, located in Patan; the city was sacked by Sultan of Delhi Qutb ud-Din Aibak between 1200 and 1210, and it was destroyed by Alauddin Khalji in 1298.

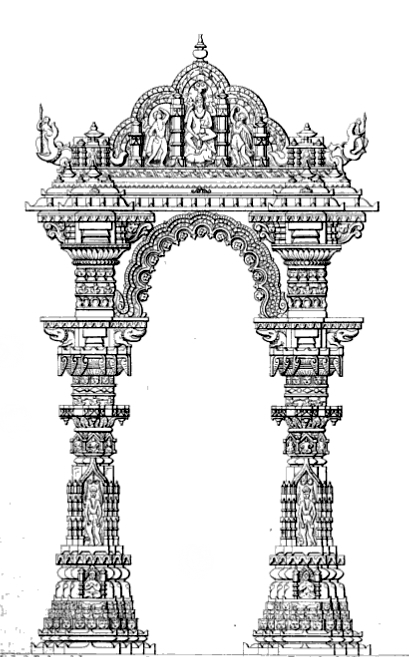
Artistic rendition of the Kirtistambh at Rudra Mahalaya Temple. The temple was destroyed by Alauddin Khalji.

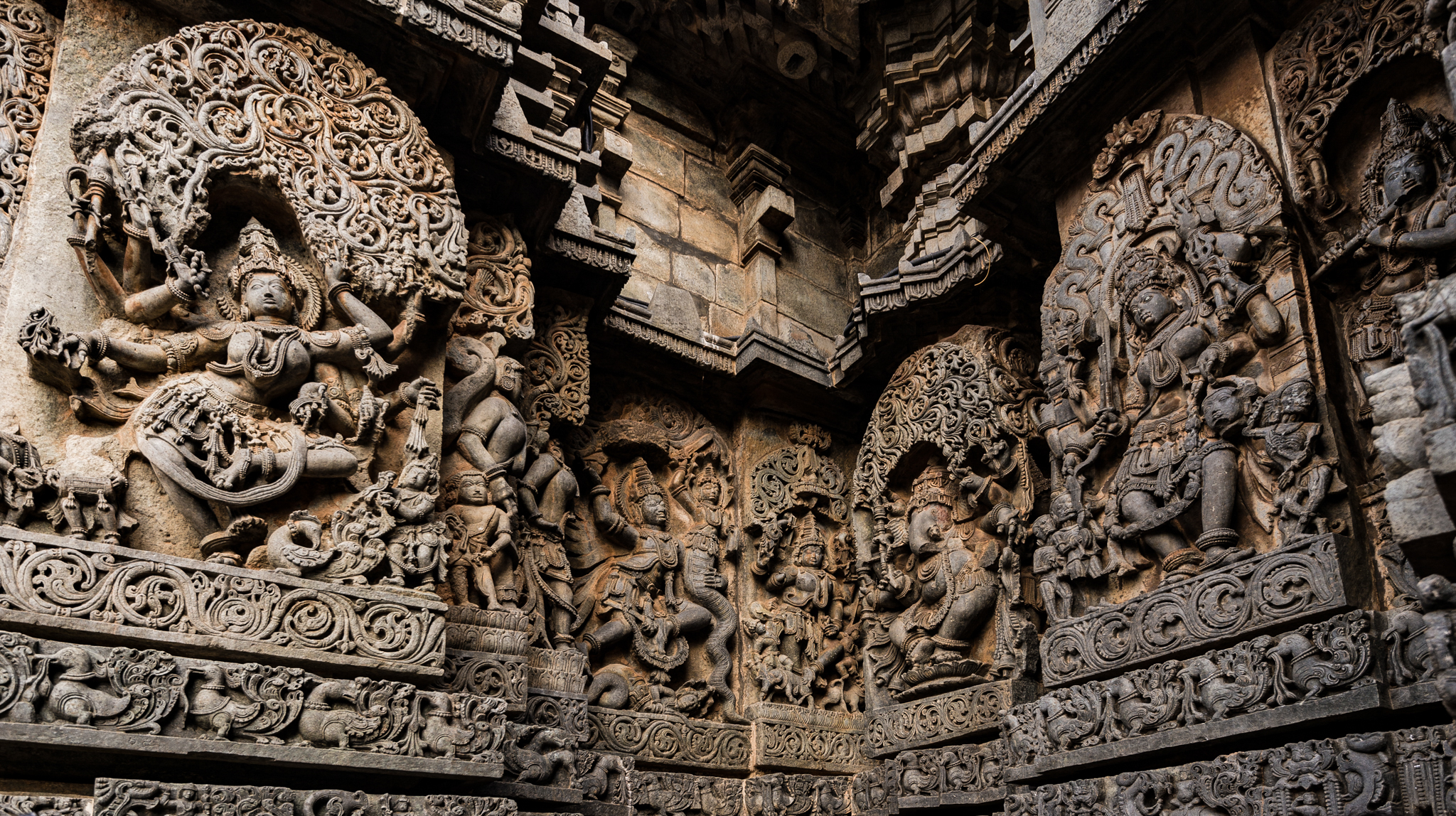
Exterior wall reliefs at Hoysaleswara Temple. The temple was twice sacked and plundered by the Delhi Sultanate.

== See also ==
- Islam in South Asia
- Outline of South Asian history
- History of Afghanistan
- History of India
- History of Pakistan
- History of Bangladesh
- History of Islam
- Spread of Islam
- Islam and other religions
- Islam in Asia
- Muslim kingdoms in the Indian subcontinent
- Ghazwa-e-Hind
- List of early Hindu–Muslim military conflicts in the Indian subcontinent
- Muslim conquests of Afghanistan
- Decline of Buddhism in the Indian subcontinent
- Mughal–Maratha Wars (1680–1707)
- Ahom–Mughal conflicts (1615–1682)
- Aniconism
- Aniconism in Islam
- Iconoclasm
- Conversion of non-Islamic places of worship into mosques

== Bibliography ==
- Adamec, Ludwig W. (2011). Historical Dictionary of Afghanistan. Scarecrow Press. ISBN 978-0-8108-7957-7.
- Aggarwal, Patrap (1978). "Caste hierarchy in a Meo village of Rajasthan". In Ahmad, Imtiaz (ed.). Caste and Social Stratification Among Muslims in India. Manohar. ISBN 978-0-8364-0050-2.
- Ahmad, Mohammad Aziz (1939). "The Foundation of Muslim Rule in India. (1206–1290 A.D.)". Proceedings of the Indian History Congress. 3: 832–841. JSTOR 44252438.
- Ahmed, Fouzia Farooq (2016). Muslim Rule in Medieval India: Power and Religion in the Delhi Sultanate. Bloomsbury. ISBN 978-1-78673-082-4.
- Allen, Margaret Prosser (1991). Ornament in Indian Architecture. University of Delaware Press. ISBN 978-0-87413-399-8.
- Anjum, Tanvir (Summer 2007). "The Emergence of Muslim Rule in India: Some Historical Disconnects and Missing Links". Islamic Studies. 46 (2): 217–240. doi:10.52541/isiri.v46i2.4310. JSTOR 20839068.
- Aquil, Raziuddin (2008). "On Islam and Kufr in the Delhi Sultanate". In Datta, Rajat (ed.). Rethinking a Millennium: Perspectives on Indian History from the Eighth to the Eighteenth Century. Aakar Books. ISBN 978-81-89833-36-7.
- Asif, Manan Ahmed (2016). A Book of Conquest. Harvard University Press. ISBN 978-0-674-97243-8.
- Atherton, Cynthia P. (1997). The Sculpture of Early Medieval Rajasthan. Brill. ISBN 978-90-04-10789-2.
- Avari, Burjor (2013). Islamic Civilization in South Asia: A History of Muslim Power and Presence in the Indian Subcontinent. Routledge. ISBN 978-0-415-58061-8.
- al-Balādhurī (1924). The Origins of the Islamic State. Vol. Part II. Translated by Murgotten, Francis Clark. New York: Columbia University. OCLC 6396175.
- Baloch, N. A. (1992). "The Rulers of Sind, Baluchistan and Multan (750-1500)". In Asimov, M.S.; Bosworth, C.E. (eds.). History of Civilizations of Central Asia. Vol. IV.1. UNESCO. pp. 298–301. ISBN 978-92-3-103467-1.
- Baloch, Nabi Bakhsh Khan (1953). "Muhammad ibn al-Qasim: A Study of His Family Background and Personality". Islamic Culture. 1927 (4): 242–271.
- Baloch, Nabi Bakhsh Khan (1946). "The Probable Date of the First Arab Expeditions to India". Islamic Culture. 20 (3): 250–266.
- Bellew, Henry Walter (1880). The Races of Afghanistan: Being a Brief Account of the Principal Nations Inhabiting that Country. Calcutta: Thacker, Spink, and Co.
- Bhandarkar, D. R. (1929). "Indian Studies No. I: Slow Progress of Islam Power in Ancient India". Annals of the Bhandarkar Oriental Research Institute. 10 (1/2): 25–44. JSTOR 41682407.
- Biraben, Jean-Noël (March 2003). "The rising numbers of humankind" (PDF). Populations & Societies (Editorial). No. 394.
- al-Biruni (1888). Alberuni's India. Vol. I. Translated by Sachau, Edward C. London: Trübner & Co.
- Blankinship, Khalid Y. (1994). The End of Jihad State. State University of New York Press. ISBN 0-7914-1827-8.
- Bosworth, Clifford Edmund (1996). The New Islamic Dynasties. Columbia University Press. ISBN 978-0-231-10714-3.
- Bosworth, C. E. (1968). "The Political and Dynastic History of the Iranian World (A.D. 1000–1217)". In Boyle, J. A. (ed.). The Cambridge History of Iran. Vol. 5. Cambridge University Press. ISBN 978-0-521-06936-6.
- Bradnock, Robert; Bradnock, Roma (2000). India Handbook. McGraw-Hill. ISBN 978-0-658-01151-1.
- Branfoot, Crispin (2003). "The Madurai Nayakas and the Skanda Temple at Tirupparankundram". Ars Orientalis. 33: 156–157. JSTOR 4434276.
- Braudel, Fernand (1994). A History of Civilizations. translated by Richard Mayne. Penguin Books/Allen Lane. ISBN 978-0-713-99022-5.
- Brown, James D. (January 1949). "The History of Islam in India". The Muslim World. 39 (1): 11–25. doi:10.1111/j.1478-1913.1949.tb00991.x.
- Browne, Edward G. (1924). A History of Persian Literature in Modern Times (A.D. 1500–1924). Cambridge University Press.
- Chandra, Satish (2007). History of Medieval India:800–1700. Orient Longman. ISBN 978-81-250-3226-7.
- Chandra, Satish (1997). Medieval India: From Sultanat to the Mughals. Vol. 1 (1st ed.). New Delhi: Har-Anand Publications. OCLC 36806798.
- Chandra, Satish (1999). Medieval India: From Sultanat to the Mughals. Vol. 2 (1st ed.). New Delhi: Har-Anand Publications. OCLC 36806798.
- Chatterji, Angana P. (2009). Violent Gods: Hindu Nationalism in India's Present: Narratives from Orissa. Three Essays Collective. ISBN 978-81-88789-45-0.
- Chaurasia, Radhey Shyam (2002). History of Medieval India:From 1000 A.D. to 1707 A.D. New Delhi: Atlantic Publishers & Distributors. ISBN 81-269-0123-3.
- Chaurasia, Radhey Shyam (2004). History of the Marathas. New Delhi: Atlantic Publishers & Distributors. ISBN 978-81-269-0394-8.
- Christensen, Asger (1995). Aiding Afghanistan: The Background and Prospects for Reconstruction in a Fragmented Society. Copenhagen: NIAS Books. ISBN 978-87-87062-44-2.
- Cole, W. Owen; Sambhi, Piara Singh (2005). A Popular Dictionary of Sikhism: Sikh Religion and Philosophy. Taylor & Francis. ISBN 978-1-135-79759-1.
- Copland, Ian; Mabbett, Ian; Roy, Asim; et al. (2012). A history of State and Religion in India. Routledge. ISBN 978-1-138-84465-0.
- Crawford, Peter (2014). The War of The Three Gods: Romans, Persians, and the Rise of Islam. Skyhorse Publishing. ISBN 978-1-62914-512-9.
- Davis, Richard (1993). "Indian Art Objects as Loot". Journal of Asian Studies. 52 (1): 22–48. doi:10.2307/2059143. JSTOR 2059143. S2CID 161593825.
- De Clercq, Eva (September 2010). "On Jaina ApabhraṂśa Praśastis". Acta Orientalia Academiae Scientiarum Hungaricae. 63 (3): 293–284. doi:10.1556/AOrient.63.2010.3.4. JSTOR 23659006.
- Digby, Simon (1975). "Reviews: K. S. Lal: Growth of Muslim population in medieval India (A.D. 1000–1800)". Bulletin of the School of Oriental and African Studies. 38 (1): 176–177. doi:10.1017/S0041977X0004739X. JSTOR 614231. S2CID 161748418.
- Durant, Will (2014) [first published 1935]. The Story of Civilization. Vol. I. New York: Simon and Schuster. ISBN 978-1-4767-7971-3.
- Dutta, Ranjeeta (November–December 2009). "Review of Demolishing Myths or Mosques and Temples? Readings on History and Temple Desecration in Medieval Indi a". Social Scientist. 37 (11/12): 89–92. ISSN 0970-0293. JSTOR 27748619.
- Eaton, Richard M. (2019). India in the Persianate Age: 1000–1765. Penguin Books. ISBN 978-0-520-97423-4.
- Eaton, Richard M. (1993). The Rise of Islam and the Bengal Frontier, 1204–1760. University of California Press.
- Eaton, Richard Maxwell (2015). The Sufis of Bijapur, 1300–1700. Princeton University Press. ISBN 978-1-4008-6815-5.
- Eaton, Richard M. (September 2000). "Temple Desecration and Indo-Muslim States". Journal of Islamic Studies. 11 (3): 283–319. doi:10.1093/jis/11.3.283.
- Eaton, Richard M. (5 January 2001). "Temple Desecration and Indo-Muslim States, Part II" (PDF). Frontline. pp. 70–77. Archived from the original (PDF) on 6 January 2014. Alternative link Archived 21 September 2020 at the Wayback Machine
- Eaton, Richard M. (2004). Temple desecration and Muslim states in medieval India. Gurgaon: Hope India Publications. ISBN 978-81-7871-027-3.
- Eaton, Richard M. (9 December 2000). "Temple desecration in pre-modern India, Part I". Frontline. Vol. 17, no. 25. pp. 62–70. Archived from the original on 11 December 2013. Alternative link Archived 29 December 2020 at the Wayback Machine
- El Hareir, Idris; M'Baye, Ravene, eds. (2011). The Spread of Islam Throughout the World (PDF). The Different Aspects of Islamic Culture. Vol. Three. UNESCO Publishing. ISBN 978-92-3-104153-2.
- Elliot, H. M. (1867). Dowson, John (ed.). The History of India, as Told by Its Own Historians: The Muhammadan Period. Vol. I. London: Trübner & Co.
- Elliot, H. M. (1869). Dowson, John (ed.). The History of India, as Told by Its Own Historians: The Muhammadan Period. Vol. II. London: Trübner and Co.
- Elliot, H. M. (1871). Dowson, John (ed.). The History of India, as Told by Its Own Historians: The Muhammadan Period. Vol. III. London: Trübner and Co.
- Elliot, Henry (1853). Appendix to The Arabs in Sind. Historians of India. Vol. III, Part 1. S. Solomon & Co. p. 9.
- Elliot, Henry Miers; Ed. John Dowson (1990) [First published 1871]. Dowson, John (ed.). The History of India, as Told by Its Own Historians. The Muhammadan Period. New Delhi: Low Price Publications. OCLC 356910.
- Elphinstone, Mountstuart; Cowell, Edward Byles (1866). The History of India: The Hindú and Mahometan Periods (5th ed.). London: John Murray.
- Elst, Koenraad (1995). "The Ayodhya Debate". In Pollet, Gilbert (ed.). Indian Epic Values: Rāmāyaṇa and Its Impact : Proceedings of the 8th International Rāmāyaạ Conference, Leuven, 6–8 July 1991. Peeters Publishers. ISBN 978-90-6831-701-5.
- Eraly, Abraham (2000). Emperors of the Peacock Throne: The Saga of the Great Mughals. Penguin Books. ISBN 978-0-14-100143-2.
- Ernst, Carl W. (1992). Eternal Garden: Mysticism, History, and Politics at a South Asian Sufi Center. SUNY Press. ISBN 978-1-4384-0212-3.
- Fanselow, Frank S. (January 1989). "Muslim society in Tamil Nadu (India): an historical perspective". Journal Institute of Muslim Minority Affairs. 10 (1): 264–289. doi:10.1080/02666958908716118.
- Ferishta, Mahomed Kasim (1829). History of the Rise of the Mahomedan Power in India, till the year A.D. 1612 Volume III. Translated by Briggs, John. London: Longman, Rees, Orme, Brown and Green.
- Franco, Eli; Preisendanz, Karin (2007). Beyond Orientalism: The Work of Wilhelm Halbfass and Its Impact on Indian and Cross-cultural Studies. Motlilal Banarsidass. ISBN 978-81-208-3110-0.
- Friedmann, Yohanan (2006). "ČAČ-NĀMA". In Bearman, P. (ed.). Encyclopaedia of Islam (Second ed.). Brill Academic Publishers. doi:10.1163/1573-3912_islam_sim_8436. ISBN 978-90-04-16121-4.
- Friedmann, Yohanan (1984). Islam in Asia. Vol. 1. Magnes Press, Jerusalem University. ISBN 978-965-223-521-3.
- Friedmann, Yohanan (June 1975). "Medieval Muslim Views of Indian Religions". Journal of the American Oriental Society. 95 (2): 214–217. doi:10.2307/600318. JSTOR 600318.
- Friedmann, Yohanan (1970). "Minor Problems in al-Baladhuri's Account of the Conquest of Sind". Rivista degli studi orientali. 45 (3): 253–260. JSTOR 41880183.
- Gabrieli, Francesco (September–December 1965). "Muḥammad ibn Qāsim ath-Thaqafī and the Arab Conquest of Sind". East and West. 15 (3/4): 281–295. ISSN 0012-8376. JSTOR 29754928.
- Geer, Alexandra van der (2008). Animals in Stone: Indian Mammals Sculptured Through Time. Leiden: Brill. pp. Ixx. ISBN 978-90-04-16819-0.
- Gier, Nicholas F. (May 2006). From Mongols to Mughals: Religious Violence in India 9th-18th Centuries. Pacific Northwest Regional Meeting American Academy of Religion. Gonzaga University. Archived from the original on 8 November 2012.
- Gier, Nicholas F. (2014). The Origins of Religious Violence: An Asian Perspective. Lexington Books. ISBN 978-0-7391-9223-8.
- Glover, William J. (2008). Making Lahore Modern: Constructing and Imagining a Colonial City. University of Minnesota Press. ISBN 978-0-8166-5021-7.
- Gopal, Ram (1994). Hindu culture during and after Muslim rule: survival and subsequent challenges. M.D. Publications. ISBN 81-85880-26-3.
- Granoff, Phyllis (December 1991). "Tales of Broken Limbs and Bleeding Wounds: Responses to Muslim Iconoclasm in Medieval India". East and West. 41 (1/4): 189–203. ISSN 0012-8376. JSTOR 29756976.
- Griffin, Lepel (1905). Ranjit Singh and the Sikh Barrier Between Our Growing Empire and Central Asia. Clarendon Press.
- Gul, Sumeer; Khan, Samina (2008). "Growth and Development of Oriental Libraries in India". Library Philosophy and Practice.
- Habib, Irfan (January 1978). "Economic History of the Delhi Sultanate – An Essay in Interpretation". The Indian Historical Review. IV (2): 287–303.
- Habib, Irfan (1997). "Timur in the Political Tradition and Historiography of Mughal India". Cahiers d'Asie centrale. 3/4: 295–312. JSTOR 44133321.
- Haidar, Navina Najat; Sardar, Marika (2015). Sultans of Deccan India, 1500–1700: Opulence and Fantasy. Metropolitan Museum of Art. ISBN 978-0-300-21110-8. "Deccan sultanates."
- Haig, Wolseley, ed. (1928). The Cambridge History of India. Vol. III. Cambridge University Press.
- Hamilton, Francis (1819). An Account of the Kingdom of Nepal, and the Territories Annexed to this Dominion by the House of Gorkha. A Constable.
- Heathcote, T. A. (1995). The Military in British India: The Development of British Forces in South Asia:1600–1947. Manchester University Press. ISBN 978-1-78383-064-0.
- Hitchcock, John T. (1978). "An Additional Perspective on the Nepali Caste System". In James F. Fisher (ed.). Himalayan Anthropology: The Indo-Tibetan Interface. Walter de Gruyter. ISBN 978-90-279-7700-7.
- Hitti, Philip K. (1994). History of The Arabs 10th Edition. The MacMillan Press Ltd. ISBN 0-333-09871-4.
- Hitti, Philip K. (2002). History of the Arabs: From the Earliest Times to the Present (10th ed.). Palgrave Macmillan. ISBN 978-0-333-63142-3.
- Hoyland, Robert G. (2015). In God's Path: The Arab Conquests and the Creation of An Islamic Empire. Oxford University Press. ISBN 978-0-19-991636-8.
- Ikram, S. M. (1964). Embree, Ainslie (ed.). Muslim Civilization in India. Vol. 1. Columbia University Press. OCLC 409401 – via Frances W. Pritchett.
- Ishaq, Mohammad (1945). "A Peep Into the First Arab Expeditions to India under the Companions of the Prophet". Islamic Culture. 19 (2): 109–114.
- Islam, Riazul (October–December 2002). "Theory and Practice of Jizyah in the Delhi Sultanate (14th Century)". Journal of the Pakistan Historical Society. 50 (4): 11.
- Iyer, S.; Shrivastava, A.; Ticku, R. (23 January 2017). "Holy Wars? Temple desecrations in Medieval India". Cambridge-INET Institute. doi:10.17863/cam.7847.
- Jackson, Peter (2003). The Delhi Sultanate: A Political and Military History. Cambridge University Press. ISBN 978-0-521-54329-3.
- Jaffrelot, Christophe (1996). The Hindu Nationalist Movement and Indian Politics: 1925 to the 1990s. C. Hurst & Co. Publishers. ISBN 1-85065-170-1.
- Jaques, Tony (2007). "Shupiyan | 1819 | Afghan-Sikh Wars". Dictionary of Battles and Sieges. Vol. 3. Greenwood Press. pp. 938–939. ISBN 978-0-313-33539-6.
- Johnson, Noel D.; Koyama, Mark (2019). Persecution & Toleration: The Long Road to Religious Freedom. Cambridge University Press. ISBN 978-1-108-42502-5.
- Kaw, M. K., ed. (2004). Kashmir and Its People: Studies in the Evolution of Kashmiri Society. A.P.H. Publishing Corporation. ISBN 978-81-7648-537-1.
- Kennedy, Hugh (2001). The Armies of The Caliphs. Routledge. ISBN 0-415-25092-7.
- Kennedy, Hugh (2007). The Great Arab Conquests. Phoenix. ISBN 978-0-7538-2389-7.
- Kennedy, Hugh (2004). The Prophet and The Age of The Caliphates. Pearson Education Limited. ISBN 978-0-582-40525-7.
- Khan, A. D. (2021). A History of the Sadarat in Medieval India. Vol. I. K.K. Publications.
- Khan, Rana Muhammad Sarvar (2005). The Rajputs: History, Clans, Culture, and Nobility. Vol. 1. Canal View Housing Society. OCLC 225243214.
- Khushalani, Gobind (2006). Chachnama Retold: An Account of the Arab Conquests of Sindh. Promilla & Co. ISBN 81-85002-68-1.
- Kulke, Hermann; Rothermund, Dietmar (2004) [First published 1986]. A History of India (4th ed.). Routledge. ISBN 978-0-415-32919-4.
- Lal, K. S. (1990). Indian Muslims: Who are They?. New Delhi: Voice of India. ISBN 978-81-85990-10-1.
- Lal, Kishori Saran (1999). Theory and Practice of Muslim State in India. Aditya Prakashan. ISBN 978-81-86471-72-2.
- Latif, Shaikh Abdul (1993). "The Indian Elements in the Bureaucracy of the Delhi Sultanate". Proceedings of the Indian History Congress. 54: 158–162. JSTOR 44142942.
- Lorenzen, David N. (October 1999). "Who Invented Hinduism?". Comparative Studies in Society and History. 41 (4): 630–659. doi:10.1017/S0010417599003084. JSTOR 179424. S2CID 247327484.
- Lycett, Mark T.; Morrison, Kathleen D. (2013). "The "Fall" of Vijayanagara Reconsidered: Political Destruction and Historical Construction in South Indian History". Journal of the Economic and Social History of the Orient. 56 (3): 433–470. doi:10.1163/15685209-12341314. ISSN 0022-4995. JSTOR 43303558.
- Maclean, Derryl N. (1989). Religion and Society in Arab Sind. Leiden: Brill. ISBN 978-90-04-08551-0.
- Maddison, Angus (2007). The Contours of the World Economy, 1–2030 AD. Oxford University Press. ISBN 978-0-19-922721-1.
- Maddison, Angus (2001). The World Economy: A Millennial Perspective (PDF). OECD Development Centre. ISBN 92-64-02261-9.
- Majumdar, R. C. (1977). Ancient India (Eighth ed.). Delhi: Motilal Banarsidass. ISBN 978-81-208-0436-4.
- Majumdar, R. C., ed. (1980) [First published 1960]. The Delhi Sultanate. The History and Culture of the Indian People. Vol. VI (3rd ed.). Bombay: Bharatiya Vidya Bhavan. OCLC 664485.
- Majumdar, R. C., ed. (1973). The History and Culture of the Indian People. Vol. VII. Mumbai: G. Allen & Unwin. OCLC 664485.
- Malešević, Siniša (2017). The Rise of Organised Brutality. Cambridge University Press. ISBN 978-1-107-09562-5.
- Malik, Jamal (2008). Islam in South Asia: A Short History. Brill Publishers. ISBN 978-90-04-16859-6.
- Manz, Beatrice F. (2006). "Tīmūr Lang". Encyclopaedia of Islam (2nd ed.). Brill. doi:10.1163/1573-3912_islam_COM_1223.
- Marshman, John Clark (2010) [First published 1869]. History of India from the Earliest Period to the Close of the East India Company's Government. Cambridge University Press. ISBN 978-1-108-02104-3.
- McLeod, John (2002). The History of India. Greenwood Press "Daily life through history" series. Greenwood Press. ISBN 978-0-313-31459-9.
- Mehta, Jaswant Lal (1979). Advanced Study in The History of Medieval India. Vol. I (1st ed.). Sterling Publishers. OCLC 557595150.
- Mehta, Jaswant Lal (1986). Advanced Study in the History of Medieval India. Vol. 1 (2nd ed.). Sterling Publishers Pvt. ISBN 978-81-207-0617-0.
- Mehta, Jaswant Lal (2005). Advanced Study in the History of Modern India, 1707–1813. New Dawn Press. ISBN 1-932705-54-6.
- Meston, James, ed. (1934). Hutchison's Story of the Nations. London: Hutchison & Co.
- Mikaberidze, Alexander, ed. (2011). Conflict and Conquest in the Islamic World: A Historical Encyclopedia. ABC-Clio. ISBN 978-1-59884-336-1.
- Miller, Sam (2014). A Strange Kind of Paradise: India Through Foreign Eyes. Random House. ISBN 978-14-4819-220-5.
- Misra, Ram Gopal (1983). Indian Resistance to Early Muslim Invaders, up to 1206 A.D. Meerut City: Anu Books. OCLC 11866350.
- Morony, Michael G. (2012). "Iran in the Early Islamic Period". In Daryaee, Touraj (ed.). The Oxford Handbook of Iranian History. Oxford University Press. ISBN 978-0-19-939042-7.
- Murphy, Emon (2013). The Making of Terrorism in Pakistan: Historical and Social Roots of Extremism. Routledge. ISBN 978-0-415-56526-4.
- Ollapally, Deepa M. (2008). The Politics of Extremism in South Asia. Cambridge University Press. ISBN 978-0-521-87584-4.
- Pandey, Ram Niwas (1997). Making of Modern Nepal: A Study of History, Art, and Culture of the Principalities of Western Nepal. Nirala Publications. ISBN 978-81-85693-37-8.
- Pradhan, Kumar L. (2012). Thapa Politics in Nepal: With Special Reference to Bhim Sen Thapa, 1806–1839. New Delhi: Concept Publishing Company. ISBN 978-81-8069-813-2.
- Puri, Baij Nath (1986). The History of the Gurjara-Pratiharas. Delhi: Munshiram Manoharlal. OCLC 15164632.
- Rahman, Abdur (2002). India's Interaction with China, Central and West Asia. History of Science, Philosophy and Culture in Indian Civilization. Vol. 3, 2. New Delhi: Oxford University Press. ISBN 978-0-19-565789-0.
- Rathod, N. G. (1994). The Great Maratha Mahadaji Scindia. New Delhi: Sarup & Sons. p. 8. ISBN 978-81-85431-52-9.
- Ray, Aniruddha (2019). The Sultanate of Delhi (1206–1526): Polity, Economy, Society and Culture. Routledge. ISBN 978-1-000-00729-9.
- Rāya, Panchānana (1939). A Historical Review of Hindu India: 300 B. C. to 1200 A. D. I. M. H. Press. OCLC 551490926.
- Regmi, D.R. (1961). Modern Nepal. Calcutta: Firma K.L. Mukhopadhyay. OCLC 1045947445.
- Rezavi, S. A. N. (2006). "The Shia Muslims". In Grewal, J. S. (ed.). Religious movements and institutions in Medieval India. History of Science, Philosophy and Culture in Indian Civilization. Vol. 7, Part 2. New Delhi: Oxford University Press. ISBN 978-0-19-567703-4.
- Rizvi, S. A. A. (1986). A Socio-Intellectual History of Isna Ashari Shi'is in India. Canberra: Mar'ifat Publishing House. OCLC 1071565873.
- Sanyal, Sanjeev (2012). Land of Seven Rivers: History of India's Geography. Penguin Books Limited. ISBN 978-81-8475-671-5.
- Sarkar, Jadunath (1988) [First published 1950]. Fall of the Mughal Empire: 1789-1803. Vol. 4. Sangam. ISBN 978-0-86131-749-3.
- Sarkar, Jadunath (1928) [First published 1912]. History of Aurangzeb. Vol. 3 (3rd ed.). M. C. Sarkar and Sons.
- Schimmel, Annemarie (1975). Classical Urdu Literature from the Beginning to Iqbāl. Wiesbaden: Otto Harrasowitz. ISBN 978-3-447-01671-1.
- Schimmel, Annemarie (1980). Islam in the Indian Subcontinent. Leiden: E.J. Brill. ISBN 978-90-04-06117-0.
- Sen, Sailendra Nath (1999). Ancient Indian History and Civilisation (Second ed.). New Delhi: New Age International Publishers. ISBN 978-81-224-1198-0.
- Sen, Sailendra (2013). A Textbook of Medieval Indian History. Primus Books. ISBN 978-9-38060-734-4.
- Sewell, Robert (1884). Lists of Inscriptions, and Sketch of the Dynasties of Southern India. Archaeological Survey of India. OCLC 85167633.
- Shokoohy, Mehrdad (April 1991). "Architecture of the Sultanate of Ma'bar in Madura, and Other Muslim Monuments in South India". Journal of the Royal Asiatic Society. Third Series. 1 (1): 31–92. doi:10.1017/S1356186300000055. JSTOR 25182270. S2CID 163145743.
- Siddiqi, Yasin Mazhar (February 1996). "Hindus in the Administrative Apparatus of the Delhi Sultanate". Islam and the Modern Age. 27 (1): 17–28.
- Siddiqi, Yasin Mazhar (1971). "The Office of Kotwal under the Sultans of Delhi". Proceedings of the Indian History Congress. 33: 189–195. JSTOR 44145331.
- Sikand, Yoginder Singh (Summer 2004). "Caste in Indian Muslim Society". The Asianists' ASIA. III. ISSN 1298-0358. Archived from the original on 17 January 2012.
- Smith, Vincent A. (1919). The Oxford History of India. Oxford University Press. OCLC 839048936.
- Srivastava, A. L. (1966) [First published 1950]. The Sultanate of Delhi (5th ed.). Agra: Shiva Lal Agarwal & Company.
- Thakur, Upendra (1959). Sindhi Culture. University of Bombay. OCLC 3621318.
- Truschke, Audrey (2017). Aurangzeb: The Life and Legacy of India's Most Controversial King. Stanford University Press. ISBN 978-1-5036-0257-1.
- Tucker, Spencer C., ed. (2010). A Global Chronology of Conflict: From the Ancient World to the Modern Middle East. Santa Barbara, Calif.: ABC-CLIO. ISBN 978-1-85109-667-1.
- van der Veer, Peter (1994). Religious Nationalism: Hindus and Muslims in India. University of California Press. ISBN 978-0-520-08256-4.
- Welch, Anthony (1993). "Architectural Patronage and the Past: The Tughluq Sultans of India". Muqarnas. 10: 311–322. doi:10.2307/1523196. JSTOR 1523196.
- Welch, Anthony; Crane, Howard (1983). "The Tughluqs: Master Builders of the Delhi Sultanate" (PDF). Muqarnas. 1: 123–166. doi:10.2307/1523075. JSTOR 1523075. Archived from the original (PDF) on 13 August 2016.
- Whelpton, John (2005). A History of Nepal. Cambridge University Press. ISBN 0-521-80470-1.
- White, Matthew (2011). Atrocitology: Humanity's 100 Deadliest Achievements. Canongate Books. ISBN 978-0-85786-125-2.
- Wink, André (2002) [First published 1990]. Al-Hind, the Making of the Indo-Islamic World. Vol. II (3rd ed.). Brill Academic Publishers. ISBN 0-391-04174-6.
- Wink, André (2002) [First published 1990]. Al-Hind, the Making of the Indo-Islamic World. Vol. I (3rd ed.). Brill Academic Publishers. ISBN 0-391-04173-8.
- Wink, André (2004) [First published 1990]. Al-Hind, the Making of the Indo-Islamic World. Vol. III (3rd ed.). Brill. ISBN 90-04-13561-8.
- Wright, Daniel (1877). History of Nepal. Cambridge University Press.
- Yagnik, Achyut; Sheth, Suchitra (2005). The Shaping of Modern Gujarat: Plurality, Hindutva, and Beyond. Penguin Books India. ISBN 978-0-14-400038-8.
- This article incorporates text from this source, which is in the public domain. Country Studies. Federal Research Division. – India Archived 9 December 2022 at the Wayback Machine, Pakistan Archived 9 December 2022 at the Wayback Machine
