= Indus (disambiguation) =

The Indus River is a river that flows in India, Pakistan and Tibet.

Indus may also refer to:

== Businesses and organizations ==
=== Aviation ===
- Air Indus, a defunct Pakistani airline
- Indus Air, a defunct Indian airline
- Indus Airways, a domestic air carrier based in Delhi, India
- IndUS Aviation, a Texas-based manufacturer of light sport aircraft

=== Media ===
- Indus Creed, Indian rock band, formerly known as Rock Machine

=== Other fields ===
- Indus Health Plus, an Indian health care provider
- Indus Hospital and Health Network, a tertiary care multidisciplinary hospital and healthcare system in Pakistan
- Indus Refinery Project, defunct proposal for a petroleum refinery near Karachi, Pakistan
- Indus Towers, an Indian telecommunications company
- Indus Trust, a non-profit educational trust that focuses on training research and allied activities for underprivileged communities in India
- Toyota Indus, an automobile manufacturer based in Karachi, Pakistan

== People ==
- Julius Indus, a 1st century nobleman of the Gaulish Treveri tribe and ally of the Romans
- Indus Arthur (1941–1984), American actress
- James Indus Farley, a three-term member of the United States Congress from Indiana

== Places ==
- Indus, Alberta, Canada, a hamlet
- Indas or Indus, a town in Bankura, West Bengal, India
- Indus (community development block), an administrative division in Bankura, West Bengal, India
- Indus, Minnesota, United States, an unincorporated community
- Indus Vallis, area on Mars

== Rivers ==
- Dalaman River, Turkey, known as Indus in classical antiquity
- Indus River (Hong Kong) or Ng Tung River

== Schools ==
- Indus University, Pakistan
- Indus Valley School of Art and Architecture, a not-for-profit, degree-awarding institution in Karachi, Sindh, Pakistan

== Ships ==
- HMS Indus, various Royal Navy ships and two shore establishments
- HMIS Indus (U67), a Grimsby-class sloop of the Royal Indian Navy launched in 1934 and sunk during the Second World War in 1942
- USS Indus (AKN-1), a converted Liberty ship in service in World War II, lead ship of the Indus-class net cargo ships
- SS Indus, a number of steamships with this name
- Indus (ship), various ships

== Other uses ==
- Indus (constellation), a southern constellation
- Indus Highway, a national highway in Pakistan
- Battle of the Indus, a 1221 victory for Genghis Khan over Shah Jalal al-Din Mangburni of the Khwarazmian Empire
- Indus script, an ancient script of the Indus Valley Civilization
- 1st Indus Drama Awards, presented in Karachi, Pakistan, in 2005
- Indus, a song by Dead Can Dance from Spiritchaser
- Indus, a model of locomotive - see Yorkshire Engine Company Taurus and Indus

== See also ==
- Sindhu (disambiguation)
- Hindu (disambiguation)
- Indian (disambiguation)
- India (disambiguation)
- Indus 2, a synchrotron radiation source
- Indus Valley Civilisation, an ancient civilization that grew from the Indus River valley
  - Indus script, an undeciphered script of the Indus Valley Civilization
