= Sindi =

Sindi or al-Sindi may refer to:

- Sindi people, an ancient people of the Taman Peninsula, nowadays Russia
- Sindi, Estonia, a town in Pärnu County, Estonia
- Sindi, Maharashtra, a town and municipal council in Wardha District, Maharashtra, India

== People with the surname ==
- Abdulbasit Hindi (born 1997), Saudi Arabian professional footballer
- Ali Sindi Iraqi politician
- Abu Ma'shar al-Sindi, 8th-century Sindhi Muslim scholar of hadith
- Fawziyya al-Sindi (born 1957), Bahraini poet and activist
- Hayat Sindi (1932–2017), Saudi Arabian medical scientist
- Kamil Sindi (born 1932), Saudi businessman and politician
- Karoj Sindi (born 1989), Iraqi footballer
- Muhammad 'Abid al-Sindi (1776–1841), Hanafi jurist and hadith expert
- Muhammad Hayat al-Sindi (died 1750), Islamic scholar and Sufi
- Mohamed Al-Sindi Yemeni lawyer and diplomat
- Rena Kirdar Sindi (born 1969), Iraqi author, socialite and party hostess
- Suzanne Sindi, American mathematical biologist

== People with the given name ==
- Al-Sindi ibn Shahak (died 819), Abbasid general and administrator
- Sindi Dlathu (born 1974), a South African actress
- Sindi Hawkins (born 1958), a Canadian politician
- Sindi Watts, a fictional character from the Australian soap opera Neighbours, played by Marisa Warrington
- Sindi Simtowe, Malawian netball player
- Sindisiwe van Zyl (1976–2021), a South African physician

== See also ==
- Sindhi (disambiguation)
- Sindi, dental software
- Cindy (disambiguation)
- Sinti, a Romani people of Central Europe
