= Sidhu (disambiguation) =

Sidhu may refer to:

- Sidhu, a Jat clan found in India and Pakistan
- Navjot Singh Sidhu, Indian politician
- Jaswinder Kaur Sidhu, an Indo-Canadian beautician who was murdered in an honor killing
- Sidhu Kanhu, the leader of the Santhal rebellion (1855–1856)
- Sidhu Mutsadi, a village in Jalandhar district of Punjab State, India
- Sidhu Moose Wala, an Indian singer, lyricist, and politician
- Sidhu (musician), an Indian singer
- Sidhesh "Sidhu" Sharma, a fictional character in the 2009 Indian film Chandni Chowk to China, portrayed by Akshay Kumar

== See also ==
- Sindhu (disambiguation)
- Sandhu, a Jat clan in India
- Sidhuwal, village in Punjab, India
