= Indus (ship) =

Several sailing vessels have been named Indus, after the Indus River, or the constellation Indus:

- Indus, of 140 tons (bm), was launched in 1776 by the Bombay Dockyard as a pilot boat for the Bengal Pilot Service, and later renamed Industry. The French captured her in 1782.
- Indus, of 1,150 tons, was an East Indiaman launched in 1789 in Amsterdam for the Amsterdam Chamber of the Dutch East India Company. She sailed to Batavia, Dutch East Indies, in 1790 and burned in the Batavia Roads in 1794.
- Indus was launched at Calcutta in 1792 and was lost with all hands that year in the Indian Ocean, while carrying rice from Bengal to Great Britain.
- Indus (1803 ship) was launched in 1803 at Newcastle-upon-Tyne. In 1804 the British East India Company (EIC) hired her for six voyages to India as an "extra ship". She completed the last of these six voyages in 1814. Thereafter she continued to trade with India, but privately, sailing under a licence from the EIC. She was last listed in 1823.
- Indus (1813 ship) was launched at Newcastle-upon-Tyne. She initially traded as a West Indiaman. In 1820–1821 she probably made one voyage carrying cargo from Batavia, Dutch East Indies, to Hamburg and Antwerp. After the probable voyage to Batavia Indus traded between Liverpool and Canada. The cargo that Indus carried from Canada back to Liverpool consisted mainly of lumber, including staves. Her surviving crew members abandoned Indus on 8 January 1839 after she became waterlogged.
- Indus (1817 ship) was launched in Newburyport, Massachusetts in 1817. She first appeared in the British registries in 1823. Throughout her career she remained owned in the United States, and possibly sailing under the United States flag. She may have briefly traded between Great Britain and Batavia, Dutch East Indies, sailing under a licence from the EIC. Thereafter, she sailed between Liverpool and New York. She was probably wrecked 24 September 1829; she was last listed in 1833.
- Indus was a 425-ton sailing ship chartered by the New Zealand Company in 1842.

== Steamships ==
- SS Indus, any one of a number of steam ships named Indus

== See also ==
- HMS Indus, any one of five ships and two establishments of the Royal Navy, and one ship of the Royal Indian Navy
- USS Indus was the lead ship of the Indus class of converted Liberty ships
