= The Hindu (disambiguation) =

The Hindu is an English-language, Indian newspaper.

The Hindu(s) may also refer to :

- The Hindu (Tamil), newspaper in the Tamil language
- The Hindu Group, publisher of both newspapers
  - The Hindu Literary Prize, a literary award
- Hindus, adherents of Hindu religion or culture
- The Hindus: An Alternative History, a 2009 work of historiography

== See also ==
- Hindu (disambiguation)
- Hinduism, a major religion
- Hindoo (disambiguation)
