= List of shipwrecks in November 1829 =

The list of shipwrecks in November 1829 includes some ships sunk, wrecked or otherwise lost during November 1829.

== 1 November ==
List of shipwrecks: 1 November 1829
Ship	State	Description
Arffenston	Sweden	The ship was wrecked near "Capelsham". She was on a voyage from Gothenburg to Stockholm.
John	United Kingdom	The ship ran aground on the Ribble Banks, in the Irish Sea and capsized. She was on a voyage from Liverpool, Lancashire to Londonderry.

== 2 November ==
List of shipwrecks: 2 November 1829
Ship	State	Description
Charlotte	United Kingdom	The ship foundered in the Baltic Sea off Götaland, Sweden. Her crew were rescued.
Liche, Liebe or Lille	(Denmark) Duchy of Holstein	The ship was wrecked on Juist. She was on a voyage from Tönning to Hull, Yorkshire, United Kingdom.
Marchioness of Huntly	United Kingdom	The ship struck an anchor and sank at South Shields, County Durham. She was refloated later that day and beached.
Wallace	United Kingdom	The ship was driven ashore at "Heba", Prussia. She was on a voyage from Saint Petersburg, Russia to London.

== 4 November ==
List of shipwrecks: 4 November 1829
Ship	State	Description
Henry	(United Kingdom of Great Britain and Ireland) British North America	The brig was wrecked in the Chaudière River.
Thoulton	United Kingdom	The ship ran aground on the Barnard Sand, in the North Sea and sank.

== 5 November ==
List of shipwrecks: 5 November 1829
Ship	State	Description
Jane	United Kingdom	The ship was driven ashore on Hiiumaa, Russia. She was on a voyage from Gallipoli, Ottoman Empire to Saint Petersburg, Russia.

== 6 November ==
List of shipwrecks: 6 November 1829
Ship	State	Description
Frau Catharina	(Denmark) Duchy of Saxony	The ship sailed from "Steinhausenseil" for Leith, Lothian, United Kingdom. No further trace, presumed foundered in the North Sea with the loss of all hands.
George Home	United Kingdom	The ship was wrecked near Murray Harbour, Prince Edward Island, British North America. She was on a voyage from Prince Edward Island to Bristol, Gloucestershire.
Gordon Castle	United Kingdom	The ship was driven ashore in the "Bay of Nipisague", British North America, where she was wrecked on 8 November. Her crew were rescued. She was on a voyage from Chaleur Bay to Aberdeen.

== 7 November ==
List of shipwrecks: 7 November 1829
Ship	State	Description
Sir Francis N. Burton	United Kingdom	The ship was driven ashore near "Polagna", Russia with the loss of a crew member. She was on a voyage from Saint Petersburg, Russia to London.

== 8 November ==
List of shipwrecks: 8 November 1829
Ship	State	Description
Cygnet	United States	The schooner was abandoned in the Atlantic Ocean (32°04′N 59°00′W). Her crew were rescued by Alpha (United Kingdom). Cygnet was on a voyage from New York to Baltimore, Maryland.
Rebecca	United Kingdom	The ship was lost at Havana, Cuba. She was on a voyage from Buenos Aires, Argentina to Havana.

== 9 November ==
List of shipwrecks: 9 November 1829
Ship	State	Description
Emilie	Hamburg	The ship was wrecked near "Groststaibo", Sweden. She was on a voyage from Stockholm, Sweden to Hamburg.
Union	United Kingdom	The ship was wrecked on Bornholm, Denmark. Her crew were rescued. She was on a voyage from Riga, Russia to London.

== 10 November ==
List of shipwrecks: 10 November 1829
Ship	State	Description
Caledonia	United Kingdom	The ship was wrecked at Ventava, Courland Governorate.
General Bolivar	Mexico	The ship was wrecked at Veracruz. She was on a voyage from Gibraltar to Veracruz.
John	United Kingdom	The ship was wrecked on Bornholm, Denmark. She was on a voyage from Saint Petersburg, Russian Empire to London.
Promise	(United Kingdom of Great Britain and Ireland) British North America	The brig was wrecked in the River Quelle.

== 11 November ==
List of shipwrecks: 11 November 1829
Ship	State	Description
Diana	United Kingdom	The ship departed from Aberdeen for London. Presumed foundered in the North Sea with the loss of all seven of her crew on 14 or 15 November.
Duke	United Kingdom	The brig was wrecked at Dalkey, County Dublin. Eleven people were rescued by the Kingstown Lifeboat.
Dumbarton Castle	United Kingdom	The paddle steamer sank in the Clyde. She was repaired in 1830 and returned to service.
Elizabeth	United Kingdom	The ship was driven ashore and wrecked at Filey, Yorkshire. Her crew were rescued by the Filey Lifeboat.
Henry Hoyle	United Kingdom	The ship was driven ashore at the mouth of the Arno, Grand Duchy of Tuscany.
Mary and Jane	United Kingdom	The ship was driven ashore and wrecked at Brösen, Prussia. She was on a voyage from Saint Petersburg, Russia to London.

== 12 November ==
List of shipwrecks: 12 November 1829
Ship	State	Description
Arcturus	United Kingdom	The ship ran aground on the Swawer Ort Reef and was consequently beached at Domesnes, Norway. She was on a voyager from Riga, Russia to London.
Britannia	United Kingdom	The ship was wrecked 8 nautical miles (15 km) south of Peterhead, Aberdeenshire. She was on a voyage from Sunderland, County Durham to Fraserburgh, Aberdeenshire.
Leopard	(United Kingdom of Great Britain and Ireland) British North America	The ship capsized in the Atlantic Ocean and was abandoned. Her crew were rescued by Hermitage (United Kingdom). Leopard was on a voyage from Yarmouth, Nova Scotia to Bermuda.
Swan	United Kingdom	The ship was wrecked at near Bullers of Buchan, Aberdeenshire. She was on a voyage from Sunderland to Buckie, Aberdeenshire.

== 13 November ==
List of shipwrecks: 13 November 1829
Ship	State	Description
Providence	United Kingdom	The ship was driven ashore and wrecked at Cullercoats, Northumberland.
Rose	United Kingdom	The ship was wrecked on rocks off Tynemouth, Northumberland. Her crew were rescued.
Sarah	United Kingdom	The ship was driven ashore and wrecked at North Sunderland, County Durham. Her crew were rescued by the Sunderland Lifeboat.

== 14 November ==
List of shipwrecks: 14 November 1829
Ship	State	Description
Almee	United Kingdom	The ship was driven ashore on Götaland, Sweden. She was on a voyage from Saint Petersburg, Russia to London
Bellerophon	United Kingdom	The ship was seen in the Kattegat whilst on a voyage from Pillau, Prussia to Jersey, Channel Islands. No further trace, presumed foundered with the loss of all hands.
Elisabeth	(United Kingdom of Great Britain and Ireland) New South Wales	The brig departed from, Port Dalrymple for Sydney. No further trace, presumed foundered with the loss of all hands.
Karluk	Russian Empire	During a voyage in Russian America from Kodiak to Katmai, the vessel was wrecked in Uganik Bay (57°50′N 153°32′W) on the western coast of Kodiak Island in the Kodiak Archipelago. Her crew survived.

== 16 November ==
List of shipwrecks: 16 November 1829
Ship	State	Description
Colombia	United Kingdom	The ship departed from Pillau, Prussia for Newcastle upon Tyne, Northumberland. Her stern was washed up on Møn, Denmark in late December. Presumed to have foundered with the loss of all hands.
Content	United Kingdom	The brig sprang a leak and was beached at Runswick, Yorkshire. Her crew were rescued. She was on a voyage from Sunderland, County Durham to London.
Industry	United Kingdom	The ship was driven ashore at Eccles-on-Sea, Norfolk. She was on a voyage from Grimsby, Lincolnshire to London.
Themis	Sweden	The ship was wrecked between Hjørring and Thisted, Denmark. Her crew were rescued. She was on a voyage from Newcastle upon Tyne to Karlshamn.

== 17 November ==
List of shipwrecks: 17 November 1829
Ship	State	Description
Collins	United Kingdom	The ship foundered in the North Sea off Cromer, Norfolk. Her crew were rescued. She was on a voyage from South Shields, County Durham to London.
Levant	United Kingdom	The ship was wrecked on the coast of Labrador, British North America. She was on a voyage from Quebec City, Lower Canada, British North America to Kinsale, County Cork.

== 19 November ==
List of shipwrecks: 19 November 1829
Ship	State	Description
Hamilton	United Kingdom	The barque was wrecked on the Craig-my-Cair Rocks, off the coast of Aberdeenshire. All five people on board were rescued. She was on a voyage from Sunderland, County Durham to Peterhead, Aberdeenshire.

== 20 November ==
List of shipwrecks: 20 November 1829
Ship	State	Description
Frederik Wilhelm	Bremen	The ship sprang a leak and was beached on Heligoland. She was on a voyage from Bremen to Leith, Lothian, United Kingdom.
Mary	United Kingdom	The ship was driven ashore at "Ballingan".

== 21 November ==
List of shipwrecks: 21 November 1829
Ship	State	Description
Tarbolton	United Kingdom	The ship was wrecked on the Blockhouse Rock. She was on a voyage from Troon, Ayrshire to Dublin.

== 22 November ==
List of shipwrecks: 22 November 1829
Ship	State	Description
Baron Ardrossan	United Kingdom	The ship struck a sandbank and was consequently beached at Morriscastle, County Wexford. She was on a voyage from Whitehaven, Cumberland to Cardiff, Glamorgan.
Julius	France	The brig collided with Scotia (United Kingdom) and sank off Cowes, Isle of Wight, United Kingdom with the loss of her captain. She was on a voyage from Bilbao, Spain to London, United Kingdom.
Mercury	United Kingdom	The ship was driven ashore and wrecked at Sunderland, County Durham. She was on a voyage from King's Lynn, Norfolk to Sunderland.

== 23 November ==
List of shipwrecks: 23 November 1829
Ship	State	Description
Commerce	United Kingdom	The ship was driven ashore at Bridlington, Yorkshire. She was refloated on 28 November.
Felecia	United States	The ship was wrecked near "Irigny". Her crew were rescued.
Glasgow	United Kingdom	The ship was driven ashore at Faro, Portugal. Her crew were rescued. She was on a voyage from Leith, Lothian to Malta.
Henry	United Kingdom	The full-rigged ship was driven ashore at Gibraltar.
Maria	Portugal	The full-rigged ship was driven ashore at Gibraltar. She had been refloated by 26 November.
Martin	United Kingdom	The ship was driven ashore at Saltfleet, Lincolnshire. Her crew were rescued.
Rose	(United Kingdom of Great Britain and Ireland) Gibraltar	The full-rigged ship was driven ashore at Gibraltar. She had been refloated by 26 November.
Shallot	United Kingdom	The ship ran aground on the Stoney Binks, in the North Sea off the mouth of the Humber and foundered with the loss of twelve of her fourteen crew. She was on a voyage from South Shields, County Durham to Odesa.

== 24 November ==
List of shipwrecks: 24 November 1829
Ship	State	Description
Alexander	United Kingdom	The ship was driven ashore near Grimsby, Lincolnshire. She was on a voyage from London to Sunderland, County Durham.
Amicus	United Kingdom	The ship was driven ashore at Grimsby, Lincolnshire. She was on a voyage from "Hemsworth" to Sunderland.
Ann	United Kingdom	The brig was driven ashore at Pakefield, Suffolk. Her nine crew were rescued by the Lowestoft Lifeboat.
Ann	United Kingdom	The ship was driven ashore on the Holderness coast, Yorkshire.
Bonito	United Kingdom	The ship was driven ashore at Grimsby.
Britannia	United Kingdom	The ship was driven ashore at Great Yarmouth, Norfolk. Her crew were rescued.
Briton	United Kingdom	The ship was driven ashore near Grimsby. She was on a voyage from London to Sunderland.
Dunn	United Kingdom	The ship was driven ashore at Bridlington, Yorkshire. She had been refloated and taken in to Bridlington by 9 December.
Durham	United Kingdom	The ship was driven ashore near Grimsby. She was later refloated.
Elizabeth	United Kingdom	The ship was driven ashore near Grimsby. She was later refloated.
Ellen	United Kingdom	The ship was driven ashore at Bridlington.
Endeavour	United Kingdom	The ship was driven ashore near Grimsby. She was on a voyage from London to South Shields, County Durham.
Flora	United Kingdom	The ship was driven ashore at Great Yarmouth. Her crew were rescued.
Galatea	United Kingdom	The ship was driven ashore at Grimsby. She was refloated on 28 November.
General Palmer	British East India Company	The East Indiaman was driven onto the Goodwin Sands, Kent. She was subsequently beached at Whitstable, Kent. All on board were rescued.
Good Intent	United Kingdom	The ship was driven ashore at Bridlington, East Riding of Yorkshire. She was on a voyage from Portsmouth, Hampshire to Sunderland, County Durham.
Hammond	United Kingdom	The ship was driven ashore and wrecked at Great Yarmouth with the loss of all but two of her crew.
Helen	United Kingdom	The ship was driven ashore at Bridlington.
Helen	United Kingdom	The ship was driven ashore and wrecked at Atwick, Yorkshire.
Hero	United Kingdom	The ship was driven ashore near Grimsby. She was on a voyage from Poole, Dorset to Sunderland.
Hound	United Kingdom	The ship was wrecked on the Sizewell Bank, in the North Sea off the coast of Suffolk with the loss of all ten crew.
Hudson	United Kingdom	The ship was driven ashore at Lowestoft.
Indus	United Kingdom	The ship was wrecked on the Newcombe Sand, in the English Channel off the coast of Sussex with the loss of all hands. She was on a voyage from Liverpool, Lancashire to Bremen.
John and Elizabeth	United Kingdom	The ship was driven ashore at Great Yarmouth. Her crew were rescued.
Junea	United Kingdom	The ship was driven ashore at Grimsby.
Liverpool	United Kingdom	The ship was driven ashore and wrecked at Lowestoft with the loss of a crew member.
Louisa	United Kingdom	The ship was wrecked near Dublin. Her crew were rescued.
Lucy	United Kingdom	The ship was driven ashore at Brancaster, Norfolk.
Manchester	United Kingdom	The steamship was driven ashore near Dublin. She was on a voyage from Dublin to Cork. Manchester was refloated on 26 November but consequently foundered. Her crew were rescued by the steamship Ballinasloe (United Kingdom).
Margaretta	United Kingdom	The ship was driven ashore and wrecked at Lowestoft.
Maria	United Kingdom	The schooner was driven ashore and wrecked at Deal, Kent. Her crew were rescued. She was on a voyage from Sligo to London.
Melantho	United Kingdom	The brig foundered in Bridlington Bay with the loss of all hands. She was on a voyage from Sunderland to London.
Mountaineer	United Kingdom	The brig was driven ashore and wrecked at Deal with the loss of five lives. Survivors were rescued by the Deal and Walmer Lifeboats. She was on a voyage from the Cape of Good Hope to London.
Neptune	United Kingdom	The ship was driven ashore at Lowestoft.
Providence	United Kingdom	The ship was driven ashore at Lowestoft. She was on a voyage from London to Stockton on Tees, County Durham, or Southwold, Suffolk.
Ranger	United Kingdom	The ship was driven ashore at Pakefield, Suffolk. Her crew were rescued.
Robert and Sarah	United Kingdom	The ship foundered in the North Sea off Wells-next-the-Sea, Norfolk with the loss of all hands. She was on a voyage from Sunderland to Wells-next-the-Sea.
Sarah Ann	United Kingdom	The ship was driven ashore at Lowestoft.
Susan	United Kingdom	The ship was driven ashore at Lowestoft.
Sunderland	United Kingdom	The ship was driven ashore and wrecked at Lowestoft.
Thomas and Mary	United Kingdom	The brig was wrecked on the Newcombe Sand, in the North Sea off the coast of Suffolk. Her ten crew were rescued by the Lowestoft lifeboat.
Tiger	United Kingdom	The ship was driven ashore at Lowestoft.
Venus	United Kingdom	The ship was driven ashore at Cleethorpes, Lincolnshire.
Wharfinger	United Kingdom	The ship was driven ashore at Great Yarmouth. Her crew were rescued. She was on a voyage from Arkhangelsk, Russia to Great Yarmouth.
Wesleyan	United Kingdom	The ship was driven ashore near Grimsby. She was on a voyage from Cowes, Isle of Wight to Sunderland.

== 25 November ==
List of shipwrecks: 25 November 1829
Ship	State	Description
Felicia	United States	The ship was wrecked near "Irigny". Her crew were rescued.
Louisa	United Kingdom	The ship was driven ashore and wrecked near Dublin. Her crew survived.
Mary Ellen	United Kingdom	The ship was driven ashore and wrecked at Skipsea, Yorkshire. Her crew were rescued.
Speculant	Stettin	The ship was beached at Stralsund. She was on a voyage from Newcastle upon Tyne, Northumberland, United Kingdom to Stettin.
Sunderland	United Kingdom	The ship was driven ashore and wrecked at Lowestoft, Suffolk.
Trial	United Kingdom	The ship was driven ashore at Belfast, County Antrim.

== 26 November ==
List of shipwrecks: 26 November 1829
Ship	State	Description
Harmony	United Kingdom	The ship was abandoned in the North Sea. Her crew were rescued by Barrick (United Kingdom. Harmony was on a voyage from Memel, Prussia to London.
Twee Gebroeders	Hamburg	The ship was abandoned in the North Sea off Texel, North Holland, Netherlands.

== 27 November ==
List of shipwrecks: 27 November 1829
Ship	State	Description
Childe Harold	United Kingdom	The ship was driven ashore in the River Tay and wrecked with the loss of a crew member. She was on a voyage from Saint Petersburg, Russia to Dundee, Forfarshire.
William Penn	United Kingdom	The barque was sighted off Helsingør, Denmark whilst bound to Sunderland, County Durham. No further trace, presumed foundered with the loss of all hands.

== 28 November ==
List of shipwrecks: 28 November 1829
Ship	State	Description
Carnatic	United Kingdom	The ship was driven ashore in the Humber. She was on a voyage from London to Sunderland, County Durham.

== 29 November ==
List of shipwrecks: 29 November 1829
Ship	State	Description
Mary Elizabeth	United States	The ship was driven ashore at Puntila, Spain with some loss of life. She was on a voyage from New York to Marseille, Bouches-du-Rhône, France.
Pacific	United Kingdom	The ship was wrecked at "Little River Head", British North America. She was on a voyage from Whitehaven, Cumberland to Saint John, New Brunswick, British North America.

== 30 November ==
List of shipwrecks: 30 November 1829
Ship	State	Description
Betsey	United Kingdom	The ship sprang a leak and was beached in the Strangford Lough. She was on a voyage from Dundalk, County Louth to Liverpool, Lancashire.
Planter	United Kingdom	The ship was holed by her anchor and sank at South Shields, County Durham. She was refloated in late December.
St. John	United Kingdom	The ship was driven ashore and wrecked at Wick, Caithness. Her crew were rescued. She was on a voyage from Saint Petersburg, Russia to Liverpool.

== Unknown date ==
List of shipwrecks: Unknown date in November 1829
Ship	State	Description
Better Luck Still	United Kingdom	The ship was abandoned in the North Sea. She was on a voyage from Saint Petersburg, Russia to London.
Diana	United Kingdom	The sloop was wrecked at Berwick upon Tweed, Northumberland with the loss of all six people on board.
Emma	United Kingdom	The ship was driven ashore and wrecked at the mouth of the Guadiana River between 18 and 23 November. She was on a voyage from Livorno, Grand Duchy of Tuscany to London.
Loughhead	United Kingdom	The ship foundered in the Irish Sea off the Isle of Man. She was on a voyage from Belfast, County Antrim to Liverpool, Lancashire.
Providence	(United Kingdom of Great Britain and Ireland) British North America	The brig was driven ashore and wrecked at Levis, Lower Canada.
Reed	United Kingdom	The ship was driven ashore at Bridlington. She was on a voyage from London to Sunderland.
Nancy	United Kingdom	The ship was driven ashore at Skegness, Lincolnshire. She was refloated on 22 November and taken in to Wainfleet, Lincolnshire. Nancy was on a voyage from Kiel, Duchy of Holstein to London
St. Bernard	France	The ship was driven ashore and wrecked at "Fort Barland" between 18 and 23 November. She was on a voyage from Marseille, Bouches-du-Rhône to Martinique.
Victoria	United Kingdom	The ship ran aground on Seal Island, Nova Scotia, British North America and was abandoned by her crew.
William	United Kingdom	The ship was wrecked near Arkhangelsk, Russia.
Woodford	United Kingdom	The ship was wrecked in the Pacific Ocean before 7 November. The wreck was sighted on this day by Surry (United Kingdom). Woodford was on a voyage from Hobart, Van Diemen's Land to the United Kingdom.
Zephyr	United Kingdom	The ship was driven ashore at "Shiphaven". She was on a voyage from Dublin to Galway.
