= Sahadeo Tiwari =

Pt. Sahadeo Tiwari (Trinidadian Hindustani: सहदेव तिवारी) was born in Chhapra in Saran district, Bihar, India on 25 February 1893. He came to Trinidad and Tobago as an indentured labourer in 1912 upon the vessel SS Indus, and later married Sunbass Tiwari (not related). This marriage according to his daughter Kanti, produced two sons: Ramakant and Surrindra and, five daughters: Maianti, Shanti, Savitri, Kanti, and Reanti.

== The Sanatan Dharma Board of Control ==
In January 1932, Tiwari established The Sanatan Dharma Board of Control. The Port of Spain Gazette noted that the principal objective of the organization was to unify Hindus and further the interest of the Hindu religion among the Hindu section of the local community. The Sanatan Dharma Board of Control was based in Tunapuna and as stated by the Port-of-Spain Gazette, was composed of predominantly orthodox, practising pundits who formed part of a Committee of Management that included: Pundit Sahadeo Tiwari (President), Pt. Bhagouti, Pt. Ramnarine, Pt. Dyalchan, Pt. Seereeram, Pt. Sohan, Pt. Seereedath, Pt. Sooknanan and Pt. Gosyne. The organization also had other objectives which were:

(a).To further and assist the education and advancement of the adherents to Sanatana Dharma.

(b).To provide by voluntary subscriptions of its members with the aid of donations:

(1).For the relief or maintenance of members when in distressed circumstances.
(2).For the relief or maintenance of members during sickness or infirmity.
(3).For the payment of the burial and other incidental funeral expenses of any members if needed.
(4).For the giving of a dowry in a suitable case to the daughter of any member who by reason of his or her poverty shall be unable to provide for her marriage.

J.C. Jha noted that the group was formed by pundits and the pundits were critical of the Sanatan Dharma Association, another Hindu organization that had a number of Christians on its board.

== Vivaha Samskara ==
Pundit Tiwari was the first Pundit to perform a Hindu marriage ceremony or Vivaha Samskara in the day despite opposition from other Pundits who even threatened his life. The Hindu marriage ceremony at the time was performed in the night and this resulted in the procession from the boy side or Baraat having to stay overnight. The family of the girl or dulahin had to look after and entertain the Baraatians, a rather costly exercise.

It was because of such economic circumstances that Pundit Sahadeo Tiwari felt it best to perform the marriage ceremony of Francis Jairam Bhopalsingh and Rajoo Narayansingh in the day. The ceremony took place on 23 April 1933 at 11:00 am in Tunapuna at the Old Railway Station. By importing a book from India called the Vivah Paddhati, a Hindu manual on the marriage ceremony, Pundit Tiwari was able to silence his opposition against performing the ceremony during the day. Debate among the elite (Panchayat) was simple. Pundit Kaysho Byragie stressed that a wedding performed in the night meant that the Dhruva Taara (North Star) was shown to the bride and because the star was fixed, it was used to demonstrate to the bride that she should remain fixed in her commitment to her marriage. However, if the ceremony was done in the day, then Surya Darshan or the Sun was shown and it was made clear that the Sun held the same significance of the North Pole Star which was that it is in a fixed position. Thus, Pundit Byragie concluded, the validity of the day wedding was established through the facts put forward by Pundit Sahadeo Tiwari.

Pundit Sahadeo Tiwari died on 14 April 1972. During his life he tutored a number of well known Pundits such as the late Ramcharan Byragie, the late Satnarayan Panday and Pundit Param among others.
