= List of shipwrecks of Cornwall (1881–1890) =

The List of shipwrecks of Cornwall (1881–1890) lists the ships which sank on or near the coasts of mainland Cornwall in that period. The list includes ships that sustained a damaged hull, which were later refloated and repaired.

== 1881 ==
=== January ===
- 4 January – the 200-ton Newcastle steamer Active (United Kingdom) struck the Stag Rocks off Lizard Point while bound for Caen with coal from Neath.
- 17 January – the Porthleven dandy Enterprise (United Kingdom) went ashore on Clodgy Point, St Ives. The crew were taken off by the steamer Gwent before the dandy went ashore.
- 17 January – the schooner Rosa Joseph (France) went ashore at St Ives while taking coal from Briton Ferry to Cherbourg.
- 21 January – 89-ton Penzance schooner British Lady (United Kingdom) lost her mast in a gale and sank near the Runnelstone. Her crew was picked up by the Queen of the Bay.

=== February ===
- 13 February – the Nantes brigantine Sylphide (France) foundered and became a total wreck on the beach at Perranuthnoe while bound from Audierne to Cardiff with a cargo of potatoes. The crew were saved by the Prussia Cove rocket appartatus.
- 13 February – the Searsport, Maine barque T F Whiton (United States), bound for London from Victoria, Vancouver Island with a mixed cargo of oil, tinned fish, wool, etc., foundered at Praa Sands. The crew were saved by the Prussia Cove rocket appartatus and the ship became a total loss after it caught fire. Two local men were fined for stealing some of the ship's cargo; tins of pickled salmon.
- 22 February – the Port Madoe schooner Georgina (United Kingdom) ran ashore on the rocks off Porthoustock. The crew attracted attention by lighting a tar-barrel and the ship and cargo of railway sleepers was destroyed. The crew were rescued by the Porthoustock lifeboat.
- undated – the Rocket Brigade ″shewn alacrity″ last week to reach the scene of the wreck in Hoblyn's Cove, St Agnes.

=== March ===
- 2 March – the Croisec vessel Cecilie Caroline (France) left Charlestown with china clay for Nantes. She was driven ashore, a few hours after she left port, at nearby Apple-tree. The five crew lost their lives.
- 3 March – a brigantine carrying pitwood for Port Talbot went ashore at Mevagissey. Two of the crew drowned. Her cargo was sold for £27 and the hull for £8 10s.

=== April ===
- 9 April – the Guernsey schooner Speed sank after a collision with an unknown steamer off the Longships. Speed was carrying salt from Runcorn to Jersey and the surviving crew were picked up by the Victua and landed at Plymouth.
- 17 April – the 99-ton Padstow schooner Katie (United Kingdom), carrying starch from Norwich to Dublin, struck the Runnelstone and sank with no loss of life.
- 21 April – the crew of the Ellen Vair were taken off and landed in Newport, when she collided with the Gertrude off The Lizard.

=== June ===
- 6 June – the 222-ton steamer Seine (United Kingdom), while in ballast from Plymouth to Neath, sank immediately after being hit by the 1,058-ton steamer Prado off Godrevy Head. Prado landed the crew at Falmouth.

=== July ===
- 3 July – the schooner Glen (United Kingdom) collided with the screw-steamer Alliance off St Ives and foundered. The crew were landed at Penarth on board the alliance.

=== October ===
- 24 October – the schooner Victoria (United Kingdom) was a total wreck in Newlyn harbour during a storm. Onboard was ten tons of coal and fifteen tons of ballast
- 30 October – a hulk with more than 500 tons of coal on board sank in Falmouth harbour.

=== November ===
- 1 November – the Regniville schooner Sophie (France) was wrecked and went to pieces on Battery Point, Prussia Cove with the loss of all the crew.

=== December ===
- 8 December – the barque Malaleel (Austria-Hungary) hit the Shark's Fin, the northernmost rock of the Longships reef and became a total wreck. She was carrying pitwood for the collieries in South Wales from Bordeaux. Wreckage was washed up below the Levant mine and in Portheras Cove.
- 17 December – the Swansea three-masted schooner Constance (United Kingdom) bound for Santander, Spain from Newport, with coal, grounded at the entrance to the Hayle River and became a total wreck. The crew and pilots were taken off by the Hayle lifeboat Isis.

== 1882 ==
February

- 15 February – the steamer Rosebud (United Kingdom) carrying coal from Newport to Lisbon, collided with the Lady Olive 3 miles (4.8 km) south of the Longships. Four crew lost their lives.
- 23 February – the Hamburg brigantine Auguste (German Empire) ran ashore in Whitsand Bay and became a total wreck. All the crew survived.

April

- 29 April – the 89-ton Drumhendry (United Kingdom) was driven ashore in St Ives Bay under Wheal Lucy. The steamer was carrying dynamite from Ireland to Hayle. The crew were hauled ashore on a rope and the captain and mate were picked up by the Hayle lifeboat.

June

- 9 June – 3200-ton emigrant steamer the Mosel (German Empire) of Bremen wrecked underneath the Lloyds Signal Station near Lizard Point in fog. Falmouth tugs took the passengers off and they made their way to Liverpool by train. She also carried a cargo of materials including velvet and it was said these were hidden in every chimney and within every gorse bush in the parish with one black velvet coat still being worn in the village in 1930. It was also said that much of her cargo was salvaged, and was auctioned at Falmouth Docks on 29 August 1882.
- 23 June – the Vic (United Kingdom) no 3 Pilot Cutter based at Falmouth, was run down in the English Channel, by the steamer Rosina about 3 miles (4.8 km) off St Anthony Head. The six crew survived.

October

- 7 October – the Aberystwith schooner Nive (United Kingdom) sprung a leak eight miles south-east of Penzance and foundered while carrying pitch from Plymouth to Swansea. The crew of four landed at Penzance in the ship's boat.

November

- 16 November – the Plymouth smack James and Elizabeth capsized and was driven ashore at Hellsmouth, 1 mile (1.6 km) to the east of Godrevy Head.
- 16 November – when attempting to help the crew of the schooner Susan and Elizabeth which was driven under the Black Cliffs, St Ives Bay in a gale, the lifeboat Isis ( Royal National Lifeboat Institution) capsized. No lives lost from either vessel.
- 16 November – an unnamed brig, disappeared and sank in a couple of minutes off St Ives Head, while attempting a run for one of St Ives beaches.
- 18 November – the 676-ton barque, Condor (Russian Empire) hit the Vorses, rocks on the outer part of the Manacles and fell on her portside. The captain, first mate and nine crew put off in the ship's boat for the shore leaving five on board, who were rescued by two local cutters, just before the masts fell leaving all of the vessel underwater.
- 29 November – the Glasgow steamer SS St George (United Kingdom) foundered 25 miles (40 km) from Portreath, while bound for Nantes from Swansea. Ten of the crew and the engineer's wife went down with the steamer. The eight remaining crew took to the ship's boat and capsized in the surf at Portreath with the loss of one more life.

December

- 6 December – A steamer landed some fishermen from an unnamed lugger (France) which foundered while returning from the Newfoundland fishery.
- 7 December – the Padstow schooner Edith (United Kingdom), lying at anchor, was struck by the Excelsior and sank about 3 cables from Carrick Nath Point.
- 7 December – the Cowes vessel Helen (United Kingdom) collided with the Hayle schooner Giles Lang and was abandoned off the Lizard. The crew were saved by the Giles Lang.
- 7 December – the crew abandoned the Fleetwood schooner, Matthew Wignall (United Kingdom) after being hit by the barquentine Fonthill, 8 to 10 miles west north-west of the Longships. The five crew were picked up by the Fonthill. The abandoned schooner drifted ashore, bottom up, at the Gassick, between Sennen Cove and St Just.
- 7 December – the barque Sotir (Greece) grounded on a rock on the Kits Cairn, near Porthchapel. After 10 or 15 minutes the barque was carried out to sea by the wind and tide. Before the barque foundered, two local boats following the vessel, took off the ten crew and landed them at Porthgwarra.
- 15 December – The Beaumaris schooner Eilian Hill collided with the steamship Ernest in Mount's Bay and sank immediately. The crew were landed at Falmouth by the Ernest.
- 27 December – the Truro schooner Carvedras (United Kingdom) sank about 5 miles (8.0 km) south-west of the Longships Lighthouse. The crew took to the ship's boat and were rescued by the St Ives lifeboat, about 2 miles (3.2 km) off St Ives.

== 1883 ==
January

- 9 January – while bound for Dinan from Swansea, with a cargo of coal, the Guernsey registered cutter Spring was in collision with a schooner and suffered damage to her jib boom and stern. The Sennen Cove lifeboat Denzil and Maria Onslow ( assisted with her safe anchorage and took off the three man crew.
- 26 January – the Amsterdam brig Janna (Netherlands) struck the Manacles while carrying coal from Cardiff to the West Indies. The nine crew were landed at Porthoustock by the St Keverne boat Goodrievey Bay.

February

- 2 February – the Hayle schooner Storm Nymph (United Kingdom) was driven ashore near the entrance of Newquay harbour. One member of crew jumped overboard and was not seen again, the rest were saved by the rocket apparatus. Storm Nymph was carrying coal from Cardiff to Hayle.
- 2 February – an unknown steamer sank off Cape Cornwall with the loss of all hands.

March

- 30 March – The Rye schooner Alarm was driven ashore near Polperro and quickly broke up. There were three survivors and the captain, mate and three others drowned.

April

- 4 April – three unnamed barges (United Kingdom) owned by people from St Just were loading sand from Swanpool beach, Falmouth, during a strong easterly breeze. The barges were overloaded and unable to sail and became total wrecks.

September

- 1 September – Newport, Rhode Island registered barque G. I. Jones (United Kingdom) carrying phosphate rock from Bull River, California to Falmouth, driven ashore at Stackhouse Cove in a SSW gale and quickly broke up. All thirteen crew were lost. According to Treglown (2011) the captain and nine of his crew lost and two saved. According to The Cornishman newspaper the barque was owned by Messrs Jones Brothers of Newport, Monmouthshire and one crew and a boy survived. A pilot from Falmouth also died. Ancestry.com records shows the list of those who died in this shipwreck, and the total listed as D.W. (death by total wreck) was eleven.
- September – a ship's boat with the name Pensee-Augrey was found at St Ives on 1 October and wreckage was washed ashore. A body of a young man was found at Hawke's Point.

November

- 7 November – the Modina (United Kingdom), a coastal steamer from Cardiff became a wreck on the Manacles Rock, while attempting to pass on the landward side of the reef. Modina was carrying coal from Newport to Devoran

December

- 1 December – ketch Hope of Guernsey struck the Runnelstone. There was no loss of life.
- Unknown date – Storm Nymph (United Kingdom) wrecked at Newquay.
- Unknown date – the Padstow smack Willie (United Kingdom) ran onto rocks west of Portreath and became a complete wreck.

== 1884 ==
- 26 January – the 381-ton barque Cviet (Austria-Hungary) of Ragusa was deliberately run aground, 300 m east of Porthleven harbour, during a severe gale, in an attempt to save the lives of the crew. 600-ton of logs were salvaged and three of the crew lost their lives. 29 January according to Treglown (2011) The remains of the hull, sparrs, rope, sails and utensils were put on auction on 14 February and approximately £350 was made.
- 28 March – the Cunard iron-screw steamer Balbec (United Kingdom) left Liverpool with five passengers and a general cargo for Le Havre, striking a rock about 1 mile (1.6 km) south-east of the Longships Lighthouse. With 8 feet (2.4 m) of water in the hold the captain decided to run ashore at full-speed; Nanjizal (also known as Millbay) was the nearest convenient place. There was no loss of life. The 774-ton vessel was sold by public auction on 5 April 1884 at Nanjizal followed by another auction at Sennen Cove of the rigging, sails, several lots of brass and copper, four ship's-boats, sixty hams, thirteen cases of lobsters, etc.
- 13 April – the steamship Lady Dalhousie (United Kingdom) struck the Chynoweth rock, one of The Manacles, on Sunday morning while in ballast for Newport. She became a total wreck the following day.All the crew were saved.
- 7 May – the St Ives smack The Brothers (United Kingdom) sank 28 miles (45 km) off St Ives Head with the loss of all six on board.
- 15 May – the 513-ton vessel Athanasios Vagliamos (Greece) sprang a leak 180 miles (290 km) west of the Isles of Scilly while carrying coal from Swansea for Italy. While heading for land the vessel was driven ashore on rocks just above Port Gaverne. The three crew took to the boat and landed safely ashore.
- 10 October – the Penzance schooner Eliza (United Kingdom) grounded on the Dunbar at the entrance to Padstow harbour while carrying coal from Porthcawl to Penzance. The crew were taken off by the lifeboat Arab.
- 26 October – the Plymouth ketch Pearl (United Kingdom) became a wreck after going ashore near Padstow during a gale.
- 28 October – the Sunderland screw-steamer Avebury (United Kingdom), carrying 450 tons of iron ore and 200 tons of esparto to Cardiff stranded at Rosemodress, near Lamorna. All the crew managed to get ashore.
- 5 December – steamer Alliance (United Kingdom) disappeared while en route from Cardiff to St Nazaire with a cargo of coal. Wreckage was found off Boscastle.

== 1885 ==
- 1 February – the Barquentine Petrellen (Norway) of Porsgrund beached at Long Rock, Cornwall. The ten crew were the first to be rescued by the Penzance lifeboat Dora
- 17 March – the brig Estar (Kingdom of Italy) ran ashore at Talland Bay. An attempt to refloat the brig the following day failed.
- 17 April – the 85-ton steamer Ransome (United Kingdom) hit the Low Lee rocks off Mousehole. With pumps working on full she sank just a few metres short of Penzance harbour, her captain's home town. Within six days bad weather had destroyed the wreck.
- 24 April – the small coaster Beryl of Aberystwyth sank after striking the Manacles with a cargo of coal for Cadgwith. The two crew rowed ashore.
- 19 July – the barque Luigia Maddalena Italy of Genoa ran aground at Tol-Pedn-Penwith while in ballast from Le Havre to Cardiff. The crew managed to reach the shore.
- 21 July – the steamer Cheerful (United Kingdom) sank 18 miles (29 km) NNW of St Ives. The steamer was run down by HMS Hecla (1878) and sank in four minutes. Of the twenty-three crew and twenty-six passengers, eleven crew lost their lives. A mineral, abhurite, formed from the reaction between seawater and the cargo of tin ingot, has been found on the wreck.
- 22 October – the Bencruachan (United Kingdom) foundered after a collision with the steamer Bilbao 6 miles (9.7 km) off the Wolf Rock. The crew were saved by the steamer Methyr.
- 28 November – the twelve crew of the 328 ton, Cardiff registered steamer, Annie Veron (United Kingdom) abandoned ship near St Ives. The vessel foundered shortly after.
- 17 December – the steamer Alster (United Kingdom) sailed from Swansea with a cargo of coal for Saint-Nazaire and struck the Three Stone Ore, near Gurnard's Head. After 10 minutes the vessel came off and headed for St Ives, sinking about a 1.5 miles (2.4 km) off St Ives Head. The fifteen crew were picked up by local boats.

== 1886 ==
January

- 9 January – the stern-board and part of the keel of the Hartlepool steamship Hettie (United Kingdom) was washed ashore at Trevone Bay.

March

- 3 March – Porthleven mackerel boat The Miriam (PZ114) (United Kingdom) sank after a collision with the Acacia. Four of the seven crew drowned.
- 20 March – unnamed ship from Venice came ashore at Penvose, Cadgwith.
- 21 March – steamship Newton (United Kingdom) steamed onto Tonacombe High cliffs, Morwenstow, north Cornwall, in thick fog with the crew of 18 floating ashore on the wreckage. She was in ballast and bound for Newport from Berehaven.
- 22 March – Glasgow registered, full-rigged ship Port Chalmers (United Kingdom) left Falmouth for Liverpool and struck the Lowlands, a short distance west of The Manacles.
- 25 March – brig Devines (France) was embayed at Penberth, and while waiting for a change of wind, went ashore and is expected to become a total wreck.

April

- 13 April – the St Athens (United Kingdom) of Inverness foundered off the Longships while heading for Runcorn from Plymouth. The crew were rescued and landed at Kingstown, Ireland.

July

- 5 July – the Liverpool iron steamer Lincoln (United Kingdom) struck the Runnelstone in thick fog and sank off St Loy's Cove. The fourteen crew abandoned ship about a mile off St Loy's and reached Penzance.

August

- 8 August – the Hartlepool steamer Acolus (United Kingdom) collided with the steamer Valetta (United Kingdom) and sank off Padstow. The crew were saved.

September

- 15 September – the St Ives schooner Bonita (United Kingdom), sank between the Longships and the Runnel-stone, when the three-mast schooner Rescue ran into her. Bonita sank within the hour and the crew were landed at Penzance by the Rescue.
- 28 September – 2,924-ton steamship Suffolk (United Kingdom), on voyage from Baltimore to London was wrecked in fog on the eastern side of Lizard Point. The 45 people aboard were saved by the Polpeor and Cadgwith lifeboats ( Royal National Lifeboat Institution). She was carrying flour, wheat, tobacco, resin, timber and 161 bullocks. Some of the bullocks made it ashore, were kept in the Caerthillian Valley for quarantine and sold for £9–£10 each; feed was given to those at the bottom of cliffs where they were eventually slaughtered and sold. The wreck was sold to a Falmouth man for £11 Two year previous, on 4 January 1884, she was extensively damaged in a collision off the Bishop Rock with the German ship Uranus.

October

- October – A large quantity of wreckage was washed up between Mullion Cove and The Lizard including a stern with the name Conquistador (United Kingdom). The Glasgow vessel sailed from Newport, Wales for Málaga on 13 October.
- 14 October – the Dundee steamship Indus (United Kingdom) foundered off Trevose Head. The thirty crew were rescued by the Port Issac lifeboat Richard and Sarah and a gig.
- 16 October – brig Albert Wilhelm (Germany) on voyage from Ramsey to Fowey hit the Stones reef at Godrevy and drifted onto the sands at Lelant. Four saved by the Isis ( Royal National Lifeboat Institution) of Hayle and four by breeches-buoy.
- 17 October – the Sarah Anderson (United Kingdom) ran aground on the beach at Trebarwith Strand, Tintagel (all on board perished). She was carrying gold, silver and copper ore from Coquimbo, Chile, to Fleetwood via Falmouth.

November

- 7 November – the stern of the Sinbad (United Kingdom) was found on the rocks at Portreath.

December

- 4 December – the Mary Capper (United Kingdom) left Penryn for Belfast and collided with the J H Heuls off Black Head (The Lizard) and quickly sank. The crew were picked up by the J H Heuls.
- 9 December – the Alliance (United Kingdom) wrecked on the seaward side of the Albert Pier, Penzance.
- 9 December – the Petrel of Leith a schooner was wrecked at Wine Cove near Treyarnon bay. Two were lost out of a crew of seven. The cargo of marble was salvaged.

== 1887 ==
- January – All hands, bar one, were drowned when the Alarcrity ran down the Padstow steamer Leila (United Kingdom) off Trevose Head.
- 23 January – The captain and crew drowned when the Barranca was wrecked near Porthleven.
- 13 March – Schooner Gypsy Queen (United Kingdom) of Padstow carrying cement wrecked on Maenheere Rock, The Lizard.
- 20 August – The eight crew abandoned the steamer, Acklington after she struck the Runnel Stone. The vessel was carrying 300 tons of coal from Newport for Portland.

== 1888 ==
- January – The steamship Godolphin (United Kingdom) was driven ashore at Black Head on the east coast of The Lizard.
- 22 January – The schooner Pfenna Wilhelmina (United Kingdom) went ashore at Eastern Green, near Penzance Harbour in dense fog. The cargo of coal was discharged.
- 10 March – 894-ton barque Lady Dufferin (United Kingdom) of Plymouth hit the Mulvin during a gale and wreckage was washed into Polpeor Cove. The crew of seventeen were saved by the Lizard lifeboat ( Royal National Lifeboat Institution). She was carrying sleepers and rails to Argentina for the railway being built there.
- 29 March – the three-mast vessel William Tapscott, bound for Cardiff from Rio de Janeiro with 600 tons of granite, ran aground at Bude. The crew reached the shore and the vessel is a total wreck.
- 17 May – the 111-ton wooden brigantine Jeune Hortense (France) dragged her anchors in Mount's Bay and went ashore at Eastern Green to the east of Penzance. The crew of three and the boy were saved by the Penzance lifeboat Dora ( Royal National Lifeboat Institution).
- 17 May – the ship Otto was stranded. Later she was renamed Providence and operated out of Penzance.
- 17 May – brigantine Nulli Secundus (Germany) stranded. Previously named Tobaco and stranded on the Eastern Green, Mount's Bay in 1865.
- July – a wreck off Polpeor led to absenteeism of 50 per cent at Landewednack school.
- 30 July – 76-ton schooner Robert (United Kingdom) of Caernarvon came ashore close to Brumble on Lizard Point. She was carrying slates from her home port, many of which were used in the nearby village. The crew of four took to their boat and were saved.
- 23 August – the ketch Eliza (United Kingdom) went ashore on the western end of the beach at Pentewan; the crew were saved.
- 29 September – the 84-ton schooner Arab (United Kingdom) of Dublin carrying 180 tons of coal from Swansea to Poole wrecked at Polbarrow, Lizard Point. The crew of five took to the ship's boat and landed at Caerleon Cove.
- 20 October – the Dublin schooner Fair City (United Kingdom) sank off The Brisons. The seven crew were landed at Plymouth.
- 8 November – Cunard's steamship Nantes (United Kingdom) collided with the barque Theodor Rüger (Germany), 36 nautical miles (67 km) east-south-east of the Lizard and both foundered. Only three of Nantes crew survived and sixteen of Theodor Rüger.

== 1889 ==
- 29 January – Plymouth trawler Blue Bell stranded on Eastern Green, Penzance while trying to make the harbour. Her crew of four were rescued by the Penzance lifeboat Dora ( Royal National Lifeboat Institution).
- 2 April – Brixham trawler Inflexible struck the Stones, near Godrevy Lighthouse in a gale and became a wreck. This is the first wreck on the Stones since the erection of the lighthouse in 1859.
- 12 April 1889 – The fishing brig Amelia (France) was abandoned at sea and foundered off The Lizard. The captain and twenty-one crew were landed at Plymouth by the steamer Lysgand (Belgium).
- 30 August 1889 – The steamer Asia (Denmark) struck the Vyneck, near Cape Cornwall and sank with the loss of two crew. The remaining twenty crew and passengers took to the boats and landed at a nearby cove. She was carrying coal from Penarth to St Petersburg.
- 2 September – The smack Elizabethan while heading north, either struck the Vyneck rock or the wreck of the steamer Asia and sank within half a mile in deep water, near Wheal Castle. The crew were picked up by the schooner New Design.
- October – Welsh collier Llandaff (United Kingdom) at Land's End (also wrecked on the Cornish coast in October 1899)
- 15 October – Malta (United Kingdom) bound for Liverpool from Italy went ashore in dense fog at Wheal Castle, near Botallack, St Just in Penwith; vessel was a complete loss but there were no deaths
- Unknown date Gleaner (United Kingdom) wrecked at Newquay

== 1890 ==
- 27 January – A derelict barque was seen being towed by steamer, off Sennen, with no signs of crew on board. At around 2000 hours an unmanned New Brunswick barque Howard A Turner came ashore on rocks at Penzer Point, near Lamorna Cove. The barque was carrying timber for Dublin and was believed to have been abandoned ten days before and the crew were landed at Liverpool.
- 8 February – The Greek steamer Spyridion Vagliane (Greece) struck The Manacles, off the Lizard and sank almost immediately. Eight of the crew landed on nearby Godrevy beach.
- 23 February – The crew of the schooner William Henry (United Kingdom) abandoned ship following a collision with the trawler Active. The schooner is believed to have foundered a few miles off the Wolf Rock.
- 28 March – The crew of the Dieppois (France) landed at Sennen Cove, in their own boat, when the steamer hit rocks near the Land's End.
- 21 April – Brankelow (United Kingdom) of Liverpool and chartered by the Russian government ran aground on Loe Bar during a gale while bound for Kronstadt from Cardiff. She was carrying 3000 tons of coal which was salvaged along with her engines.
- 23 June – The Cardiff registered, 706 ton Scheddt (United Kingdom) carrying coal from Newport to Bordeaux came ashore on the cliffs under the Coastguard Station at Pendeen. The captain and crew landed at Pendeen Cove.
- 14 November – The Devoran schooner Marianne (United Kingdom) foundered while carrying coal from Penarth to Devoran. The vessel was found bottom up, 4 miles (6.4 km) from Boscastle. Four of the five crew perished.
- 12 December – The Liverpool schooner Albert was driven ashore in a strong wind, onto the beach at Porthtowan. Four or five crew lost.
- Kishon (United Kingdom) parted her tow off Trevose Head from the steam tug Australia, and was driven ashore near Bude breakwater. Her crew of eight was saved by the rocket lifesaving crew.
- Ketch Louise Ernest (France) en route for Nantes from Falmouth was unable to round the Lizard and turned back. She hit Castle Point, St Mawes and the crew of five men and a boy were taken off by the lifeboat, Jane Whittington.
