= Sindia =

Sindia may refer to:

== Places ==
- Sindia (Lycia), ancient town of Lycia
- Sindia, Sardinia, Italy
- Sindia, Senegal, in Thiès Region

== Other uses ==
- Scindia or Sindhia, former ruling dynasty of Gwalior, India
- The Sindia, a 1901 shipwreck on the beach at Ocean City, New Jersey

== See also ==
- Sindhi (disambiguation)
