= Indus Health Plus =

- Company type: Private
- Industry: Healthcare
- Founded: 2000
- Headquarters: Pune, India
- Area served: India, UAE
- Services: Preventive Health Checkup
- Number of employees: 300
- Website: indushealthplus.com

Indus Health Plus (P) Ltd. is a "Preventive Health Checkup" Company. The company provides services through their healthcare delivery partners in Maharashtra, Gujarat, Karnataka, Kerala, Telangana, Andhra Pradesh, Tamil Nadu, Goa, Madhya Pradesh, Delhi, Haryana, Uttar Pradesh and Punjab. Recently, Indus Health Plus has also started United Arab Emirates (UAE) operations.

A 2005 report of the National Commission on Macroeconomics and Health states that "Prevention of diseases, particularly Non-communicable disease (lifestyle diseases) that are expensive to treat, is the most cost-effective strategy for a country facing scarce resources."

== History ==
Indus Health Plus was founded in 2000 at Pune. In 2007, the company opened branch office at Mumbai and in 2009, the company opened North Regional office at Delhi and partnered with a hospital.

== Board of directors ==
- Kanchan Naikawadi - Director
- Amol Naikawadi - Joint Managing Director
- Parnal Dekhane - Joint Managing Director

== See also ==
- Frost & Sullivan
- ASSOCHAM
- Preventive healthcare
- List of hospitals in India
- Medlife
- Flipkart Health+
- MrMed
