= Shentu =

Shentu may refer to:

- Shentu, Fujian, town in Zhangpu County, Fujian, China
- Shentu (surname), Chinese surname
- Shentu (deity) or Shenshu, Chinese guardian deity
- Tianzhu (India), a Chinese name for India

== See also ==
- Tianzhu (disambiguation)
- Yindu (disambiguation)
