= Yindu =

Yindu may refer to:

- Yindu District, in Anyang, Henan, China
- Yindu Chin, or Dai, an ethnic tribe of Chin, Myanmar
- Yìndù, the Hanyu Pinyin transliteration of the Chinese name for modern India

== See also ==
- Tianzhu (disambiguation), an older Chinese name for India
- Shentu (disambiguation)
- Hindu (disambiguation)
