= Rajiv Gandhi National University of Law =

Public law school in Punjab, India

- Motto: Knowledge Empowers
- Type: National Law University
- Established: 2006; 19 years ago
- Affiliations: UGC, BCI
- Chancellor: Chief Justice of Punjab and Haryana High Court
- Vice-Chancellor: Dr. Jai Shankar Singh
- Visitor: Justice Augustine George Masih
- Students: 900 undergraduates and 30 graduates
- Location: Patiala, Punjab, India
- Campus: 50 acres (0.20 km^{2})
- Website: rgnul.ac.in

Rajiv Gandhi National University of Law (RGNUL), is a public law school in Patiala, Punjab, India. It is one of the 27 National Law University located in India. The university was established under Punjab Act No. 12 of 2006, enacted by the Punjab Legislative Assembly as a university dedicated to the field of Legal Education. RGNUL is affiliated to UGC and approved by the Bar Council of India. It is one of the autonomous law schools in India.

== Administration ==
The Chief Justice of Punjab and Haryana High Court is the de facto Chancellor of the university. The first vice-chancellor of the university was Prof. (Dr.) Gurjit Singh. The institution is currently being headed by Prof (Dr.) Jai Shankar Singh.

== Location ==
Originally located at Mohindra Kothi, The Mall, Patiala; the institution started functioning with effect from 26th May 2006. From the session of 2013, Rajiv Gandhi National University of Law shifted to its now permanent 50-acre (20 ha)campus located at Sidhuwal, 12 km (7.5 mi) from Patiala.

== Programmes Offered ==
RGNUL offers a 5-year B.A. LL.B (Honours) programme and a 1-year LL.M. with an intake of 180 seats and 80 seats per annum, respectively. Admission to these programmes is through Common Law Admission Test (CLAT). Ph.D programmes are also offered.

== Rankings ==
University rankings

Law – India
- NIRF (2023): 20
- India Today (2022): ?

The National Institutional Ranking Framework (NIRF) ranked Rajiv Gandhi National University of Law 9 among law colleges in 2023.

== See also ==
- Legal education in India
