= Sindh (disambiguation) =

Sind or Sindh can refer to:

- Sindh, a province of Pakistan established in 1970, renamed from Sind province in 1990
- Sind Province (1936–1955), of British India 1936−1947 and West Pakistan 1947−1955
- Sind Division, of the Bombay Presidency province of British India, 1843–1936
- Sind (caliphal province), a caliphal province, 711–861
- Sindh River, Madhya Pradesh and Uttar Pradesh in India
- Sind Valley (Kashmir)
- Sind sparrow, a bird species and the unofficial provincial bird of Sindh
- Sind bat, a bat species
- Sind woodpecker, a bird species
- PNS Sind, a ship of the Pakistan Navy
- HMIS Sind (K274), a ship of the Royal Indian Navy

== See also ==
- Sindhi (disambiguation)
- Sindhu (disambiguation)
- Hindu (disambiguation)
- Districts of Pakistan § Sindh
- History of Sindh
- Scinde Dawk, defunct postal system of Sindh
- Scinde Medal, British East India Company award for the British conquest of Sindh
- Scinde Railway, former railway in Sindh
- Scinde, Punjab & Delhi Railway, former railway in British India
- Scinde Camel Corps, of the British Indian Army
- 14th Horse (Scinde Horse), armoured corps of the Indian Army
