= Tianzhu =

Tianzhu may refer to:

== Locations in China ==
- Mount Tianzhu (天柱山), in Anhui
- Tianzhu County, Guizhou (天柱县), in Qiandongnan Miao and Dong Autonomous Prefecture, Guizhou
- Tenzhu Tibetan Autonomous County (天祝藏族自治县), or Tianzhu, in Wuwei, Gansu
- Tianzhu, Beijing (天竺地区), an area of Shunyi District, Beijing

== Other uses ==
- Tianzhu (Chinese name of God) (天主), the name of God used by Catholic Chinese
- Tianzhu (India) (天竺), an old Chinese name for the Indian subcontinent

== See also ==
- Yindu (disambiguation), a modern Chinese name for India
- Shentu (disambiguation)
