= Sarah Anderson (ship) =

Sarah Anderson was a British barque built in Liverpool in 1865. The ship was wrecked on 17 October 1886 en route from Coquimbo, Chile to Fleetwood, Lancashire when it ran aground on rocks near Trebarwith Strand, Cornwall.

== The ship ==
Sarah Anderson was built in 1885 by the company Thomas Royden and Sons of Liverpool. The ship had three masts and an iron hull, measured 52.7 m long and weighed 589 tons. The crew of eleven was returning from Chile with a cargo of ore. The ship put in at Falmouth, Cornwall to await orders before leaving for Fleetwood on 13 October 1886. Aside from the sailors, there were four passengers; a woman and her two children who boarded in Chile, as well as the captain’s wife.

== The wreck ==
The ship was caught in a fierce storm on 17 October 1886 and began to drift towards the north coast of Cornwall. Each day, Captain William Puxley held short church services on deck and the crew was observed praying on the poop deck on the morning of the wreck. As the storm worsened, the crew cut away the masts and cast the anchors in an attempt to save the ship. Meanwhile the Port Isaac lifeboat tried unsuccessfully for several hours to reach them. As the ship was over 300 m from shore, every attempt to reach it with rocket-fired breeches buoy also failed. Just before midday, the ship struck Otterham Rocks, a stack also known as Gull Rock. There appeared to be an explosion as the deck of the ship blew up, sending a great spout of water into the air. The ship then foundered and disappeared beneath the water, killing all on board.

== See also ==
- List of shipwrecks of Cornwall (1881–1890)
- Wreck report
