= Sindhu (disambiguation) =

Sindhu is the Sanskrit name for the Indus River, a major river in Tibet, India and Pakistan.

Sindhu may also refer to:

== People ==
- Afzal Sindhu, Pakistani politician
- P. V. Sindhu (born 1995), Indian badminton player
- Sindhu Menon, Indian film actress
- Sindhu Tolani (born 1983), Indian film actress
- Sindhu Vee, Indian comedian
- Sindhu (actress) (1972–2005)

== Other uses ==
- Sindhu, an alternative spelling of Sandhu clan of Jats
- Sindhu, a Chuhra sub-caste
- Sindhu (film), a 1975 Indian Malayalam film

== See also ==
- Indus (disambiguation)
- Sindh (disambiguation)
- Hindu (disambiguation)
- Sidhu (disambiguation)
- Sandhu, an Indian surname
- Sindhu Kingdom
- Sindhura, a raga in Hindustani classical music
