= Sindhi =

Sindhi may refer to:

- something from or related to Sindh, a province of Pakistan
- Sindhi people, an ethnic group from the Sindh region
- Sindhi language, the Indo-Aryan language spoken by them
- Sindhi cap, a hat worn by the Sindhi

== People with the name ==
- Sarkash Sindhi (1940–2012), poet of the Sindhi language
- Ubaidullah Sindhi (1872–1944), political activist
- Ahmad Bakhsh Sindhi (1917–2000), leader of the Indian National Congress
- Abu Raja Sindhi, 10th century Islamic scholar
- Abu Mashar Sindhi, 8th century Arabic historian and Islamic scholar

== See also ==
- Sindh (disambiguation)
- Sindi (disambiguation)
- Sindia (disambiguation)
- Sindi people, an ancient Scythian people
- Sinti, a Romani people of Central Europe
- Red Sindhi, a breed of cattle
- Scindia Ghat or Sindhia Ghat, riverside in Varanasi India
- Scindia or Sindhia, former ruling dynasty of Gwalior, India
- Scindian, passenger ship of convicts to Australia
- Shinde, Indian surname
