= Hindu (disambiguation) =

A Hindu is an adherent of Hinduism.

Hindu may also refer to:

== Places ==
- Hindu, Hiiu County, a village in Emmaste Parish, Hiiu County, Estonia
- Hindu, Orissaare Parish, a village in Orissaare Parish, Saare County, Estonia
- Hindu, Salme Parish, a village in Salme Parish, Saare County, Estonia
- Hindu, the ancient Persian name of the Indus River
- Hindu Kush, a mountain range near the border of Afghanistan and Pakistan

== Publishing ==
- The Hindu, an English-language newspaper published in India
- Hindu Tamil Thisai, or The Hindu (Tamil), a Tamil-language newspaper published in India
- The Hindu Group, an Indian publishing company that publishes The Hindu and the Hindu Tamil Thisai

== Other uses ==
- Hindu, adjective relating to the religion Hinduism
- Hindú, an Argentine sports club based in Greater Buenos Aires
- The Hindu (film), the original title of the 1954 American film Sabaka
- Maurice G. Hindus, a journalist.
- Hindus (horse), a racehorse.

== See also ==
- The Hindu (disambiguation)
- Hindoo (disambiguation)
- Sindhu (disambiguation)
- Sindh (disambiguation)
- Hind (disambiguation)
- Yindu (disambiguation), modern Chinese name for India
