= Indus Vallis =

Mars geographical feature

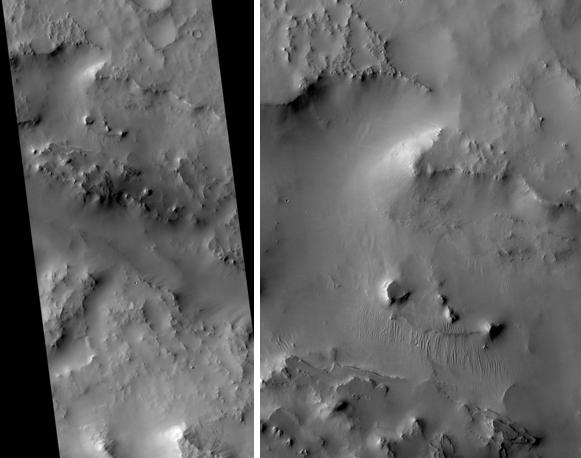
- Indus Vallis, as seen by HiRISE.
- Coordinates: 19.3°N 321.3°W

Indus Vallis is a vallis (valley) in the Arabia quadrangle of Mars, located at 19.3° North and 321.3° West. It is 307 km long and was named for the Indus River in Pakistan. The westernmost part of the valley is in the vicinity of Cassini Crater.
