= Sidhuwal =

Coordinates: 30.379°N 76.347°E

- Village
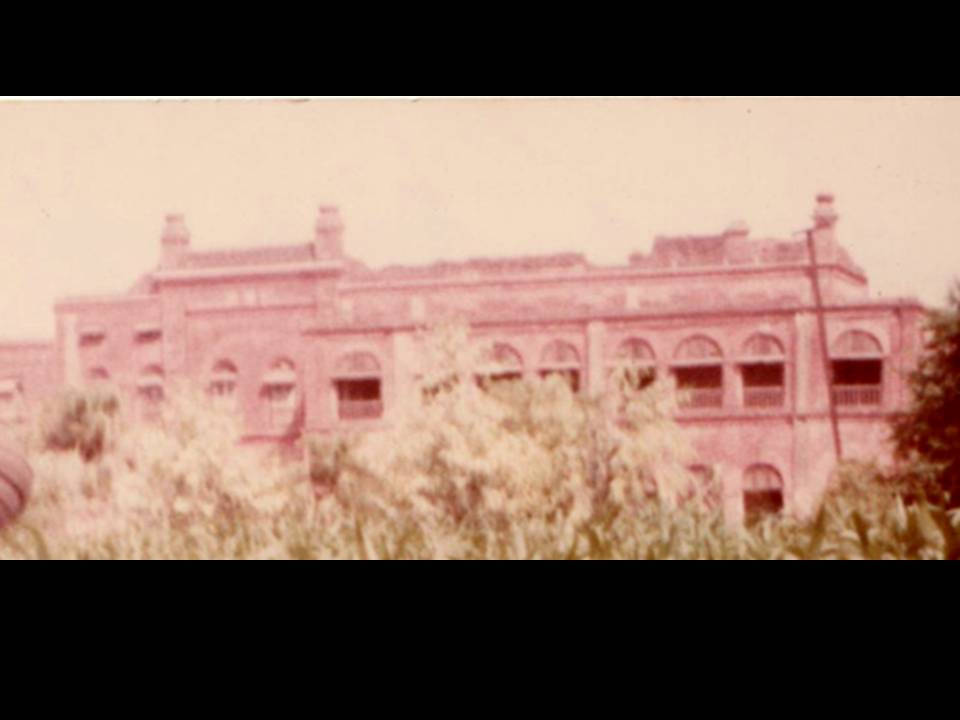
- Fort at Sidhuwal Village
- Interactive map of Sidhuwal
- Country: India
- State: Punjab
- District: Patiala district

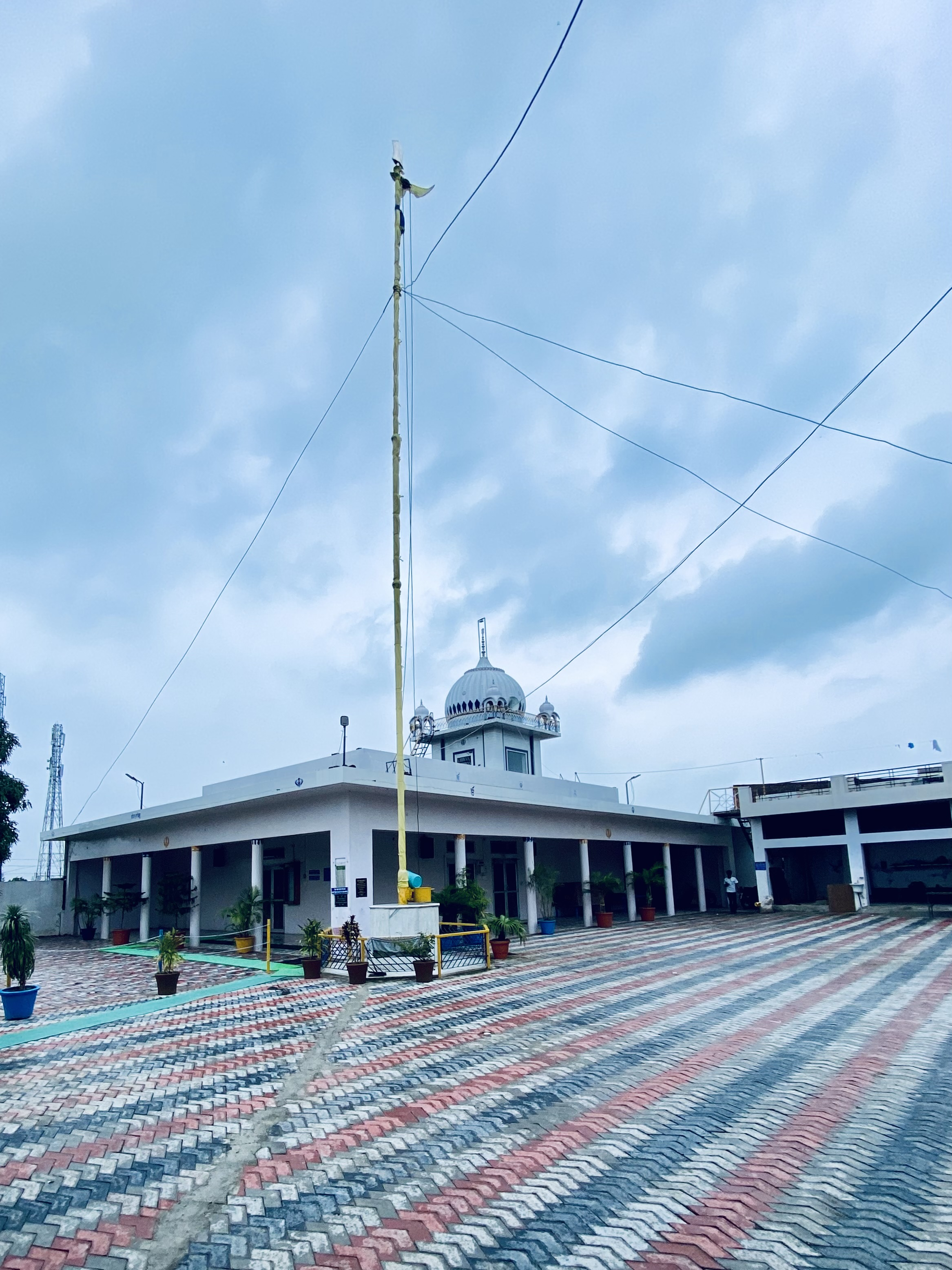

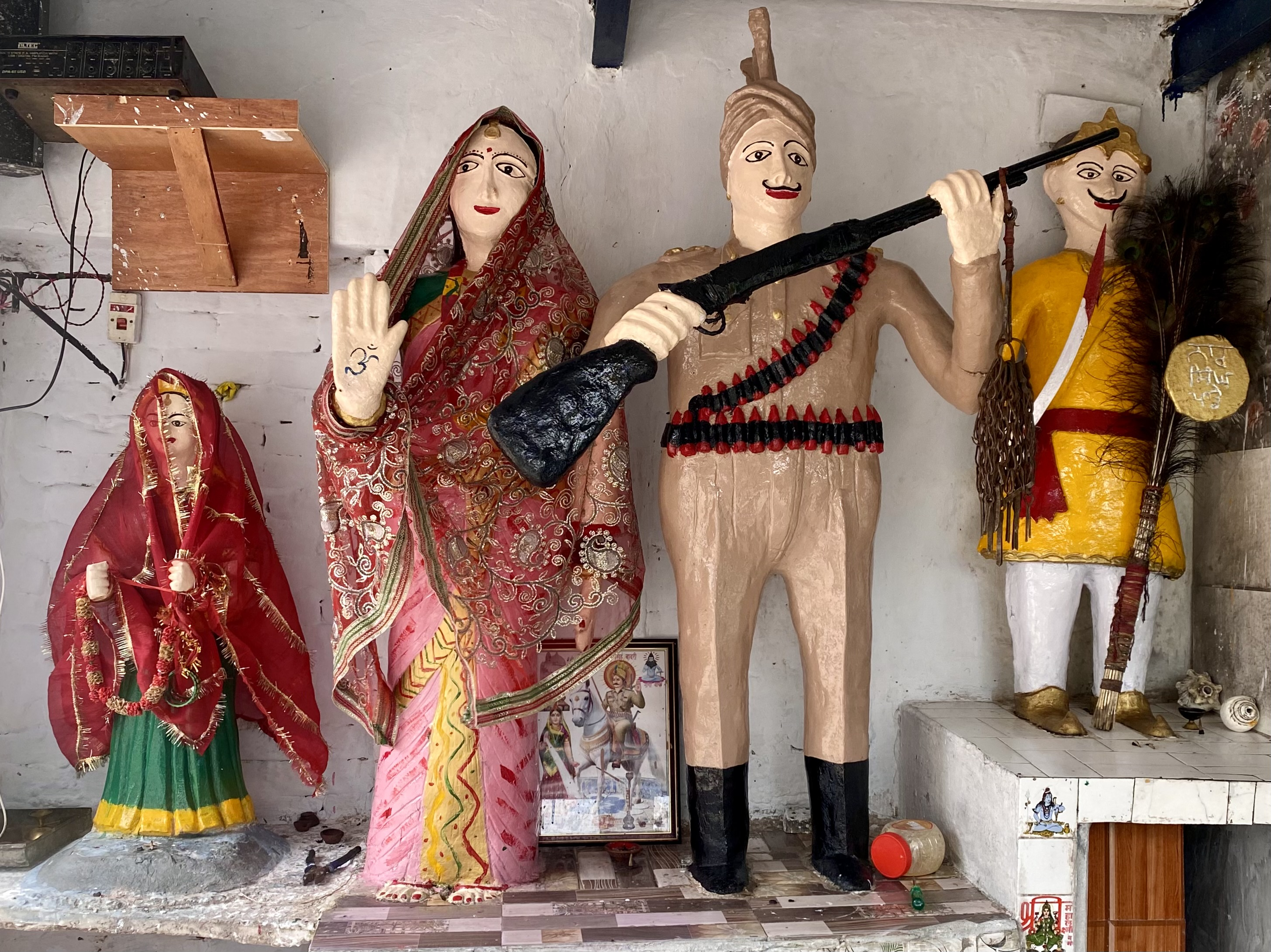
Statue of Sabal Singh Bavri and others at Gugga Maadi, Sidhuwal

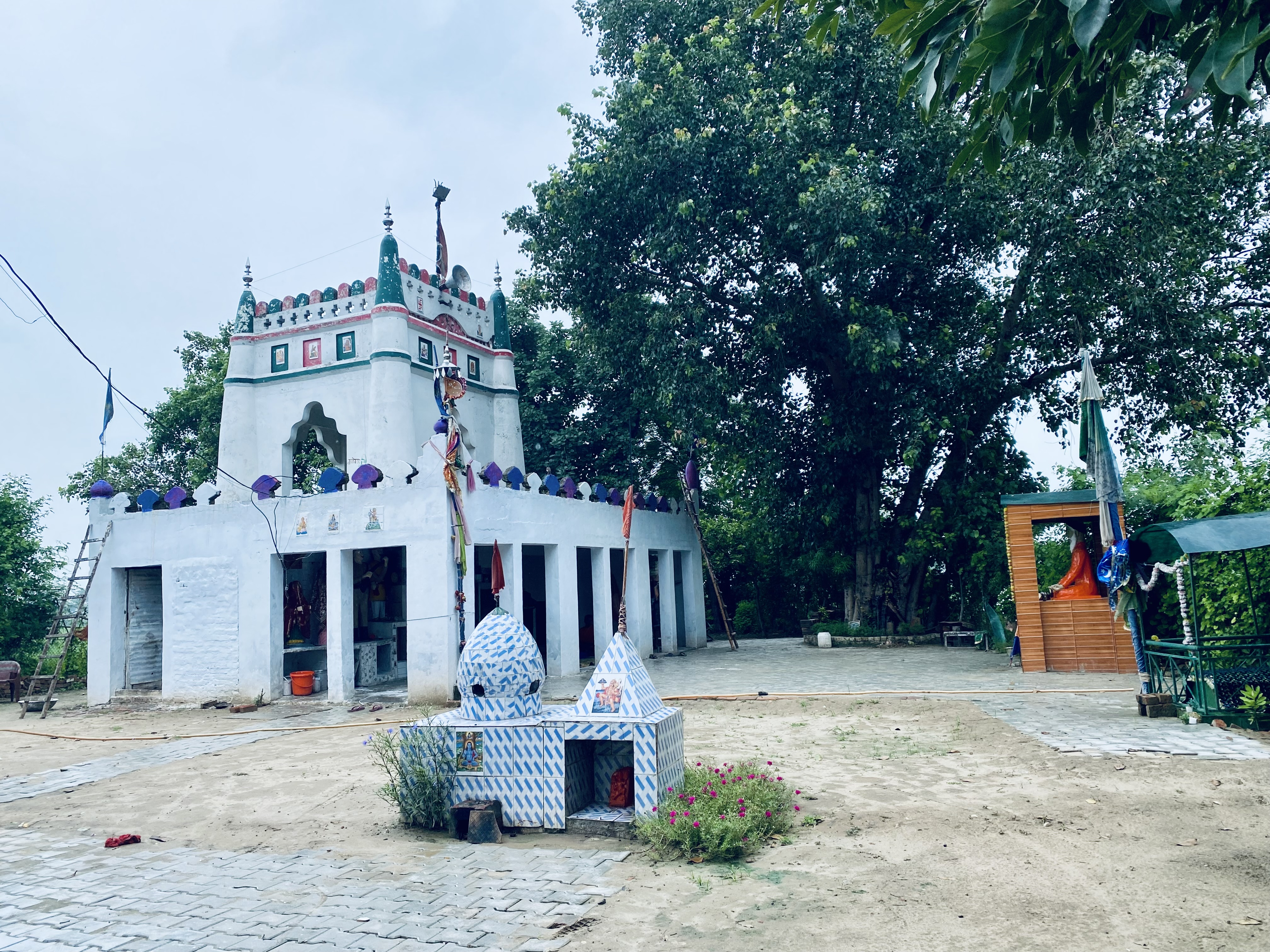
Gugga Maadi, Sidhuwal

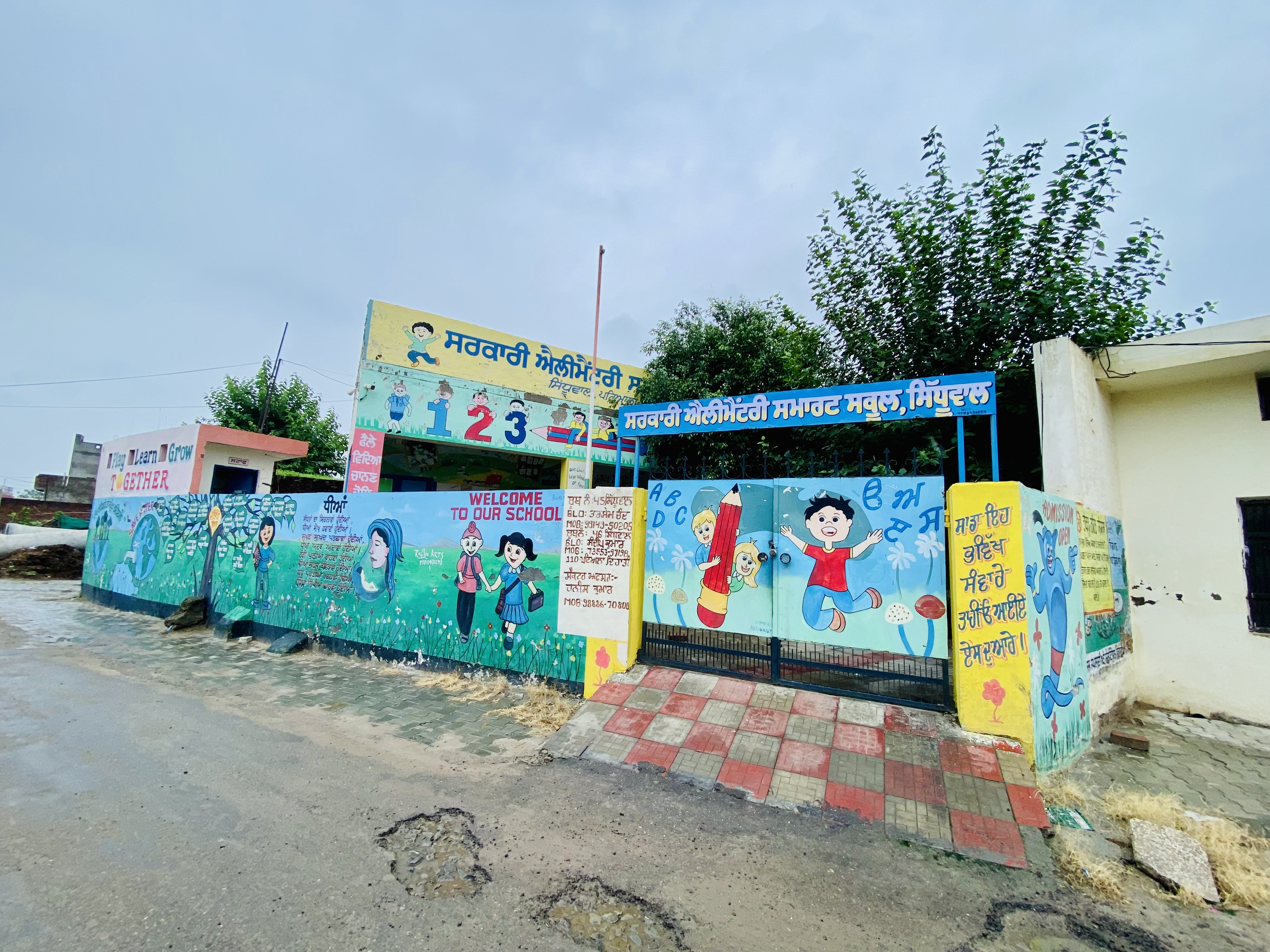
Govt. Elementary Smart School, Sidhuwal

Sidhuwal is a village on the road Patiala Bhadson approximately six kilometres from Patiala in Patiala tehsil in the Patiala district of the state of Punjab in northwest India. It is located 6 km towards North from District headquarters Patiala and 66 km from State capital Chandigarh. The village is located at the banks of Bhakra Main Line Canal. The total geographical area of the village is 644 hectares. Jasso Wal (1 km), Prem Nagar (2 km), Ranjit Nagar (2 km), Ucha Gaon (2 km), Anand Nagar (2 km) are the nearby Villages to Sidhuwal. Sidhu is surrounded by Sanour Tehsil towards the East, Nabha Tehsil towards the West, Bhuner Heri Tehsil towards the South, Ghana Tehsil towards the East. Patiala, Sirhind Fatehgarh Sahib, Gobindgarh, Nabha are the nearby cities to Sidhuwal.

== History ==
The last king of Sidhuwal state was Raja Bhai Fateh Jang Singh who was from the Bhaika family of Kaithal state. Sidhuwal and nearby villages were represented by the family of Chowdharys in the chambers of Maharaja of Patiala.

== Demographics ==
Though the name of the village suggests that it may be predominantly of Sidhu gotra, but majority of the population of the village consists of farmers with Kharoud gotra. The Punjabi language is spoken by all in the village. As per 2011 census, the village has a total population of 2290 with 478 households, of which 56% are males (1289) and 44% are females (1001), that means the sex ratio in the village is skewed as with 777 females per 1000 males. Though residents have now started sending their daughters to schools, still only 53.2% of females are educated as compared to 67.4% of males. The overall literacy rate of the village is 61.2%.

== Religion ==
Though the village has a strong secular culture, the majority population follows Sikhism. Some population also follows Hinduism and Islam. Besides a common Gurudwara, there is a large number of religious places of various religions in the village and they are visited by all.

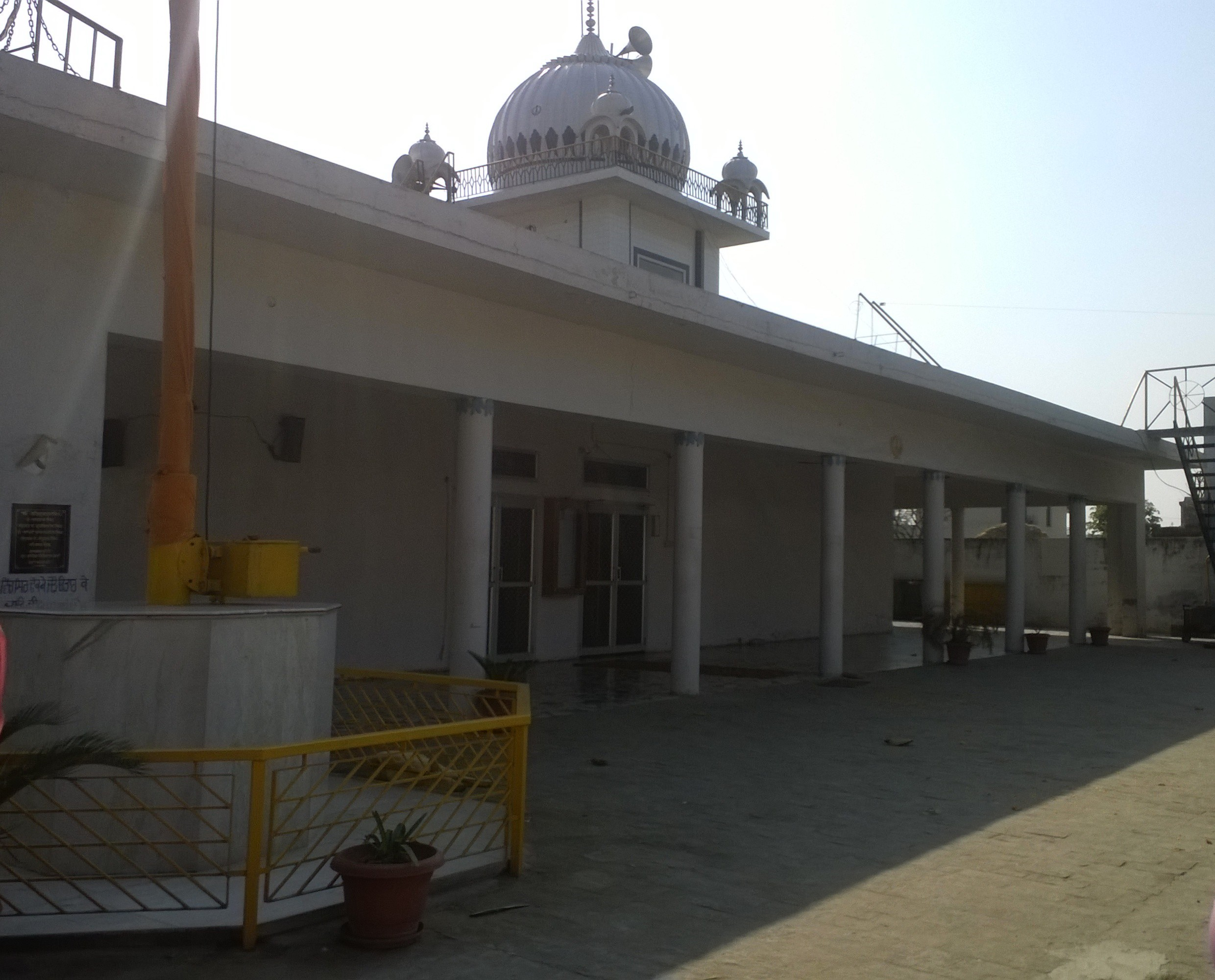
Gurudwara at Sidhuwal

== Education ==
Due to its proximity to Patiala city, it does not have many independent facilities like education. However, Rajiv Gandhi National University of Law (RGNUL) has been established in the village by the Punjab Government, which will not only give a boost to infrastructure in the village but also to the education of the students from the village. In addition, there is a Govt Senior Secondary Co-educational School in the village. Colleges near Sidhuwal are:

- Govt Medical College, Patiala
- Surya School of Pharmacy (SSP), Rajpura (Patiala)
- Gian Sagar College of Physiotherapy, VPO Banur; Distt. Patiala
- Sri Sukhmani Institute of Nursing, Dera Bassi; Distt. Patiala
- Divya Shiksha Gurukul College of Education For Women, Vill - Gholu Majra; Derabassi—lalru Highway; Distt - Patiala

== Occupation ==
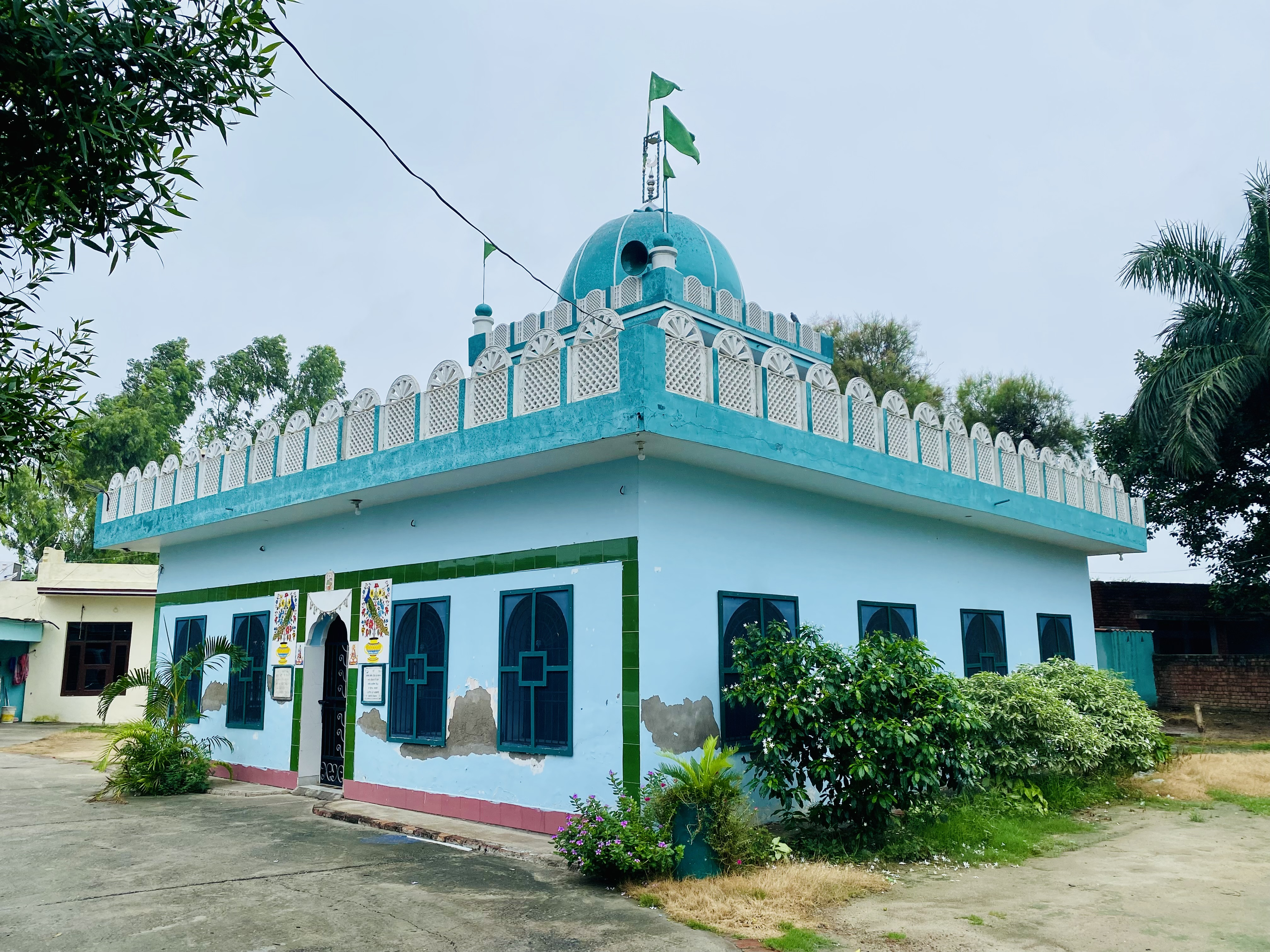
Lala'n Wala Peer

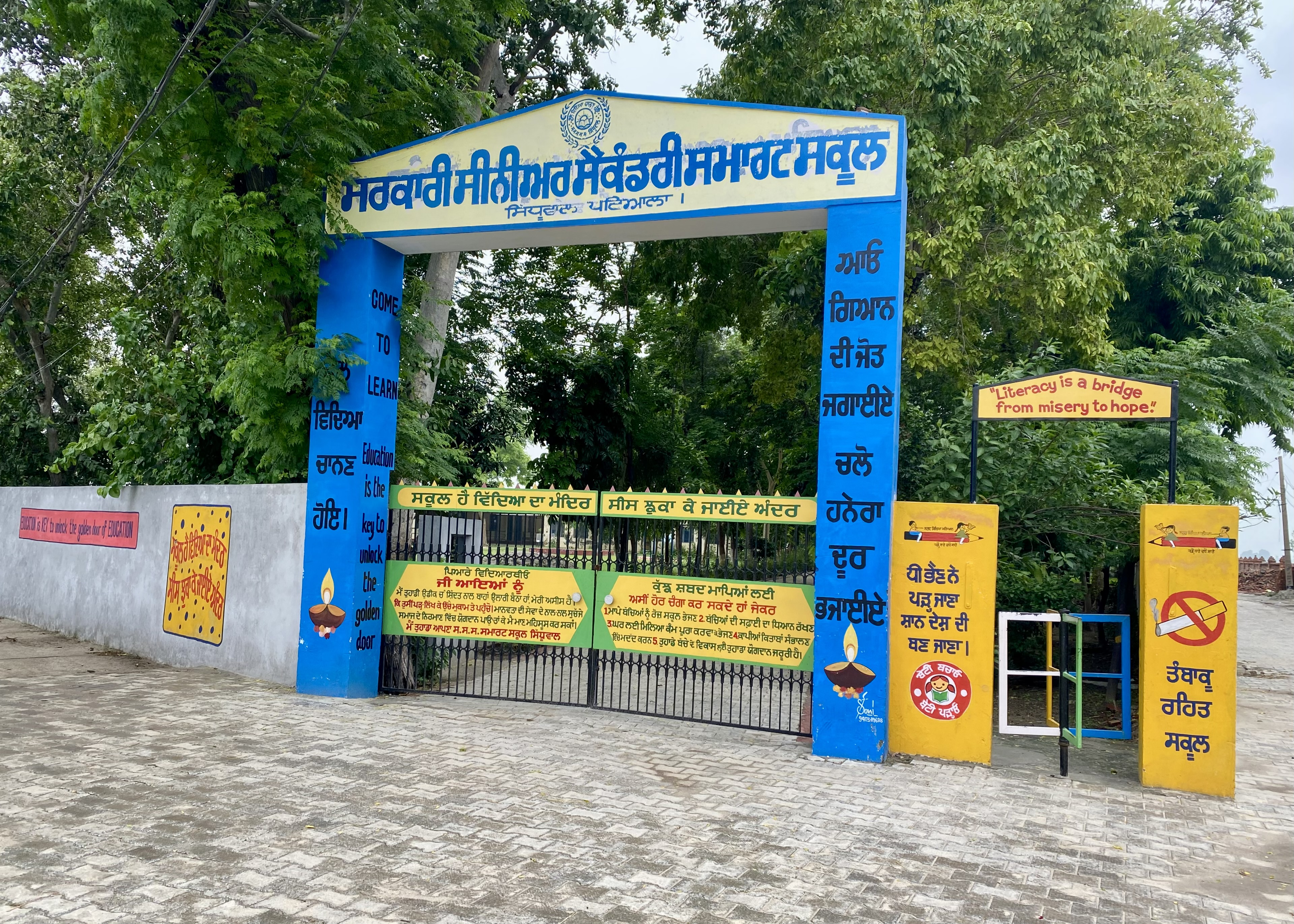
SSSS School, Sidhuwal

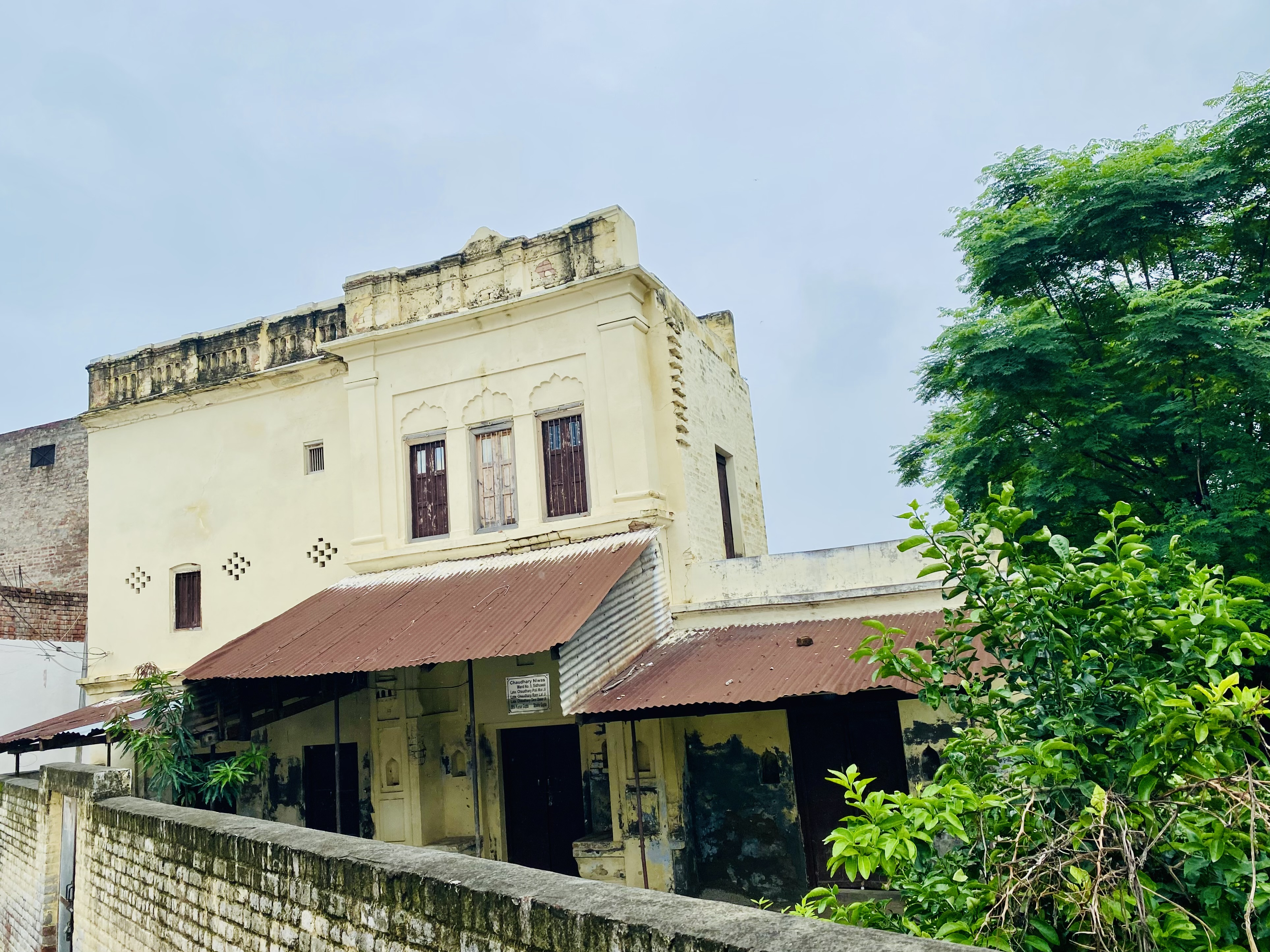
Old Haveli, Sidhuwal

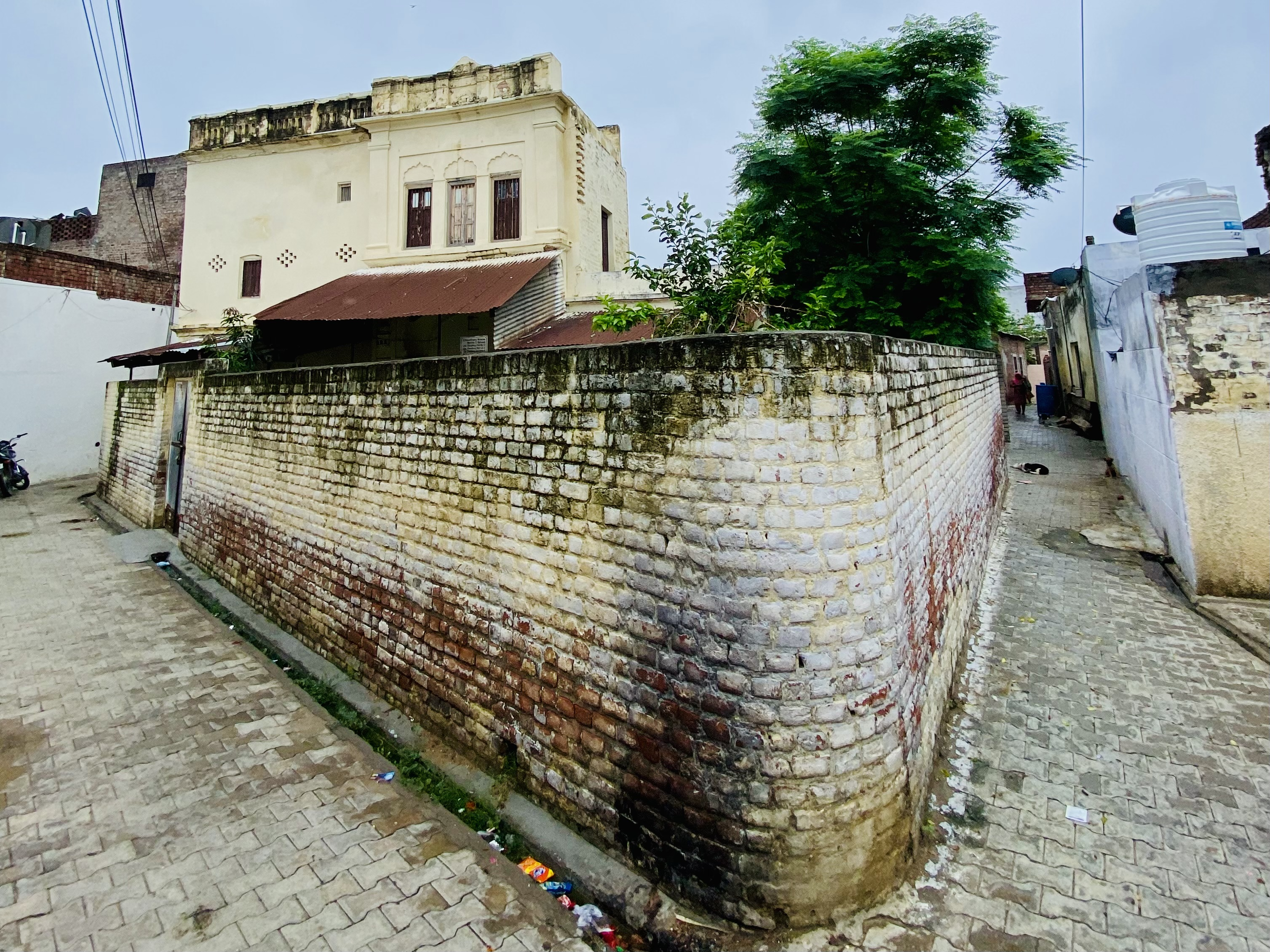
Old Haveli

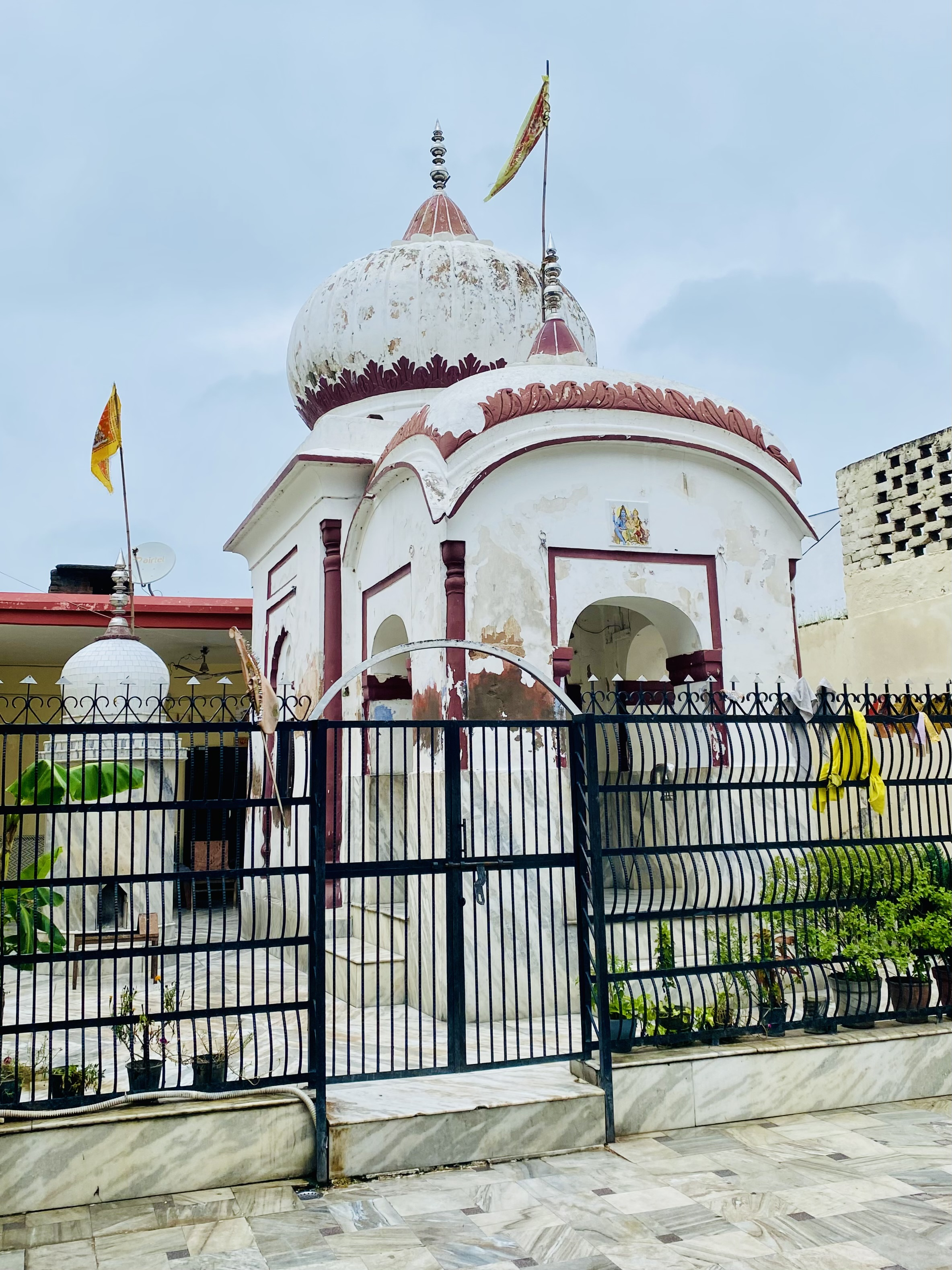
Ancient Shiv Temple, Sidhuwal

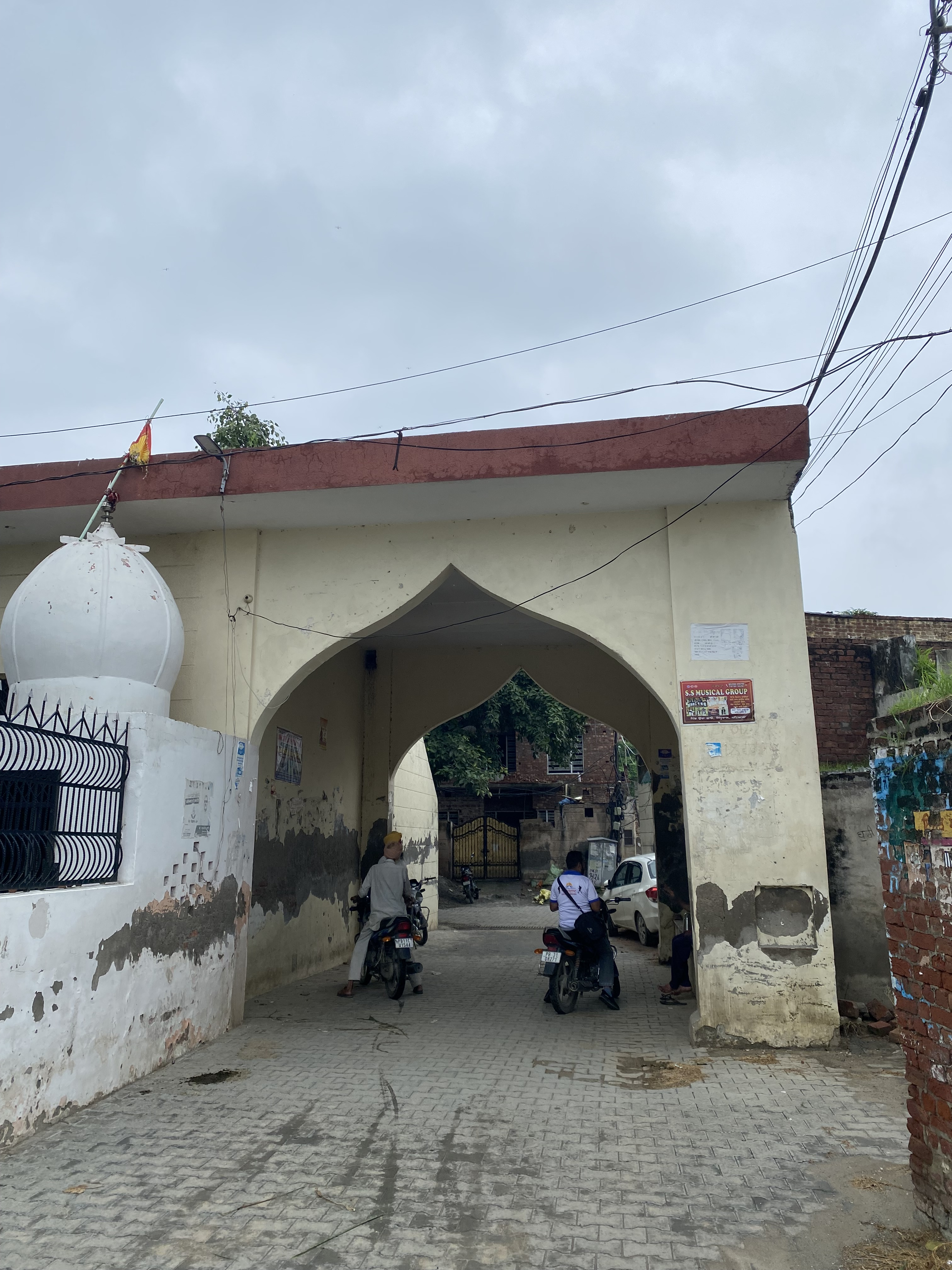
Village Gate, Sidhuwal

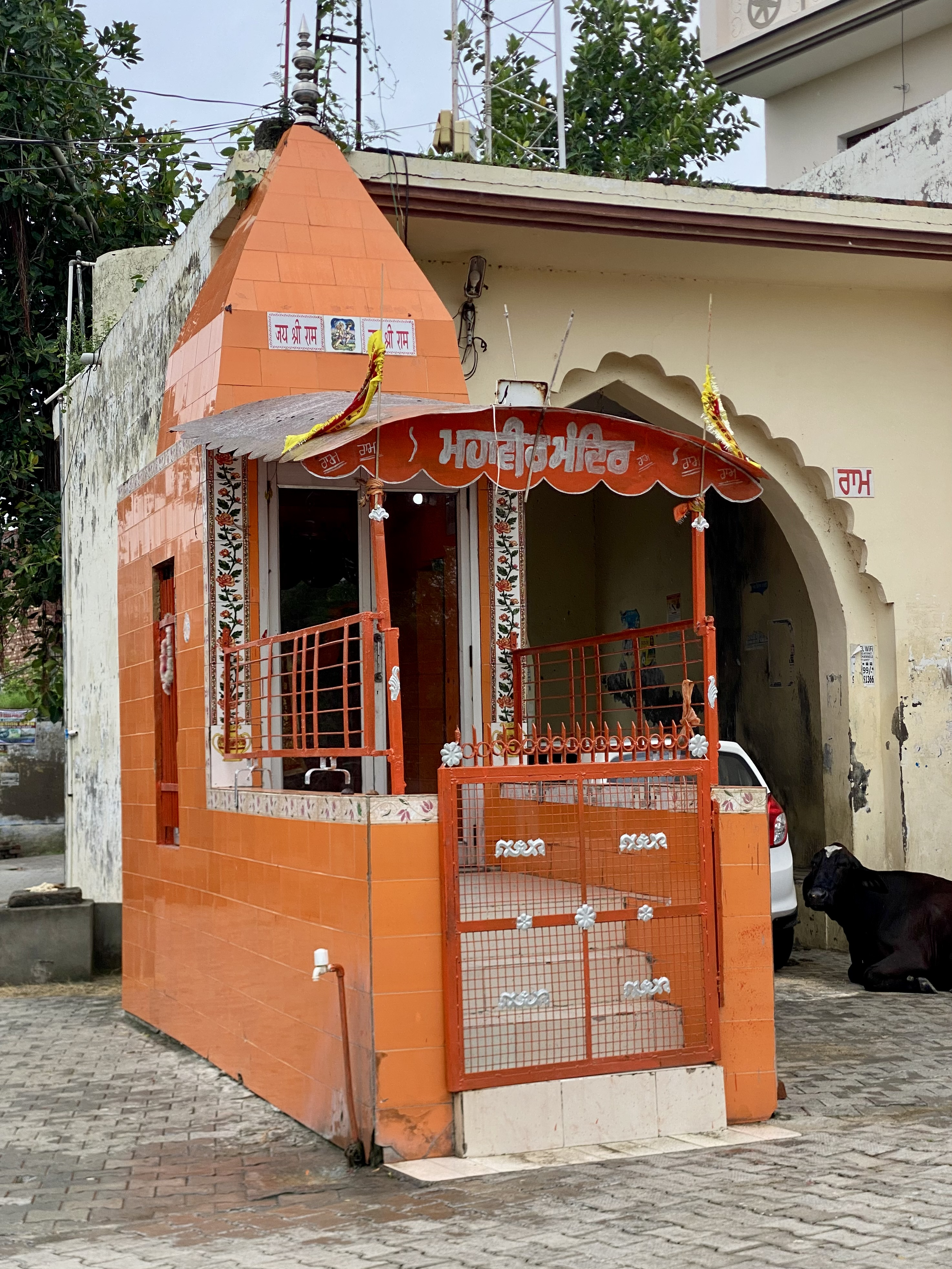
Mahaveer Temple, Sidhuwal

Residents of the village are mostly farmers with very few other jobs including government jobs. The main source of irrigation is groundwater through pumps, canal water and rainfall. Earlier farmers used to grow wheat, sugarcane, cotton, pulses, peanuts, etc. Now, with availability of machinery and knowledge, farmers normally stick to wheat and rice cultivation. Other products grown earlier are minuscule. This has led to the large-scale use of groundwater. Now the level of groundwater has reduced to 50–70 meters.

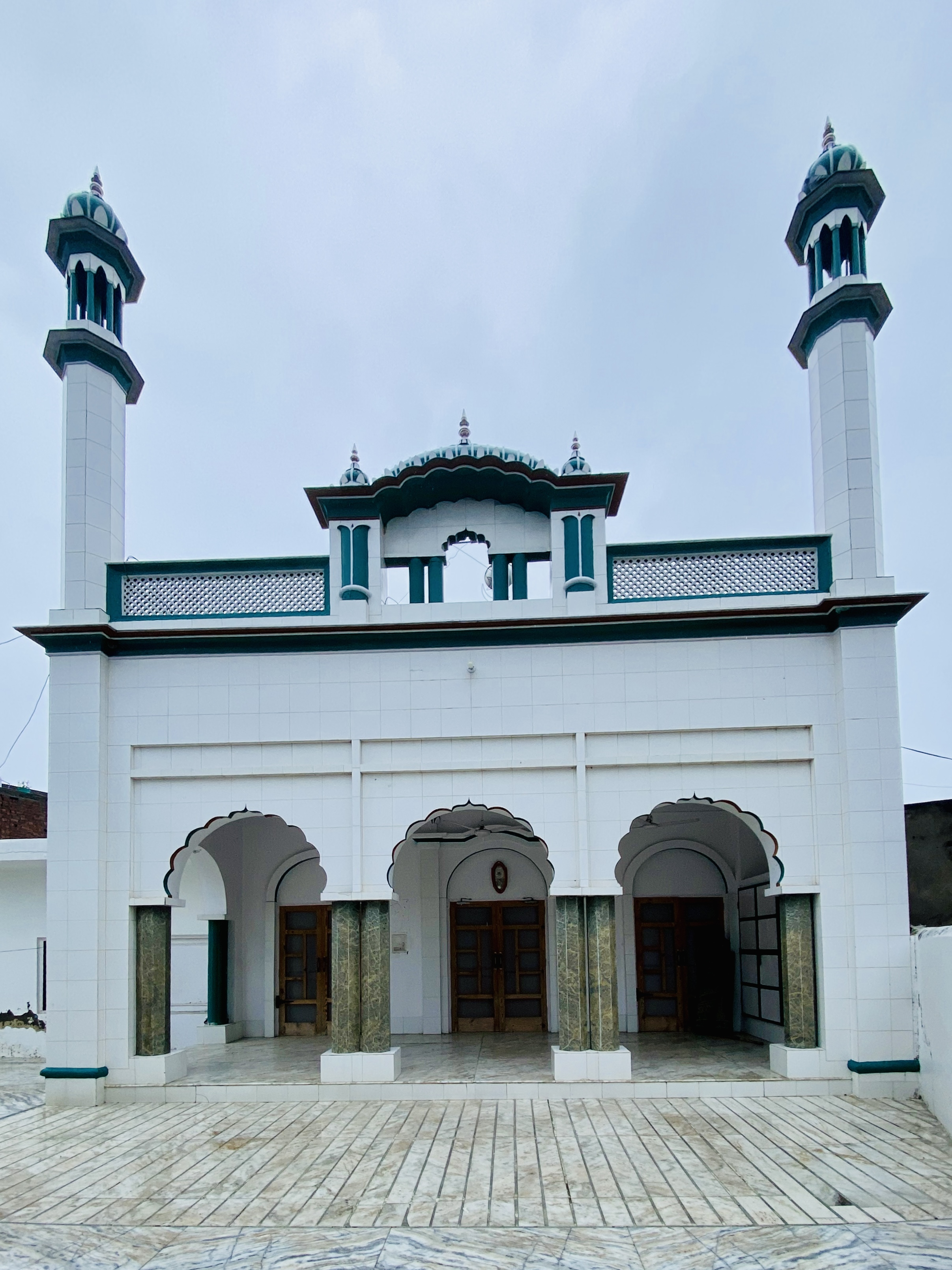
Mosque, Sidhuwal
