= Mohamed Al-Sindi =

Yemeni lawyer and diplomat (born 1952)

His Excellency Mohamed Al-Sindi

Ambassador of Yemen to the United Nations
- In office June 1, 1998 – August 1, 2001
- President: Ali Abdullah Saleh
- Prime Minister: Abd Al-Karim Al-Iryani; Abdul Qadir Bajamal

Deputy Permanent Representative of Yemen to the United Nations
- In office June 1, 1998 – August 1, 2001
- President: Ali Abdullah Saleh
- Prime Minister: Abd Al-Karim Al-Iryani; Abdul Qadir Bajamal
- Preceded by: Ahmed Ali Kalaz
- Succeeded by: Abdullah Ali Fadhel Al-Saadi

Chief of Protocol of Yemen
- In office January 1, 1994 – January 1, 1998
- President: Ali Abdullah Saleh
- Prime Minister: Muhammad Said al-Attar; Abdul Aziz Abdul Ghani; Faraj Said Bin Ghanem

Member of the UNICEF Executive Board for the Asian Group
- In office January 19, 1998 – January 19, 2001
- Deputy: Walid Al-Ethary

Representative of the Arab Center for Strategic Studies to the United Nations
- Incumbent
- Assumed office June 1, 2010
- President: Ali Nasser Mohammed
- Preceded by: Inaugural holder

Personal details
- Born: Mohamed Abdo Al-Sindi; April 4, 1952 (age 74) Colony of Aden (now Aden, Yemen)
- Party: Independent
- Spouse: Asia A. Al-Sindi
- Children: 5
- Education: International Institute of Human Rights; École nationale d'administration University of Aden; University of Paris; United Nations Institute for Training and Research; Columbia University
- Profession: Lawyer; Diplomat

Mohamed Abdo Al-Sindi (born April 4, 1952) is a Yemeni lawyer and diplomat who served as the Ambassador and Deputy Permanent Representative of Yemen to the United Nations from 1998 to 2001, and the Chief of Protocol of Yemen from 1994 to 1998. He is currently the Representative of the Arab Center for Strategic Studies to the United Nations, serving since 2001.

== Early life and education ==
Mohamed Abdo Al-Sindi was born on April 4, 1952, in the British Colony of Aden (now Aden, Yemen). Al-Sindi earned his law degree at the University of Aden and his international relations certificate at École nationale d'administration. He is also a graduate of the International Institute of Human Rights, University of Paris, United Nations Institute for Training and Research, and Columbia University.

== Diplomatic career ==
From 1987 to 1990 Al-Sindi was a Counselor at the Embassy of Yemen in France; from 1990 to 1994 he was Minister Plenipotentiary at the Embassy of Yemen in the Netherlands. From 1994 to 1998 he was the Chief of Protocol of Yemen, serving as the principal authority on national and international diplomatic protocol in Yemen. He was appointed the Ambassador and Deputy Permanent Representative of Yemen to the United Nations in 1998, serving until 2002. As one of Yemen's foremost diplomats, Al-Sindi advocated for multilateral solutions to humanitarian, social, and global health issues. Al-Sindi was an advisor to the Millennium Summit. He was elected to a position on 2001 five-person executive board of UNICEF, where he represented the Asian Group.

== Academic career ==
Since 2001, Al-Sindi is the Representative of the Arab Center for Strategic Studies, the UN-partnered think-tank of President Ali Nasir Muhammad, to the United Nations. Among other accolades, he has been chosen as an Honorary Member of Sigma Xi.

== Personal life ==
He and his wife Asia A. Al-Sindi reside in Fairview, Bergen County, New Jersey. They have three boys and two girls.

Diplomatic posts
Preceded by Ahmed Ali Kalaz	Deputy Permanent Representative of Yemen to the United Nations; 1998–2001	Succeeded by Abdullah Ali Fadhel Al-Saadi
Political offices
Preceded by ??	Chief of Protocol of Yemen; 1994 – 1998	Next: ??
Non-profit organization positions
New title	Representative of the Arab Center for Strategic Studies to the United Nations; 2002 – present	Incumbent
