= MrMed =

Online pharmacy

- Type: Private
- Industry: Healthcare; E-commerce
- Founded: 2020
- Founder: Saurab Jain; Devashish Singh
- Headquarters: Chennai, India
- Area served: India
- Key people: Devashish Singh (Co-Founder & CEO); Saurab Jain (Co-Founder & CBO)
- Revenue: ▲₹16 crore (US$1.7 million) (2023)
- Number of employees: 66

MrMed is an online pharmacy for super-specialty medicines based in India. It was founded by Devashish Singh and Saurab Jain and has its headquarters in Chennai. In 2022, the company received an award from the Government of Tamil Nadu for its contributions to healthcare. Eazymed Technologies Private Limited is listed in the NASSCOM member directory.

== History ==
MrMed was conceived in August 2020 when Devashish Singh and Saurab Jain noticed challenges in specialty medicines. Despite facing initial setbacks due to the COVID Delta wave in India, which prompted the founders and their team to prioritize community assistance, MrMed was officially launched in June 2021. The company launched its mobile app in March 2023 for access to speciality medicines for conditions such as cancer, transplants, kidney, or liver diseases. It also raised $500,000 in funding from the Tamil Nadu Emerging Sector Seed Fund (TNESSF) and angel investors.

On 8 December 2025, the company announced a strategic partnership with the American multinational pharmaceutical company Eli Lilly to support the distribution of specialty medicines in India. In June 2026, MrMed launched Care for the Caregiver, a programme for caregivers of people with cancer, rare diseases and those undergoing or recovering from organ transplantation.

== Operations ==
MrMed's headquarters are in Chennai, with dispatch hubs located in Delhi and Bangalore. According to the Economic Times, the company reported an Annual Recurring Revenue (ARR) of ₹26 crore. In April 2024, the company entered the offline retail segment with the opening of its first store in Chennai.

== Awards and recognition ==
In 2022, MrMed was awarded the Health Care Start-up Of The Year by the Federation of Indian Chambers of Commerce and Industry (FICCI) in Chennai, presented by Ma. Subramanian, the Minister for Health and Family Welfare, Government of Tamil Nadu. In August 2026, the company was selected as one of 20 AI-focused startups for Google Play's 2026 India Accelerator cohort.

== See also ==
- Pharmaceutical industry in India
- Healthcare in Chennai
