= Indus (1813 ship) =

History

United Kingdom
- Name: Indus
- Builder: Henry & William Wright, North Shore, Newcastle-upon-Tyne
- Launched: 1813
- Fate: Abandoned on the Dogger Bank 8 January 1839

General characteristics
- Tons burthen: 397 (bm)
- Length: 104 ft 9 in (31.9 m)
- Beam: 29 ft 3 in (8.9 m)
- Armament: 4 guns (1814)

Indus was launched in 1813 at Newcastle-upon-Tyne. She initially traded as a West Indiaman. In 1820–1821 she probably made one voyage carrying cargo from Batavia, Dutch East Indies, to Hamburg and Antwerp. After the probable voyage to Batavia Indus traded between Liverpool and Canada. The cargo that Indus carried from Canada back to Liverpool consisted mainly of lumber, including staves. Her surviving crew members abandoned Indus on 8 January 1839 after she became waterlogged.

== Career ==
Henry Wright, South Shields and William Wright, Newcastle, built Indus for their own account.

Indus first appeared in Lloyd's Register (LR) in 1814.

Year	Master	Owner	Trade	Source & notes
1814	Callender	Clark & Co.	London–Jamaica	LR
1815	Callender	Clark & Co.	London–New York	LR
1816	Callender	Wright & Co.	London–Jamaica	LR
1820	Callender	Wright & Co.	London–Quebec	LR

The Registers were only as accurate as owners choose to keep them. Between 1820 and 1822 two vessels named Indus, one with Jackson, master, and one with Wright, master, sailed to Batavia from Newcastle. Neither combination appears in Lloyd's Register or the Register of Shipping. However, the ship arrival and departure data also does not show any data for Indus, Callender, master. Indus, Wright, master, sailed via Saint Helena on both her out bound and return voyages. She stopped at Portsmouth on 20 July 1821 on her way back from Batavia, and was put into quarantine. Her crew was sickly and she had lost nine men to fever and other contagious diseases. On 25 July she went on to Antwerp. By discharging her cargo in Antwerp she was not in violation of the British East India Company's monopoly on trade between Great Britain and ports east of the Cape of Good Hope.

Year	Master	Owner	Trade	Source & notes
1824	Callender; Malabara	Wright & Co.	London–Quebec	LR
1827	Malabara	Wright & Co.	Liverpool–Cronstadt	LR
1829	Malabara; Rodgers	Wright & Co.	Liverpool–"Mrmic"	LR
1830	W.Rodgers	Wright & Co.	Liverpool–Quebec	LR
1831	W.Rodgers	Wright & Co.	London	LR
1832	W.Rodgers; J.Carey; Hunter	Wright & Co.	Liverpool–Quebec	LR; small repairs 1832
1833	T.Hunter	Wright & Co.	Liverpool–"Mrmc"	LR; small repairs 1832
1835	T.Hunter; T.Wright	H.Wright	Liverpool–Quebec	LR
1838	T.Wright	H.Wright	Liverpool–Quebec	LR

== Fate ==
Her crew abandoned Indus on 8 January 1839 on the Dogger Bank in the North Sea off the coast of Jutland. She was waterlogged and Felicity rescued four surviving crew, the remainder being dead. Indus was on a voyage from Quebec City, to Newcastle upon Tyne. Two days later her crew and the survivors abandoned Felicity, of Rochester, which now too was in a sinking state. Lydia, of Aberdeen rescued the survivors and brought them into Hartlepool on 17 January.
