= Sidhu Mutsadi =

Sidham Mustadi Sidhma Tal walia
- Village
- Location in Punjab, India Sidham Mustadi (India)
- Coordinates: 31.1122631°N 75.6046552°E
- Country: India
- State: Punjab
- District: Jalandhar

Government
  - Type: Panchayat raj
  - Body: Gram panchayat
- Elevation: 240 m (790 ft)

Population (2011)
  - Total: 1,319
- Sex ratio 882/627 ♂/♀

Languages
  - Official: Punjabi
- Time zone: UTC+5:30 (IST)
- PIN: 144039
- ISO 3166 code: IN-PB
- Website: jalandhar.nic.in

Sidham Mutsadi is a village in Jalandhar district of Punjab State, India. It is located 3.7 km from Nurmahal, 23.7 km from Phillaur, 29 km from district headquarter Jalandhar and 134 km from state capital Chandigarh. The village is administrated by a sarpanch who is an elected representative of village as per Panchayati raj (India).

== Transport ==
Nurmahal railway station is the nearest train station; however, Phillaur Junction train station is 23 km away from the village. The village is 52 km away from domestic airport in Ludhiana and the nearest international airport is located in Chandigarh also Sri Guru Ram Dass Jee International Airport is the second nearest airport which is 121 km away in Amritsar.
