= Hindoo (disambiguation) =

Hindoo is an archaic spelling of Hindu and one whose use today may be considered derogatory.

Hindoo may also refer to:

- Hindoo (horse), a racehorse
- Hindoo style, a Western style of architecture in which Indian motifs are used
- Hindoo, a Norwegian bark wrecked and beached on Dog Island, Florida

== See also ==
- Hindoo Stuart (1758–1828), officer in the East India Company Army
- Hindu (disambiguation)
