= Ali Sindi =

Iraqi politician

Dr. Ali Sindi (Kurdish: د. علی سندی) is an Iraqi Kurdish politician and Minister for Planning for the Kurdistan Regional Government. He graduated from University of Mosul (BA), Salahaddin University-Erbil (MA), and Harvard Kennedy School (MPA).
