= Indus Air =

Indian regional airline

IATA	ICAO	Call sign
—	ACY	—
- Commenced operations: 2006; 20 years ago
- Ceased operations: 2007; 19 years ago
- Hubs: Delhi
- Fleet size: 2
- Destinations: 4
- Headquarters: Ghaziabad, India
- Key people: Krishnan Gopal Beri (Director), Kapil Aggarwal, Sundeep Sehgal, Gaurav Ajmani

Indus Air was a regional domestic airline based in Ghaziabad, India. Its main base was Indira Gandhi International Airport, Delhi.

== History ==
In October 2005, it was reported that Baron Kapil Mohan of Mohan Meakin, along with other Indian businessmen, had invested in Indus Airways. They planned to start services by the end of October 2005, using two Bombardier CRJ-200 aircraft leased from Lufthansa. These two CRJ-200LRs were ex Independence Air aircraft from the USA.

Indus Air was established in 2004 and started operations on 14 December 2006. It ceased operations in April 2007, three months after it began operations.

== Destinations ==
Indus Air operated domestic services to the following destinations:

- Amritsar
- Chandigarh
- Delhi
- Mumbai

== Fleet ==
The Indus Air fleet included the following aircraft:

- 2 Bombardier CRJ-200ER
