= Indus (1817 ship) =

History

United States
- Name: Indus
- Owner: Pickering Dodge & Co.Salem, Massachusetts,
- Launched: 1817, (Note: Two sources gives a launch year of 1814.) Newbury, Massachusetts
- Fate: Probably wrecked 24 September 1829; last listed in 1833

General characteristics
- Tons burthen: 262, or 265, or 291 (bm)
- Length: 90 ft 1 in (27.46 m)
- Beam: 25 ft 10 in (7.87 m)
- Depth: 12 ft 11 in (3.94 m)
- Sail plan: Brigantine, or Brig

Indus was launched in Newburyport, Massachusetts in 1817, or Newbury, Massachusetts in 1814. She first appeared in the British registries in 1823. Throughout her career she remained owned in the United States, and sailing under the United States flag. She may have briefly traded between Great Britain and Batavia, Dutch East Indies, sailing under a licence from the British East India Company. Thereafter, she sailed between Liverpool and New York. She was probably the Indus wrecked on 24 September 1829; she was last listed in 1833.

== Career ==
Indus first appeared in Lloyd's Register (LR) in 1823.

Year	Master	Owner	Trade	Source
1823	John Day	P.Dodge	Cowes	LR
1825	J.Day	P.Dodge	Cowes	LR

In 1813 the EIC had lost its monopoly on the trade between India and Britain. British ships were then free to sail to India or the Indian Ocean under a licence from the EIC. Although Indus was American-owned, and sailing under the United States flag, if she wanted to trade between India or South East Asia on the one hand, and Britain on the other, she needed a licence.

On 6 October 1822 Indus. Day, master, arrived at Cowes after a voyage of 126 days from Batavia, Dutch East Indies. She immediately sailed on to Hamburg and then Antwerp. From Antwerp she sailed again to Batavia. By trading between Batavia and Europe, and not between Batavia and Britain, Indus avoided either violating the EIC monopoly on such trade, or the need for a licence from the EIC.

LR reported that on 16 March 1825 Indus sailed to China under a licence from the EIC. However, ship arrival and departure data in Lloyd's List showed Indus trading between Cowes, Antwerp, Batavia, and The Netherlands.

Year	Master	Owner	Trade	Source
1826	Moriarty; Myrick	P.Dodge	Cowes–Antwerp	LR
1827	Moriarty; Reed	P.Dodge	Liverpool-New York	LR

== Fate ==
On 24 November 1829 Indus, Rock, master, was wrecked on the Newcombe Sand, in the English Channel off the coast of Sussex with the loss of all hands. She was on a voyage from Liverpool to Bremen.

Indus was last listed in 1833 with no change from 1827.
