= USS Indus =

Cargo ship of the United States Navy

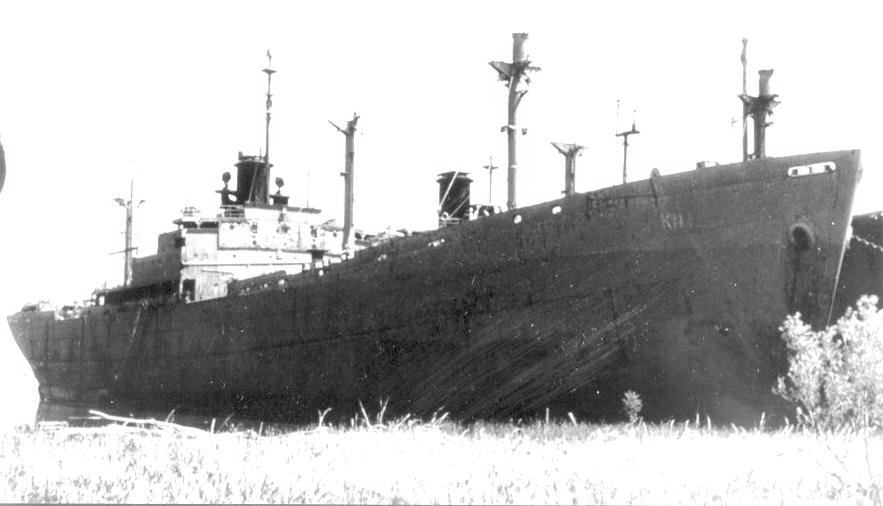
- USS Indus (AKN-1)

History

United States
- Name: USS Indus (AKN-1)
- Namesake: Indus
- Builder: Bethlehem-Fairfield Shipyard
- Laid down: 4 October 1943
- Launched: 29 October 1943
- Acquired: 5 November 1943
- Commissioned: 15 February 1944
- Decommissioned: 20 May 1946
- Honors and awards: One battle star
- Fate: Scrapped 1967

General characteristics
- Displacement: 4,023 tons (light)
- Length: 441 ft 6 in (134.57 m)
- Beam: 56 ft 11 in (17.35 m)
- Draft: 28 ft 4 in (8.64 m)
- Speed: 11 knots
- Complement: 228
- Armament: 1 x 5 in (130 mm), 4 x 40 mm

USS Indus (AKN-1) was the lead ship of the Indus-class of converted Liberty ship net cargo ships in the service of the United States Navy in World War II. Named after the constellation Indus, it was the only ship of the Navy to bear this name.

Indus was laid down 4 October 1943 as liberty ship SS Theodore Roosevelt (MCE hull 1814) by Bethlehem-Fairfield Shipyard, Baltimore, Maryland, under a Maritime Commission contract; launched 29 October 1943; sponsored by Mrs. William MacMillan, granddaughter of President Theodore Roosevelt; acquired by the Navy 5 November 1943; converted at the Maryland Drydock Company; and renamed Indus. She commissioned 15 February 1944.

After the installation of additional equipment at Norfolk, the net cargo ship conducted shakedown in the Chesapeake Bay until 14 March 1944. She sailed from Norfolk 1 April for the Pacific theater, via the Canal Zone, and arrived Espiritu Santo 12 May 1944. Her first assignment was the installation of nets in Seeadler Harbor, and she arrived there 1 June 1944 to direct and support the work of net-laying ships. With these important anti-torpedo nets completed, the ship departed 29 July to load gear at Milne Bay, New Guinea, arriving Mios Woendi to install nets 30 August. Indus then returned to Milne Bay 27 September, and soon afterward became flagship for Commander 7th Fleet Service Forces during the Leyte operation. She sailed 12 October for Hollandia and arrived Leyte Gulf 24 October to support that vital operation. The versatile ship issued stores and did repair work during this period, and during the numerous air raids shot down at least two Japanese aircraft. She departed 6 December for Hollandia where she loaded additional gear and provisions.

As the next major assault in the Philippines, the Lingayen Gulf operation, began to take shape at staging bases, Indus joined the service group and departed 28 December for the landing. Although the Japanese made desperate air attacks on the convoy, sinking some ships but suffering heavy losses themselves, the fleet resolutely drove through to its objective. Indus arrived safely at the assault area 9 January 1945 and performed service duties during the initial landing stages. Departing 23 February, the ship sailed to the recaptured base at Subic Bay and on 28 February began to establish net defenses. She continued this vital work until departing 11 May for Hollandia, where she arrived two days later.

Indus returned to the Manila Bay area 24 May to unload supplies, then sailed 1 June for Pearl Harbor. She remained there until 30 June, when she sailed with net gear for Eniwetok Atoll, for work on the net defenses there. The veteran ship returned to Pearl Harbor in August, and was in port when the surrender of Japan was announced. She subsequently carried cargo and did net work at Eniwetok, Saipan, and Kwajalein until the end of 1945. She returned to Norfolk 14 March 1946, via the Panama Canal, decommissioned at Norfolk 20 May 1946, and was returned to the Maritime Commission 3 days later. Placed in the National Defense Reserve Fleet under her old name, she was berthed at Wilmington, North Carolina until she was scrapped in 1967.

Indus received one battle star for World War II service.
