= SS Indus =

A number of steamships have been named Indus, including:-

- SS Indus (1866), in service with Nourse Line 1866–73
- SS Indus (1877), of 1,907 GRT, built by CS Swan&Co., Wallsend, for the Mercantile Steam Ship Company. Stranded and wrecked January 1883.
- SS Indus (1881), of 3,462 GRT, was launched for the Peninsular and Oriental Steam Navigation Company. She sank in 1885.
- SS Indus (1904), the first steamship built for the Nourse Line, in service until captured and sunk in 1914
- SS Indus (1940), in service with Nourse Line 1940–42, sunk by German raider Thor
- SS Indus (1945), launched as Sasbeck, served with C H Abrahamsen, Stockholm as Indus from 1950–68
- SS Indus (1954), in service with Nourse Line 1954–69, when sold to Panama

For merchant vessels of the Age of Sail see: Indus (ship)
