= Native =

Native may refer to:

== People ==
- Jus sanguinis, nationality by blood
- Jus soli, nationality by location of birth
- Indigenous peoples, peoples with a set of specific rights based on their historical ties to a particular territory
  - Native Americans (disambiguation)

== In arts and entertainment ==
- Native (band), a French R&B band
- Native (character), a character in the X-Men comics universe
- Native (album), a 2013 album by OneRepublic
- Native (2016 film), a British science fiction film
- The Native, a Nigerian music magazine

== In science ==
- Native (computing), software or data formats supported by a certain system
- Native language, the language(s) a person has learned from birth
- Native metal, any metal that is found in its metallic form, either pure or as an alloy, in nature
- Native species, a species whose presence in a region is the result of only natural processes
- List of Australian plants termed "native", whose common name is of the form "native . . ."

== Other uses ==
- Northeast Arizona Technological Institute of Vocational Education (NATIVE), a technology school district in the Arizona portion of the Navajo Nation

== See also ==
- Aboriginal (disambiguation)
- Autochthon (disambiguation)
- Indigenous (disambiguation)
- Nativism (disambiguation)
- Nativity (disambiguation)
