= Aboriginal =

Aboriginal, Aborigine, aboriginals, or aborigines may refer to:

- Indigenous peoples, general term for ethnic groups who are the earliest known inhabitants of an area
- One of several specific groups of indigenous peoples (see List of indigenous peoples), especially:
  - Aboriginal Australians, historically also known as Aborigines, terminology which many now consider offensive
  - Indigenous peoples in Canada, also known as Aboriginal Canadians
  - Orang Asli, historically known as Malayan Aborigines
    - Proto-Malay, also known as Aboriginal Malays, a subgroup of the Orang Asli
  - Taiwanese indigenous peoples, sometimes called Taiwanese aborigines or Taiwanese aboriginals
- Aboriginal language
- Aborigines (mythology), the oldest inhabitants of central Italy in Roman mythology
- ab-Original: Journal of Indigenous Studies and First Nations and First Peoples' Cultures, a scholarly journal published by Penn State University Press
- A.B. Original, an Australian hip hop duo formed in 2016

== See also ==
Synonyms and related terms and concepts

- Autochthon (disambiguation)
- First Nations (disambiguation)
- Indian (disambiguation)
- Indigenous (disambiguation)
- Native (disambiguation)
