= Indigenous =

Indigenous may refer to:

- Indigenous peoples
- Indigenous (ecology), presence in a region as the result of only natural processes, with no human intervention
- Indigenous (band), an American blues-rock band
- Indigenous (horse), a Hong Kong racehorse
- Indigenous (film), Australian, 2016

== See also ==
- BIPOC, acronym referring to "Black, Indigenous, (and) people of color"
- Indigenous language
- Indigenous religion
- Indigenism, several different ideologies associated with Indigenous peoples
- Indigenismo, Latin American political ideology
- Missing and Murdered Indigenous Women
- Aboriginal (disambiguation)
- Autochthon (disambiguation)
- First Nations (disambiguation)
- Native (disambiguation)
