= Dietmar Rothermund =

German historian (1933–2020)

Dietmar Otto Ernst Rothermund (20 January 1933 in Kassel – 9 March 2020 in Dossenheim) was a German historian and professor of the history of South Asia at the Ruprecht-Karls University in Heidelberg. He is considered an important representative of modern German historical scholarship. Although he began his academic career as an Americanist, he eventually became a notable figure in the German historiography of South Asia. He helped to lay the foundations for South Asian Studies in Germany and Europe.

== Childhood and youth ==
Dietmar Rothermund was interested in India and its culture from an early age on. He read the early Indian philosophical Upanishad texts at a young age and made a map of India's most important temples while still at school. A few years before his Abitur, Rothermund wrote a letter to Jawaharlal Nehru, the then Prime Minister of India. Even as a child, he had enthusiastically read Nehru's autobiography. In 1929, Nehru, as president of the Indian National Congress, complained that the Congress had so far been able to make cultural progress but no social progress. Referring to this, Rothermund formulated his question as to whether this had been achieved under his leadership after Indian independence. The letter remained unanswered and even at a personal meeting a few years later, Nehru did not give him any information.

== Academic career ==
Rothermund studied history and philosophy in Marburg, Munich and Philadelphia. He received his doctorate in the US in 1959 with a thesis on US social history. With the help of a Fulbright scholarship, he was able to study in Pennsylvania and write his dissertation there at the age of 26, entitled: The Layman's Progress. Religious and Political Experience in Colonial Pennsylvania. 1740-1770. It dealt with the "growing politicisation of denominational groups in Pennsylvania in the late colonial period and in the run-up to American independence". It gained a great deal of attention in the USA and England up to the present day. Not for nothing was it published by Oxford University Press in 1962 and Cambridge University Press in 1963. Between 1961 and 2020, a total of 17 editions were published at the University of Pennsylvania. In 1963 Rothermund became a research assistant to the Chair of History at the South Asia Institute in Heidelberg. Shortly after his habilitation The Land and the Law in India, 1875-1900, in 1968, he was appointed Chair of the History of South Asia at the South Asia Institute. At that time, this was the only professorship of Modern History of South Asia in the Federal Republic of Germany. He held the professorship until his retirement in 2001 and was the executive director of the South Asia Institute for a total of 15 years.

== Research and focal points ==
=== Passage to India 1960–1963 ===
Through his successful dissertation, Rothermund seemed to be on the direct path to becoming a specialist in American history, but thanks to a grant from the German Research Foundation (GRF), which allowed him to spend three years in India, Rothermund decided to devote his research to South Asia. He arrived in Bombay (today's Mumbai) on a freighter in mid-January 1960 and was immediately impressed by the diverse culture of South Asia. In the very first year, he gave a lecture at the Indian History Congress at Aligarh University on the Indian Non-Cooperation Movement against Indian colonial rule.

The actual end of his three-year stay is probably Rothermund's last publication My Encounters in India. He established some contacts with research colleagues in the Indian National Archives and reports in his last publication on encounters with 135 Indian political, cultural and scientific personalities since 1961, including Jawaharlal Nehru, Manmohan Singh and Indira Gandhi. Shortly after his stay in India, Rothermund visited the National University of Australia as a visiting fellow in 1963.

=== Relationship between India and the Soviet Union ===
Rothermund summarised his research regarding the relationship between India and the Soviet Union in a short monographic study entitled India and the Soviet Union, which addressed the Soviet development aid, mutual trade relations, the China-India-Soviet triangular relationship, the relationship of Indian communists in Moscow and the stability of India and Pakistan.

=== Economic history ===
Economic history gripped Rothermund between the early 1980s and the 1990s. As this topic was one of the main focuses of Rothermund's research, he wrote several monographs and anthologies on it. Including An Economic History of India. From Pre-colonial Times to 1986.

The book India: The Rise of an Asian Giant, was culmination of his studies in this field. In this monograph, Rothermund describes India's enormous economic and political potential and proves this on the basis of India's "stable democracy" and its highly motivated middle class.

==== Agricultural system of India in colonial times ====
In the course of his habilitation, Rothermund dealt with India's agricultural system in colonial times. In 1978, barely ten years after his habilitation, he published his monograph Government, Landlord and Peasant in India. Agrarian Relations under British Rule, 1865-1935, which strengthened his international reputation.

==== Study on the global economic crisis ====
Rothermund's work The Global Impact of the Great Depression 1929-1939, describes his studies of the Great Depression, with chapters on China, Southeast Asia and Latin America. With India in the Great Depression, Rothermund focused on the impact of the economic crisis on India and its inhabitants.

=== Introduction and overview texts on the history of India ===
With History of India, Rothermund, together with his colleague Hermann Kulke, created standard work, which has been translated into Italian, Turkish, Romanian and Chinese. First published in German in 1982, the work was translated into English in 1986 and became very successful in both languages. Many more editions were to follow, including, for example, Geschichte Indiens. Von der Induskultur bis heute (engl. History of India. From the Indus Culture to the Present), or Geschichte Indiens. Vom Mittelalter bis zur Gegenwart (engl. History of India. From the Middle Ages to the Present).

=== Assessments of contemporary India ===
India's contemporary history was also part of Rothermund's multifaceted studies. In 1996, he published the volume Liberalising India. Progress and Problems, which was based on a conference he organised at the Nehru Memorial Library in Delhi, attended by many senior Indian government officials. His monograph on Kashmir Rothermund describes the development of the conflict between India and Pakistan from the beginning through the partition of British India in 1947 and the impact of contemporary events such as 9/11.

=== Indo-German cultural relations ===
Dietmar Rothermund was extremely keen on strengthening and consolidating the relationship between India and Germany. This was reflected in his publications which includes Rabindranath Tragore in Germany, where he captures the euphoria of the 1920s in Germany for India, which arose through the visits of the great Bengali and Gandhian Rabindranath Tragore. Furthermore, his biography on Mahatma Gandhi and his India Handbook both kept alive the knowledge about India and one of its most important personalities in Germany. The handbook was written by several authors and provides important basic knowledge about modern India.

=== Studies beyond South Asia ===
The historian from Heidelberg did not limit himself to South Asian studies alone, he also focused on topics related to colonial history and Asia in general. One of his works on this field is Asian Trade and European Expansion in the Age of Mercantilism, which can also be subsumed to his research focus on economic history. On the subject of colonial history, he produced the world-historical volume The Routledge Companion to Decolonization in 2006. In this book the decolonisation processes in Africa, Asia, the Caribbean and the Pacific are described in individual chapters, which are presented chronologically and clearly with maps.

=== Criticism ===
Due to the larger audience, Rothermund switched to English quite early when it came to publishing his works. His publications mostly relied exclusively on English sources, which, according to some critics, promoted a pro-government interpretation and ignored indigenous perspectives. For the vast majority, however, this was a loss to be borne, considering the frequency with which he wrote and published.

== Engagement ==
Rothermund's efforts were not limited to Germany alone; he was always engaged at the international level as well. In a national context, it can be argued that Dietmar Rothermund liberated South Asian studies in Germany from the "academic ivory tower".

=== The South-Asia Institute in Heidelberg (SAI) ===
Rothermund had close ties to the South Asia Institute in Heidelberg. Almost his entire academic career took place at the then still young South Asia Institute, which had just been founded by Werner Conze. From 1963, he was a research assistant in the Department of History until 1968, when he was appointed Chair of the History of South Asia. For one third of his 38 years at the SAI, he was Executive Director. Under Rothermund's leadership, the Institute developed rapidly, and shortly after Rothermund's retirement in 2001, the SAI was considered the leading centre for South Asian studies in Germany and also one of the leading institutes in this field worldwide. With Dietmar Rothermund, the Heidelberg South Asia Institute became an important contact point for Indian scientists, diplomats and politicians. The important role Rothermund played for the SAI becomes clear with the joking name of "Dietmar's Institute", which colleagues liked to use frequently.

=== European Association of South Asian Studies (EASAS) ===
The EASAS emerged from a small conference organised by the Heidelberg South Asia Institute in Bad Herrenalb in 1966. The first official meeting of the European Conference of Modern South Asian Studies took place in Cambridge in 1968. The conference rotated every two years between different European research centres, so in 1972 the third conference was held for the first time at the South Asia Institute in Heidelberg. With Rothermund as its founding father and long-time chairman (1997-2006), EASAS developed into one of the most important European associations of its kind. In 2001, on the occasion of Rothermund's retirement, the 17th conference was held in Heidelberg with over 250 international participants. The regularly held meetings gave Europe a significant position for South Asian studies worldwide.

=== Arbeitskreis außereuropäischer Geschichte ===
At the "Historikertag" (engl. Historians' Conference) in Würzburg in 1980, Dietmar Rothermund gathered a small group of like-minded people who wanted to try to bring "non-European topics" more into the focus of German historical scholarship. Rothermund saw this as his goal in the 1980s/90s. Since the first meeting in Würzburg in 1980, the "Arbeitskreis außereuropäischer Geschichte" (AAG) (engl. Working Group on Non-European History) met regularly during the Historikertage. At the Historikertag in Berlin in 1984, Rothermund was elected Chairman of the Working Group, which he managed for many years. In October 1988, the German Historians' Congress decided at its 37th session that non-European history should become a major topic in German historical scholarship. At the Historikertag in Aachen in 2000, Rothermund achieved official recognition of the AAG by German historians. A priority programme established by the German Research Foundation (DFG) was decisive for this, entitled Transformations of Non-European Expansion from the 15th to the 20th Century. Cultural interaction between European and non-European societies in the Age of Expansion. These developments resulted in the Periplus. Jahrbuch außereuropäischer Geschichte, which addressed colonial history and the history of the world outside the West.

=== The Heidelberger Südasiengespräche ===
The "Heidelberger Südasiengespräche" (engl. Heidelberg South Asia Talks), which have been held in the surroundings of the Heidelberg South Asia Institute since 1991, were initiated directly by Dietmar Rothermund, who also co-organised them until his retirement. With the talks, he offered a forum for exchange between academia, business and representatives of politics and public life. The SAI wanted to make its contribution to the discussion and shaping of the cooperation between the Federal Republic of Germany and the countries of South Asia. The internal development of these countries and their position in the international context were part of the analysis of current problems and the attempt to point out longer-term perspectives. Thus the topics of discussion (as of 30.06. 2000) were "India" (1990), "Pakistan" (1991), "Bangladesh" (1992), "Nepal and the Himalayan Region" (1933), "Sri Lanka" (1994), "German Cooperation with South Asia" (1995), "Food Security in South Asia" (1996), "50 Years of Independent South Asia: Awakening, Change, Future Prospects" (1997) and "The Southeast Asian Economic Crisis - Diagnoses, Therapies and Implications for South Asia" (1998).

=== Cultural exchange ===
The cultural exchange between Germany and South Asia was of great importance for Dietmar Rothermund. For decades, he was considered the number one contact person when Indian politicians visited Germany. He also frequently accompanied German ministers and other envoys on their South Asian tours. For this commitment and many other activities, Dietmar Rothermund was awarded the "Verdienstkreuz erster Klasse" (engl. Federal Cross of Merit 1st Class) in October 2011. Rothermund was also available for interviews on radio and television at any time, even though he very much regretted that he was only interviewed on the occasion of crises and disasters. In connection with his commitment to cultural exchange, the governmental Indo-German Consultative Group should also be mentioned. Rothermund had been a member of the institution founded by Helmut Kohl at the suggestion of Indian Prime Minister Narasimha Rao since 1992. It was founded to intensify economic contacts between India and Germany.

=== Promotion of young talent ===
Professor Rothermund and his courses were always very popular among the Heidelberg students. Many came from all over the world to write their dissertations under his supervision. Rothermund supervised no fewer than 44 students in their dissertations. Many of his former protégés now hold professorships. In Dietmar Rothermund, the foreign students in particular, had an important comrade-in-arms, because the doctoral regulations at the time stipulated that the dissertation had to be written in German or Latin. Rothermund usually succeeded in making an English dissertation possible, although a special application had to be made for it.

== Recognition ==
- 1988: Fellow of the Royal Historical Society in London
- 1994: Hemchandra Raychaudhury Gold Medal of the Asiatic Society in Kalkutta
- 2011: Order of Merit of the Federal Republic of Germany
- 2011: Indo-German Society's Rabindranath Tagore Cultural Award

== Publications ==
Rothermund's publications are published in his Festschrift, which was edited by, Georg Berkemer, Tilman Frasch, Hermann Kulke and Jürgen Lütt. All works after 2001 are taken from the catalog of the German National Library.

=== Monographs ===
1961

- The Layman’s Progress. Religious and Political Experience in Colonial Pennsylvania. 1740-1770, Philadelphia: Univ. of Philadelphia Press.

1964

- Studien zur Entwicklung in Süd- und Ostasien: Neue Folge, Frankfurt/Main/Berlin (Schriften des Instituts für Asienkunde in Hamburg 16): Metzner.

1965

- Die politische Willensbildung in Indien 1900-1960, Wiesbaden (Schriftenreihe des Südasieninstituts der Universität Heidelberg 1): Harrassowitz.

1967

- Der Freiheitskampf Indiens, 2. Auflage, Stuttgart (Quellen und Arbeitshefte zur Geschichte und Gemeinschaftskunde 4251): Klett.

1968

- Indien und die Sowjetunion, Tübingen (Forschungsberichte und Untersuchungen zur Zeitgeschichte 23): Boehlau.

1970

- The Phases of Indian Nationalism and Other Essays, Bombay: Nachiketa Publications.

1976

- Grundzüge der indischen Geschichte, Darmstadt: Wissenschaftliche Buchgesellschaft.

1978

- Europa und Asien im Zeitalter des Merkantilismus, Darmstadt (Erträge der Forschung 80): Wissenschaftliche Buchgesellschaft.
- Government, Landlord and Peasant in India. Agrarian Relations under British Rule. 1865-1935, Wiesbaden (Schriftenreihe des Südasieninstituts der Universität Heidelberg 25): Steiner.

1979

- Fünfmal Indien, München (3rd rev. ed. München 1990): Piper.

1980

- Indien, Photos: Ursula und Willi Dolder, Text: Dietmar Rothermund, Luzern (2nd ed. Frankfurt am Main 1995): Bucher.

1981

- Asian Trade and European Expansion in the Age of Mercantilism, New Delhi: Manohar.

1982

- Geschichte Indiens (together with Hermann Kulke), Stuttgart (2nd ed. München 1998): Kohlhammer.
- India, Photographs by Ursula and Willi Dolder, Text by Dietmar Rothermund, London: Bucher.
- Indische Geschichte vom Altertum bis zur Gegenwart: Literaturbericht über neuere Veröffentlichungen (together with Hermann Kulke et al.), München (Historische Zeitschrift, Sonderheft 10): Oldenbourg.

1983

- The Indian Economy Under British Rule and Other Essays, New Delhi: Manohar.

1984

- Gebrauchsanweisung für Indien, München: Piper.

1985

- Indiens wirtschaftliche Entwicklung: Von der Kolonialherrschaft bis zur Gegenwart, Paderborn: Schöningh.

1986

- A History of India (together with Hermann Kulke), London/Sidney/Totowa: Barnes & Noble Books.
- The German Intellectual Quest for India, New Delhi: Manohar.

1988

- An Economic History of India. From Pre-colonial Times to 1986. London/New York/New Delhi (2nd ed. 1993): Croom Helm.
- Buchers Indien: Tempel und Legenden, Photos: Jenner Zimmermann, Text: Dietmar Rothermund, München: Bucher.

1989

- Indische Geschichte in Grundzügen, Darmstadt. (1st ed.: Grundzüge der indischen Geschichte, Darmstadt 1976): Wissenschaftliche Buchgesellschaft.
- Mahatma Gandhi. Der Revolutionär der Gewaltlosigkeit. Eine politische Biographie, München 1989. München (2nd ed.: Mahatma Gandhi. Eine politische Biographie, München 1997): Piper.

1991

- Mahatma Gandhi: An Essay in Political Biography, New Delhi (Perspectives in History 5; 2nd ed. 1998): Manohar.
- Storia dell´India (together with Hermann Kulke), trsl. M. Cristiani, Milano: Garzanti.

1992

- Die Welt in der Wirtschaftskrise, 1929-1939, Münster etc. (Periplus Texte 1): Lit.
- India in the Great Depression, 1929-1939, New Delhi (Perspectives in History 6): Manohar.

1993

- An Economic History of India. From Pre-colonial Times to 1991. London (1st ed. 1988): Routledge.
- Staat und Gesellschaft in Indien, Mannheim etc. (Meyers Forum 15): BI-Taschenbuchverlag.

1994

- Geschichte als Prozess und Aussage: Eine Einführung in Theorien des historischen Wandels und der Geschichtsschreibung, München: Oldenbourg.

1996

- The Global Impact of the Great Depression, 1929-1939, London/New York: Routledge.

1997

- A History of India (together with Hermann Kulke), London/New York (1st ed. London/Sydney 1986): Routledge.
- Mahatma Gandhi. Eine politische Biographie, München (Bek’sche Reihe 1218: 1st ed.: Mahatma Gandhi. Der Revolutionär der Gewaltlosigkeit. Eine politische Biographie, München 1989): C.H. Beck.

1998

- Delhi, 15. August 1947. Das Ende kolonialer Herrschaft, München (20 Tage im 20. Jahrhundert): Dt. Taschenbuchverlag.
- Geschichte Indiens. Von der Induskultur bis heute, München (2nd ed.): C.H. Beck.

2000

- Was kann Indien uns lehren, Berlin: Lotos.

2002

- Krisenherd Kaschmir: Der Konflikt der Atommächte Indien und Pakistan, München: C.H. Beck.
- Geschichte Indiens: Vom Mittelalter bis zur Gegenwart, München: C.H. Beck.
- Atommacht Indien: Von der Bündnisfreiheit zur amerikanischen Allianz, Wien: Picus.

2004

- Der indische Ozean: Das afro-asiatische Meer als Kultur- und Wirtschaftsraum, Wien: Promedia.

2006

- The Routledge Companion to Decolonization, London: Routledge.

2008

- Indien: Aufstieg einer asiatischen Weltmacht, München: C.H. Beck.
- India. The Rise of an Asian Giant, London: Yale University Press.

2009

- Quo vadis Asien?: China, Indien, Russland, Mittlerer Osten und Zentralasien im globalen Kontext, Schwalbach am Taunus: Wochenschau-Verlag.

2010

- Gandhi und Nehru: zwei Gesichter Indiens, Stuttgart: Kohlhammer.

2011

- Gandhi: der gewaltlose Revolutionär, München: C.H. Beck.

2015

- Historische Horizonte, Baden-Baden: Nomos.
- Erinnerungskulturen post-imperialer Nationen, Baden-Baden: Nomos.

2016

- Aspects of Indian and Global History: a Collection of Essays, Baden-Baden: Nomos.

2019

- The Industrialization of India, Baden-Baden: Nomos.

2020

- My Encounters in India, Delhi: Primus-Books.

=== Edited works ===
1961

- Rabindranath Tragore in Germany: A Cross-Selection of Contemporary Reports, New Delhi: Max Mueller Bhavan publications.

1969

- Mahatma Gandhi 1869-1969 (together with Eberhard Jäckel et al.), Bonn: Inter Nationes.

1973

- South Asia Institute: The First Decade, 1962-1972 (together with A. K. Ray), Heidelberg (Bulletin of South Asia Institute of Heidelberg University 1973).

1975

- Islam in Southern Asia: A Survey of Current Research, Wiesbaden 1975 (Beiträge zur Südasien-Forschung 16): Steiner.

1978

- Zamindars, Mines and Peasants: Studies in the History of an Indian Coalfield and Its Rural Hinterland (together with D.C. Wadhwa), New Delhi (South Asian Studies 9a and Dhanbad Research Project 1): Manohar.
- Government, Landlord, and Peasant in India : Agrarian Relations under British Rule : 1865-1935. Wiesbaden: Steiner. 1978. ISBN 3-515-02764-5. OCLC 5011680.

1980

- Urban Growth and Rural Stagnation (together with Erhard Kropp and Gunther Dienemann), New Delhi (South Asian Studies 9b; Dhanbad Research Project 2): Manohar.

1983

- Die Peripherie in der Weltwirtschaftskrise: Afrika, Asien und Lateinamerika 1929-1939. Paderborn (Sammlung Schoeningh zur Geschichte und Gegenwart): Schoeningh.

1984

- South Asia Institute: The Second Decade (together with Siegfried Schwertner), Heidelberg (Bulletin of the South Asia Institute of Heidelberg University 1983/84).

1985

- Regionale Tradition in Südasien (Together with Hermann Kulke), Stuttgart (Beiträge zur Südasien-Forschung 104): Steiner.

1986

- Education and the Integration of Ethnic Minorities. Papers presented at a workshop held at Bad Homburg, Germany 3.-6.6. 1984 (together with John Simon), London/New York (A Publication of the International Centre for Ethnic Studies): Pinter.

1990

- Erste Heidelberger Südasiengespräche, Stuttgart (Beiträge zur Südasien-Forschung 135): Steiner.

1991

- Emporia, Commodities and Entrepreneurs in Asian Maritime Trade, C. 1400-1750 (together with Roderich Ptak), Stuttgart (Beiträge zur Südasien-Forschung 141): Steiner.
- Periplus 1991. Jahrbuch für außereuropäische Geschichte 1 (in cooperation with Willi Paul Adams et al.), Münster: Lit.
- Regional Disparities in India: Rural and Industrial Dimensions (together with Suranjit K. Saha), New Delhi (Proceedings of the 10th European Conference on Modern South Asia Studies 2): Manohar.

1992

- Nationalstaat und Sprachkonflikte in Süd- und Südostasien (together with Dagmar Hellmann-Rajanayagam), Stuttgart (Beiträge zur Südasien-Forschung 149): Steiner.
- Periplus 1992. Jahrbuch für außereuropäische Geschichte 2 (in cooperation with Willi Paul Adams et al.), Münster: Lit.

1993

- Periplus 1993. Jahrbuch für außereuropäische Geschichte 3 (in cooperation with Willi Paul Adams et al.), Münster: Lit.
- South Asia Institute: The Third Decade (together with Siegfried Schwertner), Heidelberg (Bulletin of the South Asia Institute of Heidelberg University 1985/92).

1994

- Periplus 1994. Jahrbuch für außereuropäische Geschichte 4 (in cooperation with Willi Paul Adams et al.), Münster: Lit.

1995

- Indien: Kultur, Politik, Wirtschaft, Umwelt. Ein Handbuch, München: C.H. Beck.
- Our Laws. Their Lands: Land Use in Modern Colonial Societies (together with Jap de Moor), Münster (Periplus Parerga 2): Lit.
- Periplus 1995. Jahrbuch für außereuropäische Geschichte 5 (in cooperation with Willi Paul Adams et al.), Münster: Lit.

1996

- Liberalising India. Progress and Problems, New Delhi (South Asian Studies 29): Manohar.
- Periplus 1996. Jahrbuch für außereuropäische Geschichte 6 (in cooperation with Willi Paul Adams et al.), Münster: Lit.

1997

- Legitimacy and Conflict in South Asia (together with Subrata K. Mitra), New Delhi: Manohar.
- Periplus 1997. Jahrbuch für außereuropäische Geschichte 7 (in cooperation with Willi Paul Adams et al.), Münster: Lit.

1998

- Periplus 1998. Jahrbuch für außereuropäische Geschichte 8 (in cooperation with Willi Paul Adams et al.), Münster: Lit.

1999

- Aneignung und Selbstbehauptung. Antworten auf die europäische Expansion, München: Oldenbourg.
- Periplus 1999. Jahrbuch für außereuropäische Geschichte 9 (in cooperation with Willi Paul Adams et al.), Münster: Lit.

=== Articles ===
1959

- "Political Factions and the Great Awakening", Pennsylvania History 24, p. 4ff.

1960

- "The German Problem of Colonial Pennsylvania", Pennsylvania Magazine of History and Biography, 84, p. 1ff.
- "The Punjab Press and Non-Cooperation in 1920", Indian History Congress. Proceedings of the 23rd Session, Aligarh, p. 39–47.

1961

- "Reform and Repression, 1907-1910", Indian History Congress. Proceedings of the 24th Session, Delhi 1961, p. 127–139.

1962

- "Bewegung und Verfassung. Eine Untersuchung der politischen Willensbildung in Indien, 1900-1950", Vierteljahreshefte für Zeitgeschichte 10, p. 126–148.
- "Constitutional Reforms versus National Agitation in India, 1900-1950", Journal of Asian Studies 21, p. 505–522.

1963

- "Lee Kuan Yew, der Gegenspieler in Singapur", Indo-Asian 5, p. 326–230.
- "Nationenbildung in Indien", Vierteljahreshefte für Zeitgeschichte 11, p. 392–403.

1964

- "Indonesien und die Weltpolitik", Studien zur Entwicklung in Süd- und Ostasien, Neue Folge Pt. 3., Frankfurt am Main (Schriften des Instituts für Asienkunde in Hamburg 16), p. 1–28.

1965

- "Die Rolle der westlichen Bildungsschicht in den politischen Massenbewegungen in Indien im 20. Jahrhundert", XXI Congrés International des Sciences Historiques, Rapport II. p. 163–176.
- "Friedrich Schlegel and the Wisdom of India", in: Heima Rau (ed.), South Asian Studies, New Delhi (Max Müller Bhavan Publications 2), p. 1–18.
- "Three Systems of Higher Education: India, Germany, U.S.A.", Yearbook of the Max Müller Bhavan, New Delhi, p. 17–36.

1966

- "Die historische Analyse des Bodenrechts als eine Grundlage für das Verständnis gegenwärtiger Agrarstrukturprobleme, dargestellt am Beispiel Indiens", in: Jahrbuch des Südasien-Instituts der Universität Heidelberg, 1966, p. 149–166.
- "Nehru and Early Indian Socialism", in: S.N. Mukherjee (ed.), South Asian Affairs II. The Movements for National Freedom in India, Oxford (St. Anthony's Papers 18), p. 98–111.

1967

- "Geschichtswissenschaft und Entwicklungspolitik", Vierteljahreshefte für Zeitgeschichte 15, p. 325–340.
- "The Bengal Tenancy Act of 1885 and ist Impact on Legislation in other Provinces", Bengal Past and Present 86, p. 90–105.

1968

- "Emancipation or Re-Integration. The Politics of Gopal Krishna Gokhale and Herbert Hope Risley", in: D. A. Low (ed.), Soundings in Modern South Asian History, London, p. 131–158.
- "Indien im wechselnden Urteil der Sowjetunion" Außenpolitik 19, p. 437–446.
- "Indien und die Sowjetunion. Handelbeziehungen und Entwicklungshilfe", Indo-Asia 2, p. 247–260.
- "Süd- und Südostasien", Internationale Politik 1962, p. 335–368.
- "Südasien-Zentren an amerikanischen Universitäten", Indo-Asia 10, p. 174–182.

1969

- "Chinas Einfluss in den Randgebieten Südasiens" Internationale Politik 1963, p. 401–405.
- "Die Begrenzte Neuorientierung Pakistans in der internationalen Politik" Internationale Politik 1963, p. 417–422.
- "Die Grenzkonflikte Indiens und ihre Folgen für die Bündnisfreiheit" Internationale Politik 1963, p. 405–416.
- "Gandhi als Phänomen der indischen Politik", in: Aus Politik und Zeitgeschichte. Beilage zur Wochenzeitung "Das Parlament" 10, p. 3–13.
- "Gandhi als schöpferischer Politiker" in: Dietmar Rothermund et al. (eds.), Mahatma Gandhi 1869-1969, Bonn, p. 7–14
- "Government, Landlord and Tenant in India, 1875-1900", Indian Economic and Social History Review 6, p. 351–367.
- "India and the Soviet Union" Annals of the American Academy of Political and Social Sciences 386, p. 78–88.

1970

- "Bewegung und Verfassung. Eine Untersuchung der politischen Willensbildung in Indien, 1900-1950", in: Rudolf von Albertini (ed.), Moderne Kolonialgeschichte, Köln, p. 365–388.
- "Constitutional Reforms versus National Agitation in India, 1900–1950" in: Dietmar Rothermund (ed.), The Phases of Indian Nationalism and Other Essays, Bombay, p. 116–143.
- "Die historische Analyse des Bodenrechts als eine Grundlage für das Verständnis gegenwärtiger Agrarstrukturprobleme dargestellt am Beispiel Indiens", in: Rudolf von Albertini (ed.), Moderne Kolonialgeschichte, Köln, p. 293–309.
- "Emancipation or Re-Integration. The Politics of Gopal Krishna Gokhale and Herbert Risley", in: Dietmar Rothermund (ed.), The Phases of Indian Nationalism and Other Essays, Bombay, p. 26–56.
- "Ideologie und Machtkämpfe in Asien", Internationale Politik 1964–1965, p. 4–20.
- "Impediments to 'Development from Below' in India's Economic History", Asian and African Studies 6, p. 47–73.
- "Impediments to 'Development from Below' in India's Economic History", in: Dietmar Rothermund (ed.), The Phases of Indian Nationalism and Other Essays, Bombay, p. 221–248.
- "Impediments to 'Development from Below' in India's Economic History", in: Martin Rudner (ed.), Society and Development in Asia, Jerusalem, p. 47–73.
- "India’s Silver Currency. An Aspect of Monetary Policy of British Imperialism", Indian Economic and Social History Review 7, p. 351–367.
- "India’s Silver Currency. An Aspect of Monetary Policy of British Imperialism", in: Dietmar Rothermund (ed.), The Phases of Indian Nationalism and Other Essays, Bombay, p. 249–266.
- "Nehru and Early Indian Socialism", in: Dietmar Rothermund (ed.), The Phases of Indian Nationalism and Other Essays, Bombay, p. 65–80.
- "Political Factions and the Great Awakening", in: D. B. Rutman (ed.), The Great Awakening, New York.
- "Reform and Repression, 1907-1910", in: Dietmar Rothermund (ed.), The Phases of Indian Nationalism and Other Essays, Bombay, p. 83–92.
- "The Bengal Tenancy Act of 1885 and ist Impact on Legislation in other Provinces", in: Dietmar Rothermund (ed.), The Phases of Indian Nationalism and Other Essays, Bombay, p. 197–217.
- "The Punjab Press and Non-Cooperation in 1920", in: Dietmar Rothermund (ed.), The Phases of Indian Nationalism and Other Essays, Bombay, p. 93–103.
- "The Role of the Western Educated Elite in Political Mass Movements in India in the 20th Century", in: Dietmar Rothermund (ed.), The Phases of Indian Nationalism and Other Essays, Bombay, p. 144–162.
- "Traditionalism and Socialism in Vivekananda’s Thought", Quest 67, p. 34–38.
- "Traditionalism and Socialism in Vivekananda’s Thought", in: Dietmar Rothermund (ed.), The Phases of Indian Nationalism and Other Essays, Bombay, p. 57–64.

1971

- "Süd- und Südostasien", Internationale Politik 58–60, p. 787–842.
- "The Record of Rights in British India", Indian Economic and Social History Review 8, p. 443–461.

1972

- "Marginalität und Elite in Entwicklungsländern", Die Dritte Welt 1, p. 15–22.

1973

- "Freedom of Contract and the Problem of Land Alienation in British India", South Asia 3, p. 57–78.
- "Impediments to 'Development from Below' in India's Economic History", in: Kulturabteilung der Deutschen Botschaft New Delhi (ed.), German Scholars on India, New Delhi (Contributions in Indian Studies 1), p. 245–267.
- "Max Müller and India’s Quest for a National Past", in: Heimo Rau (ed.), Max Müller: 150th Birth Anniversary, Bombay (Dialogue 1972/73), p. 53–62.

1974

- "Nationalismus und Staatsbildung in Indien", in: Theodor Schieder (ed.), Staatsgründungen und Nationalitätsprinzip, München (Studien zur Geschichte des neunzehnten Jahrhunderts 7), p. 153–160.
- "Probleme der deutsch-indischen Kulturbeziehungen", Indo-Asia 16, p. 26–35.
- "Akkulturation und Herrschaft in Indien", Zeitschrift für Kulturaustausch 24(4), p. 42–46.

1975

- "Indiens Verhältnis zu seiner Geschichte", Indo-Asia 17, p. 41–50.
- "Regionale Schwerpunkte in der indischen Geschichte", Indo-Asia 17, p. 249–260.

1976

- "Gebundene Gesellschaft: Soziale Schichtung und Emanzipation in Indien", in: U. Engelhardt (ed.), Soziale Bewegung und politische Verfassung, Stuttgart, p. 394–414.
- "Koloniales Erbe und Wirtschaftsentwicklung in Indien", Indo-Asia 18, p. 140–146.
- "The Land Revenue Problem in British India", Bengal Past and Present 97, p. 210–226.

1977

- "A Survey of Rural Migration and Land Reclamation in British India, 1885", Journal of Peasant Studies 4, p. 230–242.

1978

- "Europe and Asia in the Age of Mercantilism", Yearbook of the Max Müller Bhavan 1978, New Delhi, p. 87–96.
- "Nationalismus und sozialer Wandel in der Dritten Welt – 12 Thesen", in: Otto Dann (ed.), Nationalismus und sozialer Wandel, Hamburg, p. 187–208.
- "Recent Work on Indian History in the Federal Republic of Germany", Yearbook of the Max Müller Bhavan 1978, New Delhi, p. 81–86.
- "Tenancy Legislation for Chota Nagpur: The Emphasis on Executive Protection", in: Dietmar Rothermund and D. C. Wadhwa (eds.), Zamindars Mines and Peasants: Studies in the History of an Indian Coalfield and It’s Rural Hinterland, New Delhi (South Asian Studies 9a; Dhanbad Research Project 1), p. 69–83.
- "The Coalfield: An Enclave in a Backward Region", in: Dietmar Rothermund and D. C. Wadhwa (eds.), Zamindars, Mines and Peasants: Studies in the History of an Indian Coalfield and Ist Rural Hinterland, New Delhi (South Asian Studies 9a; Dhanbad Research Project 1), p. 1–20.

1979

- "Traditionalism and National Solidarity in India", in: R.J. Moore (ed.), Tradition and Politics in South Asia, New Delhi, p. 191–197.

1980

- "Epilogue: Urban Growth and Rural Stagnation", in: Dietmar Rothermund, Erhard Kropp, Gunther Dienemann (eds.), Urban Growth and Rural Stagnation, New Delhi (South Asian Studies 9b; Dhanbad Research Project 2), p. 453–463.
- "The Great Depression and British Financial Policy in India, 1929-1934", The Indian Economic and Social History Review 17.

1981

- "British Foreign Trade Policy in India during the Great Depression, 1929-1939", Indian Economic and Social History Review 18, p. 349–376.
- "Indiens Zukunft", Indo-Asia 23, p. 7–17.
- "Pakistan’s Relations with India and Afghanistan", Journal of South Asian and Middle Eastern Studies 5, p. 23–32.

1982

- "Die Dimensionen der Armut: Indien und der Lebensqualitätsindex", in: Norbert Wagner and Hans Christoph Rieger (eds.), Grundbedürfnisse als Gegenstand der Entwicklungspolitik: Interdisziplinäre Aspekte der Grundbedarfsstrategie, Wiesbaden, p. 163–174.
- "Einführungserklärung für die Arbeitsgemeinschaft Außereuropäischer Geschichte im Verband der Historiker Deutschlands", Wissenschaftsbörse Entwicklungspolitik 82, p. 11–12.
- "Pakistans Beziehungen zu Indien und Afghanistan", Vierteljahresberichte: Probleme der Entwicklungsländer 87, p. 29–36.
- "Probleme der nationalen Integration in Südasien", in: H.A. Winkler (ed.), Nationalismus in der Welt von heute, Göttingen, p. 140–156.

1983

- "A Survey of Rural Migration and Land Reclamation in British India, 1885", in: Dietmar Rothermund (ed.), The Indian Economy under British Rule and Other Essays, New Delhi, p. 54–72.
- "British Foreign Trade Policy in India during the Great Depression, 1929–1939", in: Dietmar Rothermund (ed.), The Indian Economy under British Rule and Other Essays, New Delhi, p. 175–208.
- "Chinas verspätete Krise: 1933-1935", in: Dietmar Rothermund (ed.), Die Peripherie in der Weltwirtschaftskrise: Afrika, Asien und Lateinamerika 1929-1939, Paderborn (Sammlung Schöningh zur Geschichte und Gegenwart) (143), p. 226–244.
- "Die Anfänge der indischen Wirtschaftsplanung im Zweiten Weltkrieg", in: P. Halblützel et al. (ed.), Dritte Welt: Historische Prägung und politische Herausforderung. Festschrift für Rudolf von Albertini zum 60. Geburtstag, Wiesbaden (Beiträge zur Kolonial- und Überseegeschichte 24), p. 81–93.
- "Die Interferenz von Agrarpreissturz und Freiheitskampf in Indien", in: Dietmar Rothermund (ed.), Die Peripherie in der Weltwirtschaftskrise: Afrika, Asien und Lateinamerika 1929-1939, Paderborn (Sammlung Schöningh zur Geschichte und Gegenwart 143), p. 128–143.
- "Social Structure and Emancipation in India", in: Rothermund, Dietmar (ed.), The Indian Economy under British Rule and Other Essays, New Delhi, p. 23–41.
- "The Great Depression and British Financial Policy in India, 1929-1934", in: Dietmar Rothermund (ed.), The Indian Economy under British Rule and Other Essays, New Delhi, p. 152–174.
- "The Land Revenue Problem in British India", in: Dietmar Rothermund (ed.), The Indian Economy under British Rule and Other Essays, New Delhi, p. 92–113.
- "The Record of Rights in British India", in: Dietmar Rothermund (ed.), The Indian Economy under British Rule and Other Essays, New Delhi, p. 73–91.
- "Weltgefälle und Weltwirtschaftskrise", in: Dietmar Rothermund (ed.), Die Peripherie in der Weltwirtschaftskrise: Afrika, Asien und Lateinamerika 1929-1939, Paderborn (Sammlung Schöningh zur Geschichte und Gegenwart 143), p. 14–35.

1984

- "History as a Social Process and as a Social Science", in: Ravinder Kumar (ed.), Philosophical Theory and Social Reality, New Delhi, p. 79–98.
- "Indien 2000", Asien 10, p. 22–38.
- "Nord-Süd Dialog und Entwicklungshilfe: Indiens Wirtschaft in der Welt der Gegenwart", in: Institut für wissenschaftliche Zusammenarbeit mit Entwicklungsländern (ed.) Indien: Probleme eines Schwellenlandes, Tübingen (Reihe Länderseminare), p. 8–27.
- "Wilhelm Hahn und das Südasien-Institut", in: H. Reulinger and G. G. Wolf (eds.), Kreuzwege. Festschrift für Kulturminister a. D. Prof. Dr. Wilhelm Hahn zum 75. Geburtstag, Heidelberg, p. 179–182.

1985

- "Pfeffer, Silber, Seide. Europas Weg nach China", in: G. Sievernich et al. (eds.), Europa und die Kaiser von China, Frankfurt am Main, p. 38–57.
- "The German Intellectual Quest for India", in: 1960-1985. 25 Years Deutscher Akademischer Austauschdienst (DAAD) in New Delhi, p. 5–16.
- "Regionale Differenzierung in Indien: Britische Herrschaft, Freiheitskampf und Föderalismus", in: Hermann Kulke und Dietmar Rothermund (eds.), Regionale Tradition in Südasien, Stuttgart, p. 205–218.
- "Region, regionale Tradition und Regionalismus in Südasien: Versuch einer Einführung in die Thematik" (together with Hermann Kulke), in: Hermann Kulke and Dietmar Rothermund (eds.), Regionale Tradition in Südasien, Stuttgart, p. ix–xxiv.
- "Indien 1985: Eine innenpolitische Bilanz", Aus Politik und Zeitgeschichte. Beilage zur Wochenzeitung "Das Parlament" 10, p. 3–12.

1986

- "Lala Lajpat Rai and Indian Nationalism", Maharshi Dayanand University Research Journal 1, p. 65–78.
- "The Legacy of the British-Indian in Independent India", in: Wolfgang Mommsen and Jürgen Osterhammel (eds.), Imperialism and After, London, p. 139–159.

1987

- "25 Jahre Südasien-Institut", Ruperto Carola 39, p. 73–74.
- "Anfänge und Beweggründe der europäischen Expansion nach Übersee 1450-1650", Geschichte, Politik und ihre Didaktik 15, p. 5–12.
- "Die Entwicklung Indiens seit 1947", Ruperto Carola 39, p. 68–72.
- "India’s Economic Development: 1947-1987", in: Klaus Voll et al. (eds.), Focus India: Prospects for Development, Bonn (Vierteljahresbericht, Forschungsinstitut der Friedrich-Ebert-Stiftung 110), p. 359–363.
- "Interdisciplinary Asian Area Studies Needed", in: Interdisciplinary Science Review 12, p. 6–8.
- "Introduction: The Fate of the Portuguese in Asia", in: Roderich Ptak (ed.), Portuguese Asia Aspects in History and Economic History, 16th and 17th Century, Wiesbaden (Beiträge zur Südasienforschung 117), p. v–viii.

1988

- "Problems of India’s Arrested Growth under British Rule", in: Clive Dewey (ed.), Arrested Development in India, Delhi, p. 3–11.
- "The Philosophical Context of the Development of German Indology" Indological Studies and South Asian Bibliography, Calcutta (National Library Conferences 3), p. 117–130.

1989

- "Der Traditionalismus als Forschungsgegenstand für Historiker und Orientalisten", Saeculum 40, p. 142–148.
- "Regionale Disparitäten in Indien", in: Werner Draguhn (ed.), Indien in den 90er Jahren, Hamburg (Mitteilungen des Instituts für Asienkunde 175), p. 31–43.

1990

- "A Vulnerable Economy: India in the Great Depression, 1929–1939", in: S. Bose (ed.), South Asia and World Capitalism, Delhi, p. 305–324.
- "Economic and Social Indicators of Regional Disparities in India", in: Dietmar Rothermund and S. K. Saha. (eds.) Regional Disparities in India. Rural and Industrial Dimensions, New Delhi, p. 1–12.
- "Indien 1990: Bestandsaufnahme und Zukunftsperspektiven", Asien 35, p. 5–12.
- "Indien 1990: Strukturprobleme und Entwicklungstendenzen", in: Dietmar Rothermund (ed.), Erste Heidelberger Südasiengespräche, Stuttgart (Beiträge zur Südasienforschung 135), p. 13–16.
- "Rabindranath Tragore in Darmstadt, 10. Bis 14. Juni 1921", in: Edmund Weber (ed.), Indien in Deutschland, Frankfurt am Main etc., p. 11–18.

1991

- "Asian Emporia and European Bridgeheads", in: Dietmar Rothermund and Roderich Ptak (eds.), Emporia, Commodities and Entrepreneurs in Asian Maritime Trade, c. 1400-1750, Stuttgart (Beiträge zur Südasienforschung 141), p. 3–8.
- "Asiatische Emporien und europäische Brückenköpfe", Periplus 1, p. 1–6.
- "Economic and Social Indicators of Regional Disparities in India" in: Dietmar Rothermund (ed.), Regional Disparities in India: Rural and Industrial Dimensions, p- 1–11.
- "Problems of Parliamentarism in India", Asien 39, p. 21–31.
- "Wenn ich ein Tscheche wäre", in: Heidi Bonet-von der Thüsen (ed.), Denkanstöße ´91. Ein Lesebuch aus Philosophie, Natur- und Humanwissenschaften, München (Serie Piper 1171), p. 85–88.

1992

- "Geschichte als Fragment. Konvergente Verursachung, disparate Wirkungen und beziehungslose Zeitgenossenschaft" in: H.D. Ebbinghaus und G. Vollmer (eds.), Denken unterwegs, Stuttgart, p. 93–104.
- "Staat und Gesellschaft in Indien nach der Erlangung der Unabhängigkeit", in: E. Gormsen and A. Timm (eds.), Zivilgesellschaft und Staat in der Dritten Welt, Mainz (interdisziplinärer Arbeitskreis Dritte Welt, Veröffentlichungen 6), p. 105–114.
- "Staat und Gesellschaft in Indien", in: Jürgen Elvert and Michael Salewski (eds.), Staatenbildung in Übersee, Stuttgart (Historische Mittelungen Beiheft 2), p. 125–136.
- "Town and Country in india", in: J. Johansen, E. Petersen, H. Stevnsborg (eds.), Clashes of Cultures. Essays in Honour of Niels Steensgaard, Odense, p. 273–283.

1993

- "Dokument zum Thema: Koçibeys Denkschrift über den Verfall des Osmanischen Reiches", Periplus 1993, p. 61–68.
- "German Tamilology: Foreword", in: C.S. Mohanavelu, German Tamilology: German Contributions to Tamil Language, Literature and Culture During the Period 1706–1945, Madras, p. vi–vii.
- "Nationale und regionale Geschichtsschreibungen in Indien", Periplus 1993, p. 75–83.
- "Vasco da Gama und der Weg nach Calicut", in: Christof Dipper and Martin Vogt (eds.), Ringvorlesung: Entdeckungen und frühe Kolonien, Darmstadt (Technische Hochschule Darmstadt, Schriftenreihe Wissenschaft und Technik 63), p. 187–209.
- "Zerstörung der Moschee von Ayodhya – Indiens Schicksalsstunde?" Geographische Rundschau 45 (11), November 1993, p. 626–630.

1994

- "Gandhi’s Concepts of Individual Conduct and Social Life", Indian Horizons 43, p. 179–184 (Special Issue: Gandhi 125 Years, ed. By B. R. Nanda).
- "Indien", in: Dieter Nohlen and Frank Nuscheler (eds.), Handbuch der Dritten Welt, Band 7: Südasien und Südostasien, 3. Aufl., Bonn, p. 205–243.
- "Land-Revenue Law and Land Records in British India", in: Jap de Moor and Dietmar Rothermund (eds.), Our Laws, Their Lands, Münster, p. 120–133.

1995

- "Das Bevölkerungswachstum", in: Dietmar Rothermund (ed.), Indien: Kultur, Geschichte, Politik, Wirtschaft, Umwelt, München, p. 59–65.
- "Das Bildungswesen", in: Dietmar Rothermund (ed.), Indien: Kultur, Geschichte, politik, Wirtschaft, Umwelt, München, p. 339–348.
- "Die deutsch-indischen Beziehungen", in: Dietmar Rothermund (ed.), Indien: Kultur, Geschichte, Politik, Wirtschaft, Umwelt, München, p. 472–482.
- "Die Industrialisierung Indiens im 19. und 20. Jahrhundert", in: Peter Feldbauer et al. (eds.), Industrialisierung: Entwicklungsprozesse in Afrika, Asien und Lateinamerika, Frankfurt am Main/Wien (Beiträge zur Historischen Sozialkunde Beiheft 6/1995), p. 101–116.
- "Die Stadien der wirtschaftlichen Entwicklung", in: Dietmar Rothermund (ed.), Indien: Kultur, Geschichte, Politik, Wirtschaft, Umwelt, München, p. 485–501.
- "Die Stellung der Frau in der Gesellschaft" (together with Chitra Rothermund), in: Dietmar Rothermund (ed.), Indien: Kultur, Geschichte, Politik, Wirtschaft, Umwelt, München, p. 134–139.
- "Epochen der indischen Geschichte", in: Dietmar Rothermund (ed.), Indien: Kultur, Geschichte, Politik, Wirtschaft, Umwelt, München, p. 77–100.
- "Genossenschaften, Gewerkschaften und Verbände", in: Dietmar Rothermund (ed.), Indien: Kultur, Geschichte, Politik, Wirtschaft, Umwelt, München, p. 537–549.
- "Indien als asiatische Großmacht", internationale Politik 50 (5), Mai 1995, p. 47–52.
- "Indien: Von der Planwirtschaft zur Liberalisierung", in: Wolfram Fischer (ed.), Lebensstandard und Wirtschaftssysteme, Frankfurt am Mai (Veröffentlichungen der DG Bank 20), p. 501–542.
- "Parlamentarische Demokratie und Föderalismus", in: Dietmar Rothermund (ed.), Indien: Kultur, Geschichte, Politik, Wirtschaft, Umwelt, München, p. 389–408.
- "Regionale Diskrepanzen", in: Dietmar Rothermund (ed.), Indien: Kultur, Geschichte, Politik, Wirtschaft, Umwelt, München, p. 66–73.
- "Sri Lanka – Geschichte und Gegenwart", in: Georg Berkemer and Tilman Frasch (eds.), Sri Lanka: Fünfte Heidelberger Südasiengespräche, Stuttgart (Beiträge zur Südasienforschung 171), p. 1–6.
- "Staat und Markt in Indien 1757-1995", in: Helga Breuninger and Rolf Peter Sieferle (eds.), Markt und Macht in der Geschichte, Stuttgart, p. 177–205.

1996

- "Indien am Scheideweg", Blätter für Deutsche und Internationale Politik 8, p. 945–952.
- "Wirtschaftsgesinnung im Hinduismus", Geographische Rundschau 48, p. 352–357.
- "Liberalisierung in Indien", Ruperto Carola 3, p. 16–22.

1997

- "Conflict as a Challenge to Legitimacy: A Historical Perspective", in: Subrata K. Mitra and Dietmar Rothermund (eds.), Legitimacy and Conflict in South Asia, New Delhi, p. 7–16.
- "Deutschland und Südasien – Partnerschaft in Gegenwart und Zukunft", in: Georg Berkemer and Tilman Frasch (eds.), Die Deutsche Zusammenarbeit mit Südasien. Sechste Heidelberger Südasiengespräche, Stuttgart 1997 (Beiträge zur Südasienforschung 176), p. 9–14.
- "Historische Aspekte der Ernährungssicherung in Indien", in: Hans-Georg Bohle et al. (eds.), Ernährungssicherung in Südasien, Siebte Heidelberger Südasiengespräche, Stuttgart 1997 (Beiträge zur Südasienforschung 178), p. 31–36.
- "Indiens Rolle in der globalen Politik", in: Erich Reiter (ed.), Österreichisches Jahrbuch für internationale Sicherheitspolitik 1997, Graz/Wien/Köln, p. 359–373.
- "Konstruktionen nationaler Solidarität in Asien. Universalismus und Traditionalismus", in: M. Brocker and Heino Nau (eds.), Ethnozentrismus. Möglichkeiten und Grenzen des interkulturellen Dialogs, Darmstadt, p. 170–190.
- "Nationalism and the Reconstruction of Traditions in Asia", in: Sri Kuhnt-Saptowedo et al. (eds.), Nationalism and Cultural Revival in Southeast Asia: Perspectives from the Centre and the Region, Wiesbaden, p. 13–28.
- "Indiens Wachstum in einem halben Jahrhundert", Indien in der Gegenwart 2 (1-2), p. 163–171.

1998

- "Aussenpolitik und Entwicklungsstrategien in Indien und Bangladesh", in: Jahrbuch für Internationale Politik 1995-96, München, p. 239–246.
- "Die Macht der Geschichte", in: Der Bürger im Staat 48,1 (Themenheft ("Indien"), ed. By Landeszentrale für politische Bildung Stuttgart, p. 15–19.
- "Gandhis Begegnung mit der Gewalt", in: Rolf-Peter Sieferle and Helga Breuninger (eds.), Kulturen der Gewalt. Ritualisierung und Symbolisierung von Gewalt in der Geschichte, Frankfurt/New York, p. 241–252.
- "The Fall-out of a New Political Regime in India", in: Asien 68, 2, p. 5–20.
- "Der Seeweg nach Indien", in: Periplus. Jahrbuch für außereuropäische Geschichte 8, Münster, p. 1–8.
- "Geschichte von unten: Die ‚subaltern studies‘ in Indien", in: Jahrbuch für die Geschichte Lateinamerikas 35, p. 301–318.
- "Globalgeschichte, Weltgeschichte, Universalgeschichte", in: Beiträge zur Historischen Sozialkunde, Sondernummer 1998, S. 4–10.
- "Indiens Arbeiterklasse als Forschungsgegenstand in der DDR", in: Wolf-Hagen Krauth and Ralf Wolz (eds.), Wissenschaft und Wiedervereinigung. Asien- und Afrikawissenschaften im Umbruch, Berlin, p. 363–372.
- "Mahatma Gandhi’s Ethics", in: Jaroslav Vacek and Jan Dvorak (eds.), Trends in Indian Studies. Proceedings of the ESIS. Prague, p. 151–158.
- "Von den Moguln zu den Briten – Indien von 1526 bis 1857", in: Brockhaus. Die Weltgeschichte, vol. 4: Wege in die Moderne (1650–1850), Leipzig/Mannheim, p. 484–499.

1999

- "Das Attentat auf Mahatma Gandhi", in: Roland Aegerter (ed.), Politische Attentate des 20. Jahrhunderts, Zurich, p. 125–139.
- "The Changing Pattern of British Trade in Indian Textiles, 1701-1757", in: Sushil Chaudhury and Michel Morineau (eds.), Merchants, Companies and Trade. Europe and Asia in the Early Modern Era, Cambridge, p. 276–286.
- "Europa und Indien", in: Werner Weidenfeld (ed.), Europa-Handbuch, Gütersloh, p. 741–649.
- "Indiens Wirtschaftspolitik im Zeitalter der Globalisierung", in: Geographische Rundschau, 51,3, p. 90–95.
- "Regionale Disparitäten in Indien", in: Werner Draguhn (ed.), Indien 1999, Hamburg, p. 273–287.
- "Der Strukturwandel des britischen Kolonialstaates in Indien, 1757–1947", in: Wolfgang Reinhard (ed.), Verstaatlichung der Welt?, Munich, p. 69–86.

== Sources ==
=== Books ===
- Jain, Ajay Kumar: Explorations in the History of South Asia. Essays in Honour of Dietmar Rothermund. Festschrift for Dietmar Rothermund, Delhi, 2001.

=== External links ===
- Deutsche Nationalbibliothek: Literature by and about Dietmar Rothermund, on: portal.dnb.de, Retrieved 12 August 2021.
- Deutscher Historikerverband: Geschichte des Arbeitskreises für Weltregionale und Globale Geschichte , on: historikerverband.de Retrieved 12 August 2021.
- Gosh, Partha: Greeting India’s German friend on his 85th Geburtstag, on: tribuneindia.com, Retrieved 12 August 2021.
- Heidelberg University: Federal Cross of Merit Awarded to Prof. Dr. Dietmar Rothermund, on: uni-heidelberg.de, Retrieved 12 August 2021.
- South-Asia Institute Heidelberg: Congratulations to Prof. Dietmar Rothermund, on: sai.uni-heidelberg.de, Retrieved 12 August 2021.
- South-Asia Institute Heidelberg: Emeriti. Prof. Dr. Dietmar Rothermund, on: sai.uni-heidelberg.de, Retrieved 12 August 2021.
- South-Asia Institute Heidelberg: Obituary for Prof. Dr. Dietmar Rothermund, on: sai.uni-heidelberg.de, Retrieved 12 August 2021.
- Schwarz, Michael: 10. Heidelberger Südasiengespräche "Fundamentalismus in Südasien, on: idw-online.de, Retrieved 12 August 2021.

=== Articles ===
- Dharampal, Gita: Nachruf Rothermund. Ein Riese der deutschen Südasien-Geschichte ist verstorben, on: sai.uni-heidelberg.de, Retrieved 12 August 2021.
- Eckert, Andreas: "Innere Mission. Dietmar Rothermund (1933-2020) und die Geschichte der Weltregionen in Deutschland", in: Geschichte und Gesellschaft, vol. 46, no. 4, 2020, p. 750–761.
- Engels, Dagmar: "37th. Historikertag (Bamberg, 12–16 October 1988)", in: German History, vol. 7, no. 1, 1989, p. 115–117.
- Fischer-Tiné, Harald (2021): "Cosmopolitan, Bridge-Builder and Missionary: Prof. Dietmar Rothermund, 1933–2020", in: South Asia: Journal of South Asian Studies, 2021.
- Kulke, Hermann: Nekrolog. Dietmar Rothermund (1933-2020), on: sai.uni-heidelberg.de, Retrieved 12 August 2021.
