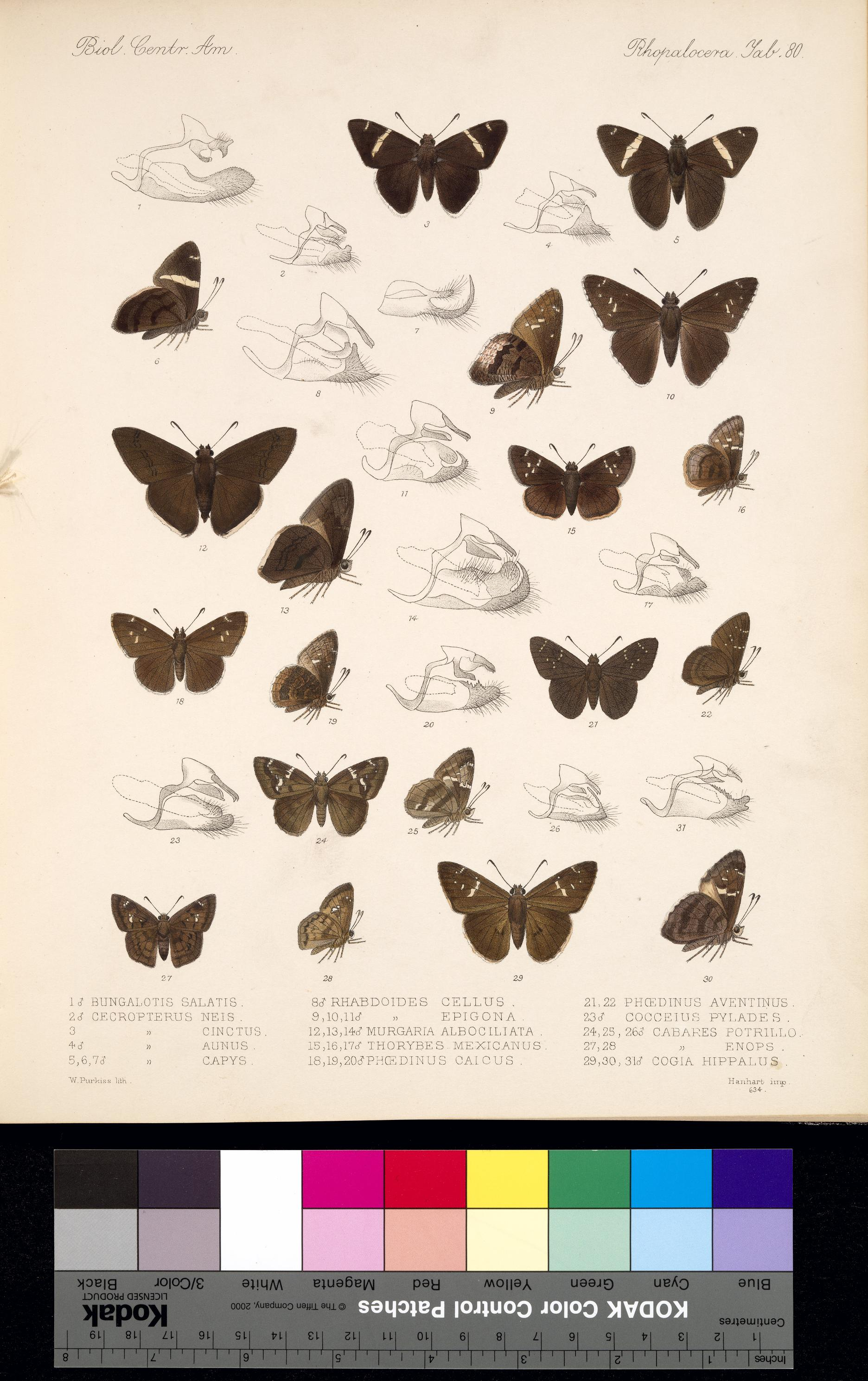
- Cabares potrillo (Lucas, 1857) in Godman & Salvin's Biologia Centrali-Americana.

Scientific classification
- Kingdom: Animalia
- Phylum: Arthropoda
- Class: Insecta
- Order: Lepidoptera
- Family: Hesperiidae
- Subfamily: Eudaminae
- Genus: Cabares; Godman & Salvin, [1894]

= Cabares =

Genus of butterflies

Cabares is a Neotropical genus of butterflies in the family Hesperiidae (Eudaminae).

== Species ==
- Cabares potrillo (Lucas, 1857)
  - C. p. potrillo South Texas to Costa Rica, Greater Antilles, Central America
  - C. p. reducta Mabille & Boullet, 1919 Venezuela
- Cabares rinta Evans, 1952 Argentina
