= American Aborigines =

American Aborigines, may refer to:

- Indigenous peoples of the Americas
- Indigenous Canadians
  - First Nations (disambiguation)
  - Inuit
  - Métis (Canada)
- Alaska Natives
- Native Americans in the United States
- Native Hawaiians
