= Hermann Kulke =

German historian and Indologist (1938–2026)

- Kulke, c. 2000
- Born: 30 May 1938; Berlin, Germany
- Died: 10 March 2026 (aged 87); Kiel, Schleswig-Holstein, Germany
- Occupation: Indologist
- Organizations: Heidelberg University; Kiel University
- Awards: Padma Shri; Order of Merit of the Federal Republic of Germany

Hermann Kulke (30 May 1938 – 10 March 2026) was a German historian and Indologist, who was professor of South and Southeast Asian history at the Department of History, Kiel University (1988–2003). After receiving his PhD in Indology from Freiburg University in 1967, he taught for 21 years at the South Asia Institute of Heidelberg University (SAI). Supported by many field trips in the regions, he researched pre-colonial South and Southeast Asian history, early state formation and historiography, and regional cultures of India, especially in Odisha (Odissa). He was a visiting professor at universities in India and Singapore.

== Life and career ==
Kulke was born in Berlin on 30 May 1938 to the architect Erich Kulke and his wife Ilse (née Prassen). He studied Indology, Asian history and political science at the University of Freiburg and the University of Madras. With a dissertation about Chidambaram Mahatmya, a founding legend of the Nataraja Temple in Chidambaram in the 12th century, he achieved a PH.D. in Freiburg in 1967. He worked as an assistant for Indian history at the South Asia Institute of the University of Heidelberg from 1967 to 1988. He undertook several research trips to Sri Lanka, India, Indonesia, Singapore and Cambodia. He completed his habilitation in Heidelberg in 1975. In 1988, he was appointed professor of Asian history at the Kiel University.

Kulke was a founding member of the Orissa Research Project (ORP) of the Southasia Institute (1970–1975), and was coordinator of the second ORP (1999–2005). He focused also on pre-colonial South and Southeast Asian history, early state formation and historiography, regional cultures of India and their impact in modern history.

He was a visiting professor at Utkal University in Bhubaneswar (1978–1979), Asiatic Society in Kolkata (1986), and Jawaharlal Nehru University in Delhi (1992). He was also the Fellow of the Institute of Southeast Asian Studies, in Singapore (1987) and of the Asia Research Institute of the University of Singapore (2007).

In 2005, he received the Gold Medal of the Asiatic Society of Kolkata. In 2010, he was awarded the order of Padma Shri by the President of India. He received the Order of Merit of the Federal Republic of Germany from the President of Germany in 2011.

Kulke died in Kiel on 10 March 2026, at the age of 87.

== Publications ==
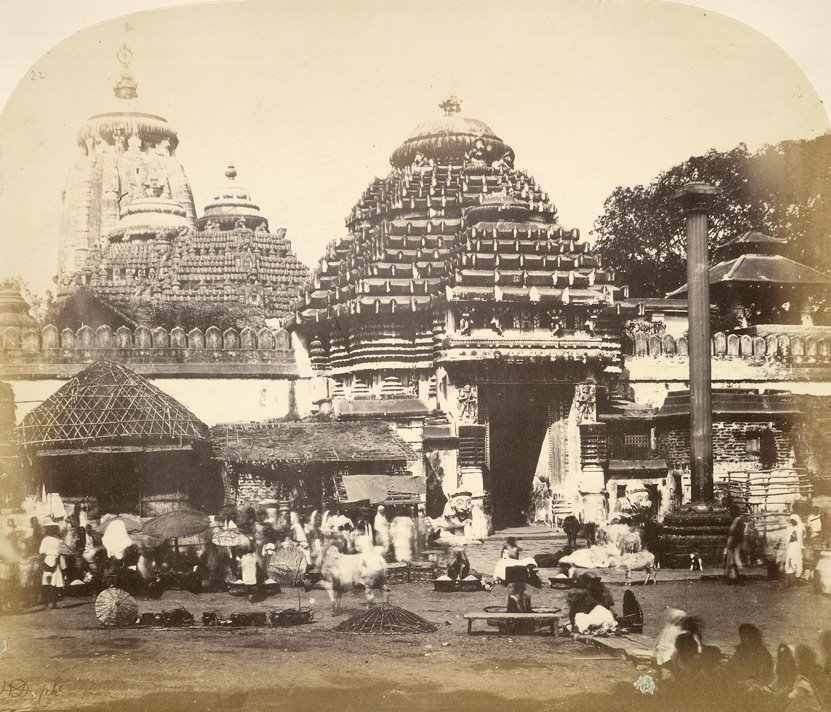
Jagannath Temple in Odisha

Kulke's publications include:

- Cidambaramahatmya. Eine Untersuchung der religionsgeschichtlichen und historischen Hintergründe für die Entstehung der Tradition einer südindischen Tempelstadt (= Freiburger Beiträge zur Indologie. Harrassowitz, Wiesbaden 1970, ISBN 3-447-00548-3 (1967 dissertation)
- The Cult of Jagannath and the Regional Tradition of Orissa (Delhi 1978, with A. Eschmann and G.C. Tripathi) ISSN 0584-3170)
- The Devaraja Cult (Cornell University 1978, Southeast Asia Program. Department of Far Eastern Studies. doi:10.7788/saeculum.1974.25.1.24
- Jagannath Cult and Gajapaati Kingship (Jagannatha-Kult und Gajapati-Königtum. Ein Beitrag zur Geschichte religiöser Legitimation hinduistischer Herrscher, D.Litt-Habilitation, Stuttgart 1979, in German) ISBN 3-515-02725-4
- A History of India (together with Dietmar Rothermund, German 1982, 5th Engl. ed. 2010) ISBN 3-17-007097-5
- Hinduism Reconsidered (Delhi 1989, 2nd ed. 1997, with G.D. Sontheimer)
- Kings and Cults – State Formation and Legitimation in India and Southeast Asia (Delhi 1993)
- Editor of The State in India 1000–1700 (Delhi 1993, 2nd ed. in preparation).
- Indian History until 1750 (Indische Geschichte bis 1750, Munich 2005, Engl. ed. in preparation)
- Co-editor of Nagapatinam to Suvarnadwipa. Reflections on the Chola Naval Expeditions to Southeast Asia (Singapore 2009).
- Co-editor of Centres Out There? Facets of Sub-regional Traditions in Orissa (Delhi 2010)
- Co-editor of Rituals and the State in India (Wiesbaden 2010).
- (Co-editor with G. Berkemer, eds.) Centres out There? Facets of Subregional Identities in Orissa. New Delhi: Manohar, 2011.
- The Katakarajavamsavali: The Colonial Biography of Puri's Sanskrit Chronicle of the Year 1820, in: Indian Historical Review, 38, 2011, pp. 65–76.
- Hindu Medieval Regional Kingdoms, in: Encyclopedia of Hinduism, Vol. IV, ed. by A. Malinar, Leiden (Brill, 2012), pp. 51–72.
- Trade and Politics in Eleventh-Century Bay of Bengal, in: The Trading World of the Indian Ocean, 1500–1800, ed. by Om Prakash (History of Science, Philosophy and Culture in Indian Civilization, gen. ed. D.P. Chattopadhyaya, vol. III, 7). New Delhi: Centre for Studies in Civilization, 2012, pp. 117–132.
- (Co-editor with N. Mohanty, G.N. Dash, D. Pathy, eds.) Imaging Odisha. 2 vols., Prafulla (Jagatsinghpur, 2013).
- Orissa's Regional Tradition and India's Cultural Unity, in: Cultural Unity of India, ed. by S. Bhattacharya, Ramakrishna Mission Institute of Culture (Kolkata 2013), pp. 281–296.
- Jürgen Lütt (20. September 1940-17. Juli 2012), in: Jahrbuch für Europäische Überseegeschichte, 13, 2013, pp. 220–222.
- Der Maurya-Staat (4. – 2. Jh. v. Chr.): Gesamtindisches Großreich oder Imperium? in: Imperien und Reiche in der Weltgeschichte. Epochenübergreifende und globalhistorische Vergleiche, ed. by M. Gehler und R. Rollinger. Harrassowitz (Wiesbaden, 2014), pp. 503–514.
- Co-editor with A. Eschmann and G.C. Tripathi, eds., The Cult of Jagannath and the Regional Tradition of Orissa. Revised and enlarged edition, Manohar, (New Delhi, 2014).
- From Ashoka to Jayavarman VII: Some Reflections on the Relationship between Buddhism and the State in India and Southeast Asia. in:Buddhism Across Asia: Networks of Material, Intellectual and Cultural Exchange, ed. By Tansen Sen, Singapore: Institute of Southeast Asian Studies: Manohar, (Delhi 2014), pp. 327–346. (slightly revised version reprinted in 2014 as Occasional Paper 56, by the India International Centre, New Delhi).
- (Co-editor with George Coedès, Louis-Charles Damais dan Pierre-Yves Manguin), Kedatuan Sriwijaya. Kajian Sumber Prasasti da Arkeologi, Jakarta, École francaise d’Extrême-Orient, Pusat Arkeologi Nasional Komunitas Bambu, 2014.
- ‘Kadātuan Śrīvijaya’ – Imperium atau Kraton Śrīvijaya? Tinjauan Kembali Bukti Epigrafis, in: ibid, pp. 281–314. (Bahasa Indonesia translation of the English article of 1993).
- The Concept of Cultural Convergence Revisited: Reflections on India's Early Influence in Southeast Asia, in: Asian Encounters: Exploring Connected Histories, eds. Upendra Singh and Parul Pandya Dhar, Oxford University Press (New Delhi, 2014), pp. 1–24.
- (together with C.P. Nanda) Rethinking Local History and Identity Politics. Locating Kurmi Community in Odisha, Manohar, (Delhi, 2014).
- (together with B.P. Sahu), eds., Interrogating Political Systems. Integrative Processes and the States in Pre-modern India, Oxford University Press (Delhi, 2014).

In print:

- The State in India 1000–1700 (ed.), revised and enlarged second edition, Delhi: Oxford University Press.
- History of Pre-colonial India: Issues and Debates (revised English edition of Indische Geschichte bis 1750, München: Oldenbourg Verlag. München 2003), revised and edited by B.P.Sahu, translated by P. Chirmuley, Oxford University Press, Delhi.
- State Formation and Social Integration in Pre-Islamic South and Southeast Asia. A Reconsideration of Historiographic Concepts and Archaeological Discoveries (Commentator's Report on Section 2 and 3) Paper of the Second International Symposium of Inter-Asia Research Networks, Tokyo: Toyo Bunko, 8–9 March 2014, in: State Formation and Social Integration in Pre-modern South and Southeast Asia. A Comparative Study of Asian Society, ed. by Karashima and M. Hirosue, Manohar, New Delhi.
- Invented Histories? Reflections on Medieval Historiography in Orissa and Vijayanagara, in: Prof. B.D. Chattopadhyaya Felicitation Volume, ed. by Suchandra Ghosh.
- The Development of R.S. Sharma's Concept of Indian Feudalism: Some Historiographic Reflections, in: R.S. Sharma Commemoration Volume, ed. by K.M. Shrimali, Delhi: Tulika Books and Social Scientist (Modern Indian Thinkers Series).
- Looking for Yayati Kesari: Reflections on Puri's Temple Chronicles, in: History, Culture and Society in Odisha, ed. by N. Mohanty. (Souvenir Volume of the Indian History Congress at Cuttack/Odisha, December 2013, pp. 56–68).
- Angkor. Verlag Beck (Munich)

== Sources ==
- Berkemer, Georg; Frenz, Margret: The Role of Hermann Kulke, in: Berkemer, Georg; Frenz, Margret (eds.), Sharing Sovereignty. The Little Kingdom in South Asia, Berlin, 2003
- Brandtner, M.; S.K. Panda (eds.), Interrogating History. Essays for Hermann Kulke (2006)
- Conerman, S.; J. Kusber, (eds.). Studia Eurasiatica. Kieler Festschrift für Hermann Kulke (2003)
- Schnepel, Burkhard; Berkemer, Georg: "History of the Model", in: Berkemer, Georg; Frenz, Margret (eds.), Sharing Sovereignty. The Little Kingdom in South Asia, Berlin, 2003
