= Indya =

Indya is a feminine given name, a modern spelling of India, which itself derives from the name of the River Indus. The River Indus lent its name to the region beyond it, which the Ancient Greeks called Ἰνδία (Indía). The term was later adopted into Latin as India.

Notable people with the name include:

- Indya Kincannon (born 1971), American politician
- Indya Moore (born 1995), American actor, model and activist
- Indya Nivar (born 2004), American basketball player

== See also ==
- India (disambiguation)
