= Indo =

Indo may refer to:

- Indo-, a prefix indicating India or the Indian subcontinent
- Indonesia, a country in Southeast Asia
  - INDO LINES, callsign of Indonesian Airlines
  - Indo people, people of mixed European and Indonesian ancestry
  - Indo cuisine, fusion cuisine of Indonesian and European
- INDO, the Intermediate Neglect of Differential Overlap semi-empirical method
- Indo (apple), an apple cultivar
- Irish Independent, a newspaper commonly nicknamed 'The Indo'
- The slang term 'endo' or 'indo', derived from an AAVE prounuciation for "indoor"-grown marijuana.
- Palacio de Indo, a former palace in Madrid

== See also ==
- Endo (disambiguation)
- Indian (disambiguation)
- India (disambiguation)
