= First Nations =

First nations are Indigenous groups, tribes or bands, most commonly in Australia or Canada.

First Nation(s), first nations, or first peoples may also refer to:

== Indigenous groups ==
- List of Indigenous peoples
- First Nations in Canada, Indigenous peoples of Canada who are neither Inuit nor Métis
  - Lists of First Nations (Canada)
  - List of First Nations band governments (Canada)
  - List of First Nations peoples (Canada)
- Australian First Nations, people with familial heritage from, and membership in, the ethnic groups that lived in Australia before British colonisation
  - List of Australian Aboriginal group names
- List of federally recognized tribes in the United States

== Other uses ==
- "First Nation" (song), a 2020 song by Midnight Oil
- First Nation Airways, a defunct Nigerian airline

== See also ==
- Aborigine (disambiguation)
- American Indians (disambiguation)
- Indian (disambiguation)
- Native Americans (disambiguation)
