= Aboriginal language =

Aboriginal language may refer to:

- Indigenous language
- Australian Aboriginal languages
- Taiwanese aboriginal languages
- Indigenous languages of the Americas
- Aboriginal Malay languages

== See also ==
- Aboriginal English (disambiguation)
