= New India =

New India may refer to:

- New India (newspaper), an early 20th-century English-language daily newspaper in India
- Nava Bharat (New India), a Hindi-language daily newspaper in India
- India Nova (New India), a name used on early maps to refer to North America
- New India Assurance, an Indian insurance company
- New India, an 1885 book by Henry Cotton
- The New India, a 1948 book by Atul Chandra Chatterjee

== See also ==
- India (disambiguation)
- Navbharat Times, Hindi-language daily newspaper in India
