= Native Americans (disambiguation) =

Native Americans in the United States are the indigenous peoples of the United States.

Native Americans or Native American may also refer to:

== Ethnic groups ==
- Indigenous peoples of the Americas, the pre-Columbian peoples of North, South, and Central America and their descendants
  - Indigenous peoples in Canada
  - Indigenous peoples of Mexico
  - Indigenous peoples of Central America
  - Indigenous peoples of South America

== Arts and entertainment ==
- Native American (album), by Tony Rice, 1992
- The Native Americans, a 1994 American documentary series
- "Native Americans", a composition by Ornette Coleman from the 1972 album Skies of America
- "Native American", a song by Little Steven from the 1987 album Freedom – No Compromise
- Native American, or Sons of Beaches, a 1995 album by The Bellamy Brothers

== See also ==
- Nativism (politics), the political policy of promoting the interests of indigenous people over those of immigrants
- Native American identity in the United States
- Native American name controversy
- Native American recognition in the United States
- Native American religions
- History of Native Americans in the United States
- Indigenous languages of the Americas
- American Indians (disambiguation)
- First Nations (disambiguation)
- Indian (disambiguation)
- Know Nothing, known as the Native American Party before 1855, a political movement
