= Indianism =

Indianism may refer to:

- Indian nationalism
- Indianism (arts), a Brazilian literary and artistic movement
- Indigenismo, a Latin American political movement in the mid twentieth-century
- Indianist movement, a movement in American classical music
- Indian English, a class of varieties of the English language spoken in India

== See also ==
- India (disambiguation)
- Indian (disambiguation)
- Indianisation, spread of the religions, culture etc. of India
  - Indianization of Southeast Asia
- Indianisation (British India), allowed Indians into government posts formerly reserved for Europeans in British India
- Indianisation of city names, renaming of cities in India
