= State of India (disambiguation) =

State of India may refer to:

- Portuguese India, formally known as the State of India
- One of the states and union territories of India

== See also ==
- Administrative divisions of India
- Union of India
- Indiana, a U.S. state
