= India (disambiguation) =

India is a country in South Asia.

India may also refer to:

== Places ==
- India, a village in Butor Commune, Transnistria, Moldova
- India, Texas, an unincorporated community in the United States

=== Historical ===
- Indian subcontinent, inclusive of India's neighboring countries
- India (Herodotus), the location of historic India according to Herodotus
- India (Bible), India in biblical geography
- British Indian Empire (British Raj)
- Dominion of India or Union of India (1947 to 1950), the Republic of India before the adoption of its constitution
- India (East Syriac Ecclesiastical Province), a historical ecclesiastical province of the Church of the East
- Greater India, the historical extent of Indian culture beyond the Indian subcontinent
- India (word), the name of the country, including historical appellations

== Arts and entertainment ==
=== Literature ===
- India (Al-Biruni), an 11th-century book on India by Al-Biruni
- India: A Million Mutinies Now, a 1990 book by Indo-Trinidadian writer V. S. Naipaul
- India: A Wounded Civilization, a 1977 book, prequel to the 1990 work, about the history of India by V. S. Naipaul
- India: From Midnight to the Millennium, a 1997 book about the history of modern India by Shashi Tharoor
- India: The Emerging Giant, a 2008 book about Indian economic growth by Arvind Panagariya
- India: The Rise of an Asian Giant, a 2008 book about contemporary Indian economy and its influence
- India: The Urban Transition, a 2014 book about urbanization in India by Henrik Valeur

=== Films and television ===
- India (film), a 1959 documentary-style film about India by Roberto Rossellini
- India: A Love Story, a Brazilian telenovela set in India by Gloria Perez
- India: Kingdom of the Tiger, 2002 IMAX documentary based on the writings of Jim Corbett about the tigers of India
- India: Nature's Wonderland, a 2015 nature documentary about India by the BBC
- India: The Modi Question, a 2023 BBC documentary television series about Indian premier Narendra Modi

=== Music ===
- La India (born 1969), salsa singer from Puerto Rico
- Índia, Gal Costa album (1973)
- India?, a 1984 album by Suns of Arqa
- India (Vega album) (2003)
- India (Xandria album) (2005)
- "India", a song by John Coltrane from Impressions
- "India", a song by Edvin Marton from Virtuoso
- "India", a song by the Psychedelic Furs from The Psychedelic Furs
- "India", a song by Puressence from Puressence
- "India", a 1982 song by Roxy Music from Avalon
- "India", a song by Sadist from Tribe

== People ==
- India (given name), a given name and list of people with the name
- India (actress) (born 1977), pornographic actress and singer
- Jonathan India (born 1996), American baseball player
- La India (born 1969), Puerto Rican singer and songwriter

== Other uses ==
- Indian National Developmental Inclusive Alliance, a political alliance abbreviated as INDIA
- India (battle honour), a battle honour awarded to regiments of the British Army between 1787 and 1826
- India (cat) (1990–2009), George W. Bush's pet cat
- India-class submarine, a military submarine design of the Soviet Union
- 45574 India, a British LMS Jubilee Class locomotive
- India, a letter in the NATO phonetic alphabet
- India (wine), variety of wine from India

== See also ==
- Little India, an environment that is outside India
- India Meridionalis, a phantom peninsula formerly believed to lie east of Malaysia
- India Superior and Alta India ("Upper India"), an area of this peninsula and/or the Americas
- India tag, an item of stationery
- New India (disambiguation)
- Union of India (disambiguation)
- Indian (disambiguation)
- Indianism (disambiguation)
- Indies (disambiguation)
  - East Indies (disambiguation)
  - West Indies (disambiguation)
- Indio (disambiguation)
- Indiana (disambiguation)
- Indica (disambiguation), India in Greek and Latin
- Indus (disambiguation)
- Inđija, a town in Serbia
- "Inndia", a 2012 song by Inna
- Three Indias, sometimes including Ethiopia or the Americas
