= India (given name) =

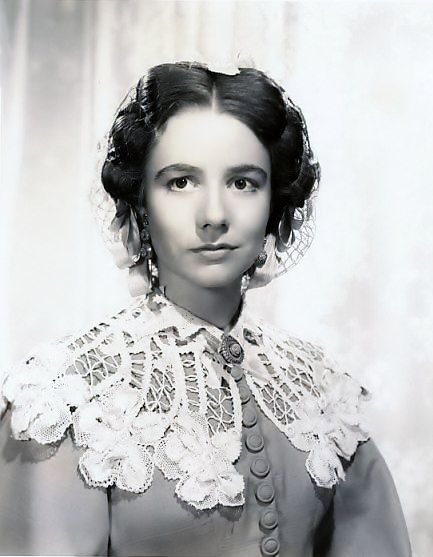
- Alicia Rhett portrayed India Wilkes in the 1939 film Gone with the Wind.
- Gender: Female
- Language: English

Origin
- Meaning: India

India is a feminine given name derived from the name of the country India, which itself takes its name from the Indus River. The name was used for India Wilkes, a character in the novel and film Gone with the Wind. Its use for girls in England began during the British rule in India during the 19th century. It has been used for daughters of aristocratic families in England that had ties to Colonial India, such as India Hicks. It has had an exotic image in the Anglosphere and also is similar in sound to other fashionable names such as Olivia and Sophia. In more recent years, some critics have viewed use of the name for non-Indian girls as problematic because they say it evokes the British Raj and colonialism. Although India is a feminine given name in the world, it is not a popular given name in India.

== Usage ==
The name has been used in the Anglosphere since at least the 19th century. In the United States it ranked among the top 1,000 names for girls at different points between 1880 and 1911. It then declined in use but has had renewed popularity beginning in 1970 and was again among the 1,000 most popular names for American girls at different points between 1970 and 2022. It declined in use for American girls in 2023 and was no longer ranked among the top 1,000 names. It has been among the 200 most popular names for girls in the United Kingdom since 1996 and among the 100 most popular names for girls in Spain since 2017.

== People named India ==
- Princess India of Afghanistan (1929–2023), Afghan royal
- India (actress) (born 1977), American pornographic actress, singer and rapper
- India Adams (1927–2020), American singer
- India Allen (born 1965), American Playboy model
- India Arie (born 1975), American singer-songwriter
- India de Beaufort (born 1987), English actress
- India Jane Birley (born 1961), British artist and businesswoman
- India Boyer (1907–1998), American architect
- India Catalina (fl. early 16th century), local translator/intermediary for Pedro de Heredia in the Spanish conquest of Colombia
- India Crago Harris (1848-1948), American diplomat, lawyer, and patron of the arts
- India Edwards (1895–1990), American journalist and political advisor
- India Eisley (born 1993), American actress
- India Ennenga (born 1994), American actress
- India Fisher (born 1974), British actress, narrator and presenter
- India Fowler (born c 2000s), British actress
- India Gants, (born 1996), American model
- India Grey, British romance novelist
- India Hair (born 1987), French actress of American-English parentage
- India Rose Hemsworth (born 2012), British actress, daughter of Chris Hemsworth
- India Hicks (born 1967), British designer, writer, businesswoman, and former fashion model
- India Knight (born 1965), British journalist and author
- India Oxenberg (born 1991), American film producer
- India Summer (born 1975), American pornographic actress
- India Trotter (born 1985), American former professional soccer player
- India Walton (born 1982), former mayoral candidate in Buffalo, New York
- India Willoughby (born 1965), English journalist and newsreader

== Animals named India ==
- India "Willie" Bush, a cat owned by former U.S. President George W. Bush and First Lady Laura Bush

== Fictional characters named India ==
- India, character in Shalimar the Clown
- India the Moonstone Fairy, character in the Rainbow Magic book franchise
- India Bridge, character in the 1990 film Mr. and Mrs. Bridge
- India Cohen, minor character in Buffy the Vampire Slayer
- India Jourdain, an antagonist character in the TV series Jane by Design
- India McCray, character in 1981 horror/psychological thriller book The Elementals by Michael McDowell
- India Opal, character in the book Because of Winn-Dixie
- India Stoker, character in the 2013 film Stoker
- India Tate, character in the 1983 novel Voice of Our Shadow by Jonathan Carroll
- India Wilkes, character in the book Gone with the Wind

== India as a family name ==
People with the surname India include:

- Jaclyn Sienna India, American luxury travel advisor
- Jonathan India, American baseball player
