= Union of India =

Union of India or Indian Union may refer to:

- The country of India
- Dominion of India (1947–1950), which was also known as the Union of India
- The Government of India, which "may sue or be sued by the name" of Union of India, as per Article 300 of the Indian Constitution

== See also ==
- India (disambiguation)
- Political integration of India
- State of India (disambiguation)
