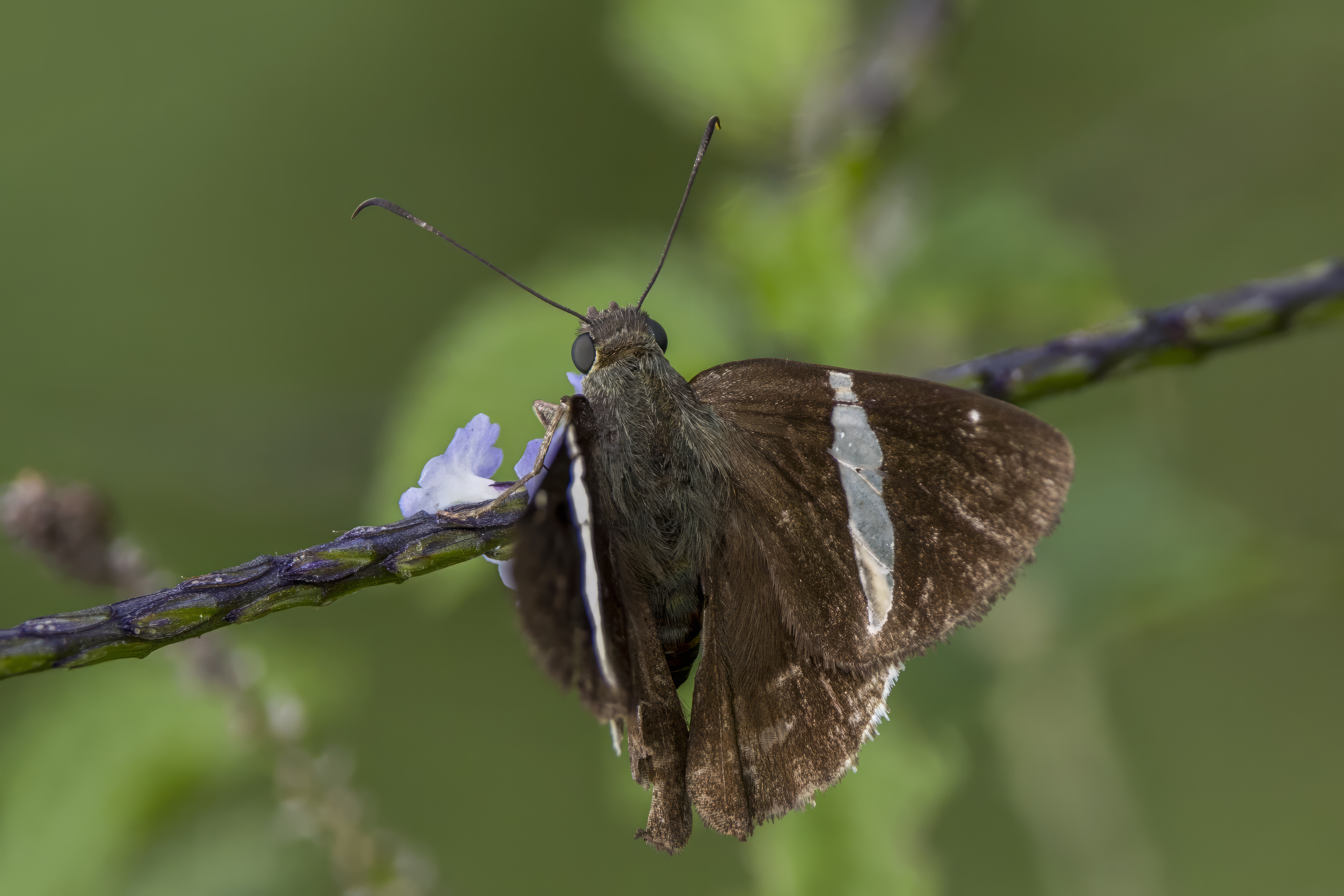
- In Colombia

Scientific classification
- Kingdom: Animalia
- Phylum: Arthropoda
- Class: Insecta
- Order: Lepidoptera
- Family: Hesperiidae
- Genus: Autochton
- Species: A. bipunctatus

Binomial name
- Autochton bipunctatus (Gmelin, 1790)

Synonyms
- Papilio bipunctatus Gmelin, [1790]; Cecropterus orontes Plötz, 1882; Cecropterus zonilis Mabille, 1883; Cecropterus bipunctatus

= Autochton bipunctatus =

Gmelin's banded skipper

Species of skipper butterfly (Hesperiidae

Autochton bipunctatus, also known by the vernacular names Gmelin's banded skipper, two-spotted banded skipper, and twin-spot banded skipper, is a butterfly species in the family Hesperiidae.

It was first described by Johann Friedrich Gmelin as Papilio bipunctatus in the Gmelin 13th edition of Systema Naturae.

A. bipunctatus occurs in the Americas, where its distribution ranges from Mexico south to Bolivia and Brazil. Its habitat consists of forest edges at an altitude of up to 1000 m above sea level.
