= Indian Raj =

Indian Raj ('kingdom', 'realm', 'state', or 'empire') may refer to:

- Company Raj, the rule of the British East India Company on the Indian subcontinent (1757–1858)
- British Raj, the rule of the British Crown on the Indian subcontinent (1858–1947)

== See also ==
- Indian (disambiguation)
- Raj (disambiguation)
