= Indien =

Indien may refer to

- Indien (film), 1993 Austrian tragicomic road movie by Paul Harather
- French ship Indien (1768), ship of the line of the French Navy, took part in the American War of Independence
- Indien (1778), frigate built for the U.S. Commissioners in France
- German for India

== See also ==
- Indian (disambiguation)
