= Aboriginal English =

Aboriginal English may refer to:

- Australian Aboriginal English
- Aboriginal English in Canada
