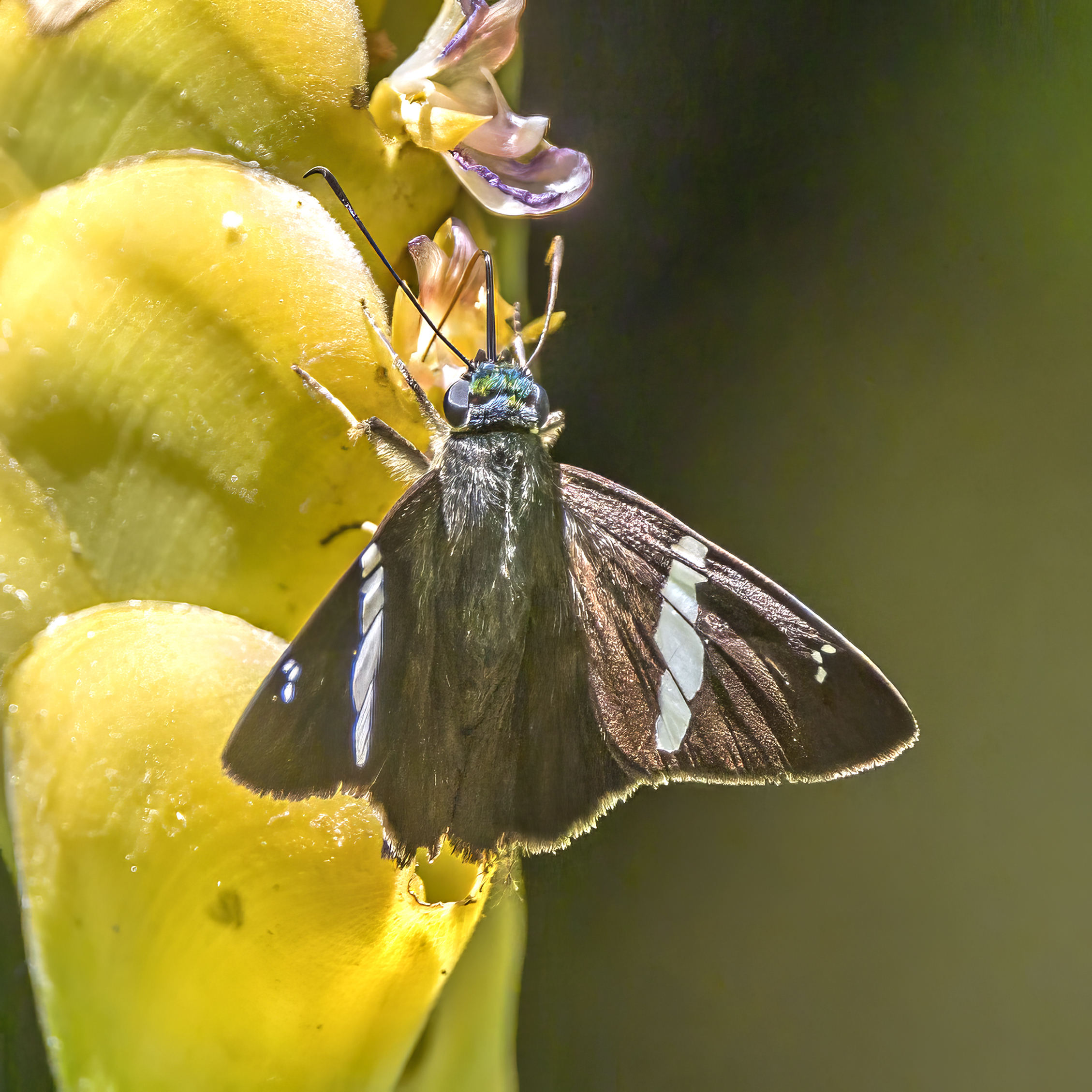
- Common banded skipper A. neis, Colombia

Scientific classification
- Kingdom: Animalia
- Phylum: Arthropoda
- Class: Insecta
- Order: Lepidoptera
- Family: Hesperiidae
- Subfamily: Eudaminae
- Genus: Autochton; Hübner, [1823]

Species
- See text

Synonyms
- List: Cecropterus (Hübner, 1818); Autochthon (Herrich-Schäffer, 1869); Ccropterus (W. F. Kirby, 1871); Rhabdoides (Scudder, 1889); Antochton (W. F. Kirby, 1912); Oecropterus (Spitz, 1932); Acropterus (Kaye, 1940); Rhaboides (Hayward, 1947); Authochton (Ramos, 1977); Cabares Godman & Salvin, 1894

= Autochton (butterfly) =

Genus of butterflies

Autochton is a genus of skipper butterflies. They belong to the subfamily Eudaminae, which was long included with the spread-winged skippers (Pyrginae) as a tribe. They are found from Mexico to South America.

== Species ==
The following species are recognised in the genus Autochton:

- Autochton bipunctatus (Gmelin, [1790]) – two-spotted banded-skipper or twin-spot banded skipper
- Autochton integrifascia (Mabille, 1891)
- Autochton itylus Hübner, [1823]
- Autochton neis (Geyer, 1832)
- Autochton oryx (C. Felder & R. Felder, 1862)
- Autochton potrillo (Lucas, 1857)
- Autochton reflexus (Mabille & Boullet, 1912)
- Autochton sulfureolus (Mabille, 1883)
