= Lists of First Nations =

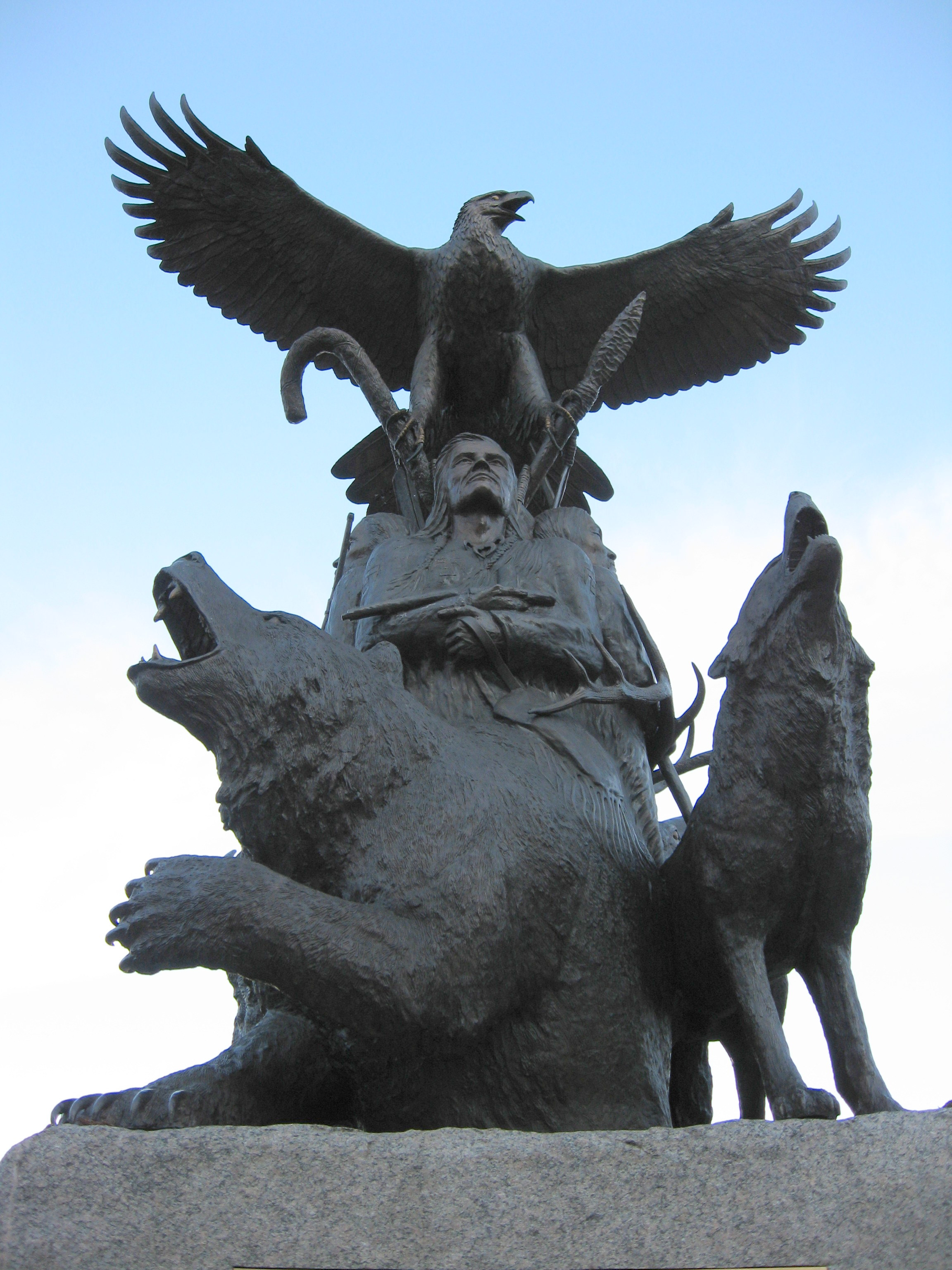

Lists of First Nations cover the First Nations of Canada, the predominant indigenous peoples in Canada south of the Arctic Circle. The lists include:

- List of First Nations band governments, a list, by province or territory, of the various First Nations government bodies in Canada
- List of First Nations peoples, a list, by geographical area, of the various First Nations tribes in Canada
- List of First Nations people, an alphabetical list of people who are members of the First Nations in Canada
