= Autochthon =

Autochthon, autochthons or autochthonous may refer to:

== Nature ==
- Autochthon (geology), a sediment or rock that can be found at its site of formation or deposition
- Autochthon (nature), an indigenous animal or plant
- Autochthonous transmission, the spread of disease between two individuals in the same place

== Society ==
- Autochthon (ancient Greece), a concept or mythology of a people born from the land
- Autochthonous language, the language of an indigenous people
- Autochthonism or indigenism, ethnic nationalism promoting the identity of an indigenous people
- Autochthones or indigenous peoples, peoples with a set of specific rights based on their historical ties to a particular territory

== Fiction ==
- Autochthon (Atlantis), a character in Plato's myth of Atlantis
- Autochthons, characters in the novel The Divine Invasion by Philip K. Dick
- Autochthon, a Primordial in the Exalted role-playing game
- Autochthons, powerful angelic beings in the novel Fall; or, Dodge in Hell

== See also ==
- Aboriginal (disambiguation)
- Autochthonous Croatian Party of Rights, a far right political party
- Autochton (butterfly), a genus of butterflies
- Autochtoon, Dutch people in the Netherlands
- Chthon (disambiguation)
- Constitutional autochthony, an assertion of political autonomy
- Symphony No. 4 (Still), also known as Symphony No. 4 "Autochthonous", a 1947 composition by American composer William Grant Still.
