= American Indians =

American Indians or American Indian may refer to:

== Indigenous groups of the Americas ==
- Indigenous peoples of the Americas
- Native Americans in the United States
- American Indian and Alaska Native, a U.S. Census category including American Indians
- First Nations in Canada, indigenous peoples of Canada
- "Indian" and "American Indian", about the term and its etymology

== Other uses ==
- Americans in India, U.S. citizens living in India, or an Indian citizen of American descent
- Indian Americans, U.S. citizens with ancestry from India
- American Indian (magazine), a publication of the National Museum of the American Indian

== See also ==
- Indian (disambiguation)
- Native Americans (disambiguation)
