= India: The Rise of an Asian Giant =

- Author: Dietmar Rothermund
- Subject: Economy of India
- Publisher: Yale University Press
- Publication date: 2008
- Publication place: United States
- Pages: 274
- ISBN: 978-0-300-11309-9
- LC Class: HC435.3.R68 2008

India: The Rise of an Asian Giant is a 2008 book by Dietmar Rothermund which describes the contemporary state of the major influences on the economy of India.

== Chapter synopsis ==
The chapters of this book are named to be descriptive of the contents and are as follows:

- Building a Democratic Nation
- Emergence of National Coalitions
- Tensions of Federalism
- Role in World Affairs
- Argument of Power: Atom Bombs and Rockets
- Liberalizing a Hidebound Economy
- Sick Mills and Strong Powerlooms
- Diamonds, Garments, and Software
- Quest for Supercomputers
- Agriculture: Crisis or Promise
- Giant's Shackles: Water, Energy, and Infrastructure
- Caste in a Changing Society
- Boon of Demographic Dividend
- Demand for Education
- New Middle Class: Consumers and Savers
- Persistence of Poverty
- Splendour of the Media
- Dynamic Diaspora

== Reviews ==
The review in The Spectator noted that this book is "a meticulous historian's collection of facts, backed by a lifetime's work."

A reviewer for the British Scholar Society said that the "chapters that make up this book are more extended vignettes than comprehensive surveys, offering a short narrative built around a handful of examples and statistics."

Another reviewer said that while the book purports to be an introductory text, it may in fact be too advanced for a beginner, but still - "..no other 'introduction' to India covers more ground than Rothermund's book."
