= Jaclyn Sienna India =

American travel adviser

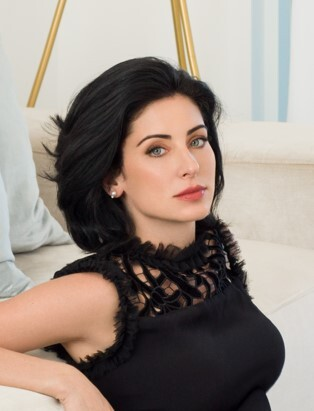
- Born: Jaclyn Sienna India
- Occupations: Entrepreneur; travel adviser
- Known for: Founder and CEO of Sienna Charles
- Spouse: Freddy Charles Reinert

Jaclyn Sienna India is an American entrepreneur and travel adviser. She is the founder and CEO of Sienna Charles, a lifestyle and travel concierge agency.

== Career ==
India began her career at Le Bec-Fin, a French restaurant in Philadelphia. After moving to Florida, she worked at a traditional travel agency. In 2008, she founded Sienna Charles with her husband, Freddy Charles Reinert.

In 2012, Sienna Charles planned its first trip for a world leader, as reported by CNN. In 2015, she organized a trip to Ethiopia's Omo Valley for former President George W. Bush. Since 2012, her agency has organized over 100 trips for at least 15 presidents, prime ministers, public figures and also celebrities, such as Mariah Carey. In a 2024 interview with ET Online, India stated that her firm has seen an increase in younger clients from the tech and media industries seeking private travel arrangements, including access to well-known landmarks and events.

== Controversy ==
In September 2024, during an appearance on Tosh Show, she stated that her first billionaire client contacted her after reading an article about her work. She claimed that the client requested assistance in bringing a private yacht into the Galápagos Islands, where such yachts are prohibited, and said that she "made it happen anyway."
