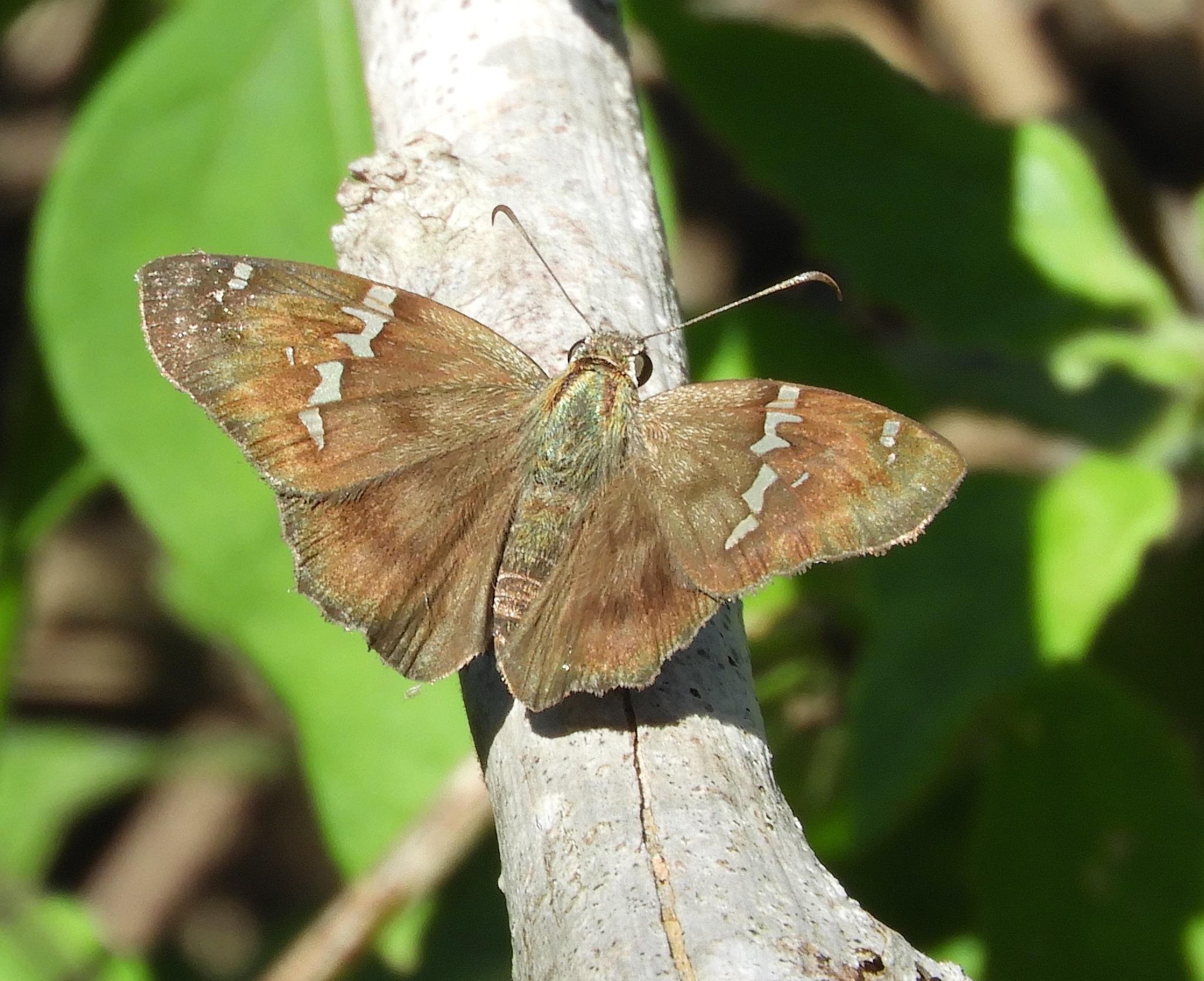

Scientific classification
- Kingdom: Animalia
- Phylum: Arthropoda
- Class: Insecta
- Order: Lepidoptera
- Family: Hesperiidae
- Genus: Autochton
- Species: A. potrillo

Binomial name
- Autochton potrillo (Lucas, 1857)

Synonyms
- Thanaos potrillo Lucas, 1857; Cabares potrillo (Lucas, 1857); Eudamus potrillo (Lucas, 1857)

= Autochton potrillo =

Species of butterfly

Autochton potrillo, the potrillo skipper, is a species of dicot skipper in the butterfly family Hesperiidae. It is found in the Caribbean Sea, Central America, North America, and South America.

== Subspecies ==
Two subspecies are recognised:

- Autochton potrillo potrillo (Lucas, 1857)
- Autochton potrillo reducta Mabille & Boullet, 1919
