= South Asia Institute, Heidelberg University =

Research center at Heidelberg University, Germany

Coordinates: 49°25′06″N 8°40′11″E

- ('Südasien-Institut' in German)
- Abbreviation: SAI
- Formation: 1962 (64 years ago)
- Type: University-affiliated institute
- Purpose: Humanities and social-science research and teaching on South Asia
- Parent organization: Ruprecht-Karls-Universität Heidelberg
- Website: www.sai.uni-heidelberg.de/en

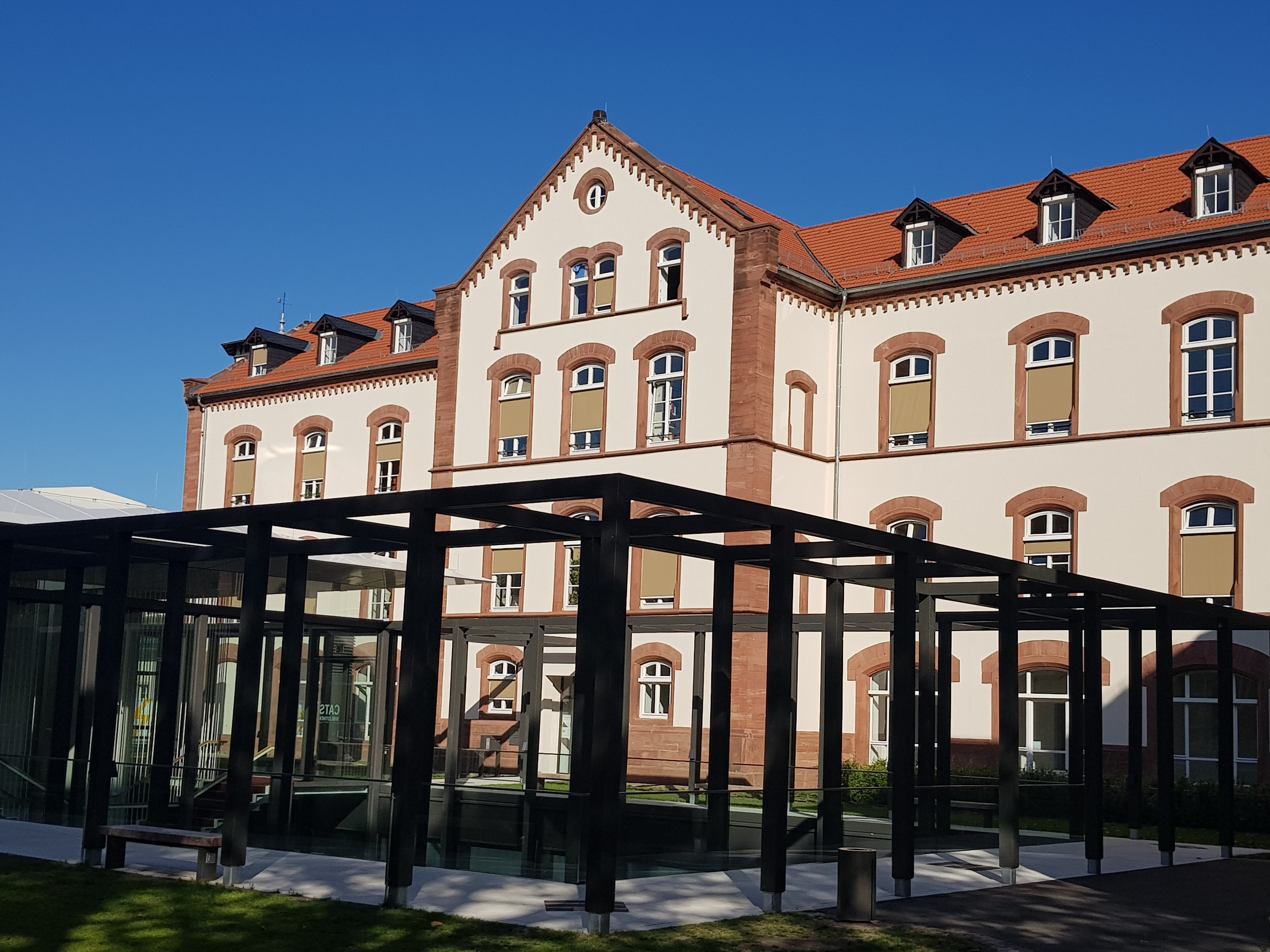
The building housing the South Asia Institute since 2019, with the CATS library in the foreground.

The South Asia Institute (SAI) is an interdisciplinary center of the Ruprecht-Karls University Heidelberg in Heidelberg, Germany, for research and teaching on South Asia. In German, it is known as the Südasien-Institut. The regional focus of the research and teaching at SAI are the countries Bangladesh, Bhutan, India, Maldives, Nepal, Pakistan and Sri Lanka. Due to their close linguistic, cultural, and historical ties with the South Asian subcontinent, adjacent regions such as Afghanistan and Tibet are also often included in the work done at the South Asia Institute.

== Brief history and location ==
SAI was founded at the Heidelberg University in 1962 by Werner Conze and Wilhelm Hahn. It was then located at the campus in Neuenheimer Feld, where it continued to be based for over half a century.

In April 2019, SAI was shifted to the campus in the Bergheim locality of Heidelberg. There, this institute now forms one of the four constituent institutes of Heidelberg University's Centre for Asian and Transcultural Studies (CATS) - the others being the Centre for East Asian Studies, the Department of Ethnology, and the Heidelberg Centre for Transcultural Studies. The library and collections of the former SAI were merged with those of the three other constituent institutes of CATS to form the CATS library. The four constitutive institutes of CATS are situated next to each other, with the CATS library in their middle.

Like the other buildings of CATS, the current building housing SAI was built between 1869 and 1876. From then until 1945, these buildings served as a part of the Neues Akademisches Krankenhaus (New Academic Hospital) in Heidelberg. Thereafter, this hospital was gradually shifted to Neuenheimer Feld. In 2012, the dermatological clinic, which was based in the building that would later house SAI, was shifted to Neuenheimer Feld. The location of CATS is right next to the Bismarkplatz, one of the main commercial and transport hubs of Heidelberg.

SAI has branch offices in New Delhi (India), Islamabad (Pakistan), Kathmandu (Nepal), and Colombo (Sri Lanka).

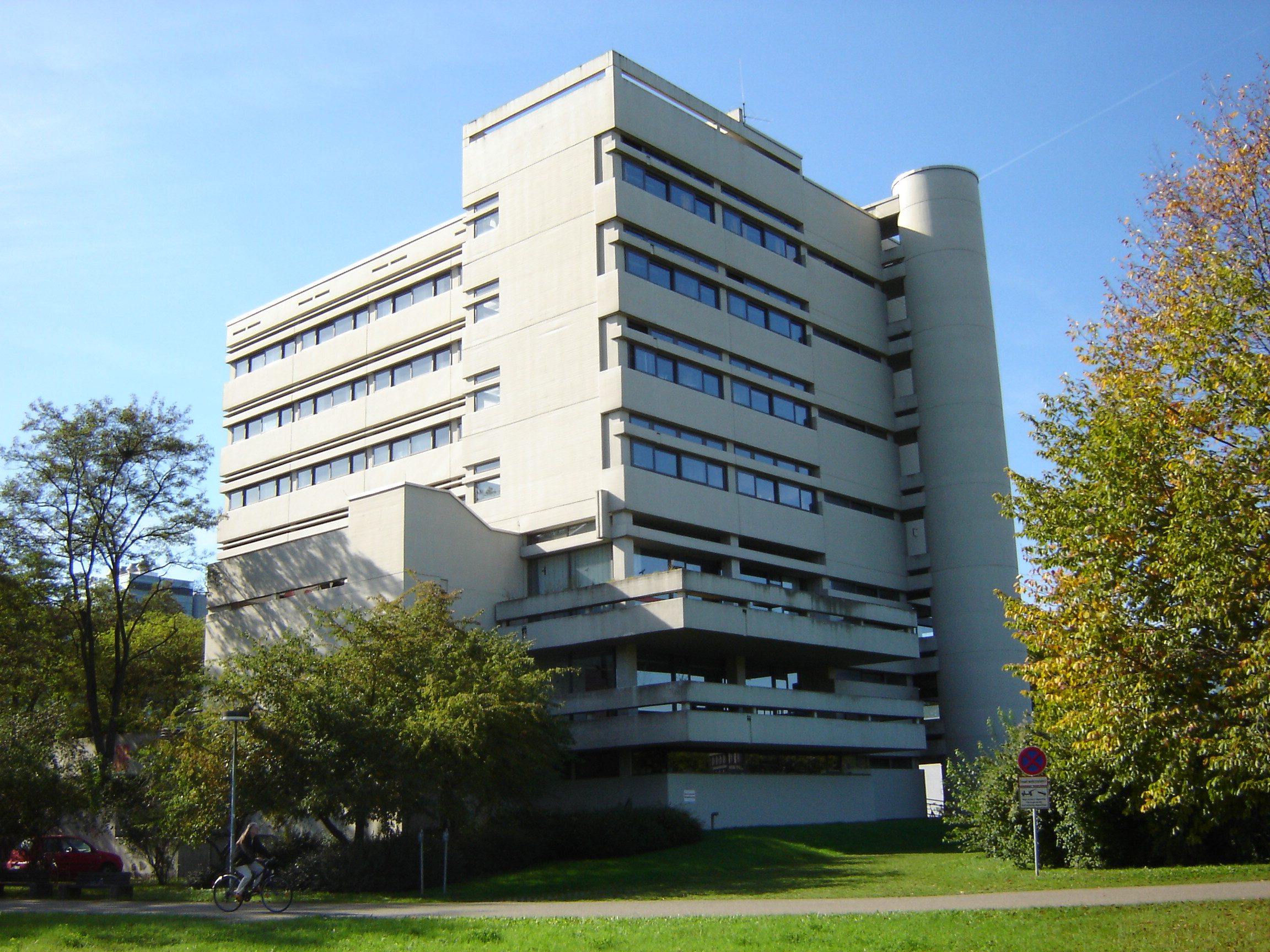
The building in Neuenheimer Feld that housed the South Asia Institute from 1962 till 2019.

== Faculties and courses offered ==
Currently, SAI has seven departments, each headed by a professor: Development Economics, Anthropology, Geography, History of South Asia, Cultural and Religious History of South Asia (Classical Indology), Modern South Asian Languages and Literatures (Modern Indology), and Political Science. Each department of SAI conducts research, at the professorial, postdoctoral, doctoral, and masters levels.

While scholars and research projects affiliated with SAI have worked in various parts of South Asian countries, the institute has had particularly long traditions of research in certain parts of South Asia. These include Bangladesh and Bengal, the Hindu-Kush-Himalaya region, Delhi, Odisha, Punjab in Pakistan, south India and Sri Lanka, and Varanasi.

SAI offers the following degrees fully devoted to South Asia:

- M.A. in Development, Environment, Societies, and History in South Asia (MADESH)
- M.A. in Cultural and Religious History of South Asia (KRS)
- M.A. in Communication, Literature, and Media in Modern South Asian Languages (KLM)
- B.A. in South Asian Studies

SAI also offers language courses in Bengali, Hindi, Urdu, and Tamil.

== See also ==
- Südasien-Institut (SAI on German Wikipedia)
- Centrum für Asienwissenschaften und Transkulturelle Studien (CATS on German Wikipedia)
