= Indian =

Indian or Indians may refer to:

== People or things associated with India ==
- Indian people
- Indian diaspora
- Languages of India
- Indian English, a dialect of the English language
- Indian cuisine
- Ethnic groups in South Asia

== Indigenous peoples of the Americas ==
- Indigenous peoples of the Americas (see Native American name controversy § Indian and American Indian (since 1492))
- First Nations in Canada
- Native Americans in the United States
- Indigenous peoples of the Caribbean
- Indigenous languages of the Americas
- Classification of the Indigenous peoples of the Americas

== Arts and entertainment ==
=== Film ===
- Cinema of India
- Indian (film series), an Indian Tamil-language film series by S. Shankar
  - Indian (1996 film), first part of the series
- Indian (2001 film), an Indian Hindi-language film by N. Maharajan
- The Indian (film), a 2009 Dutch comedy

=== Music ===
- Indians (musician), Danish singer Søren Løkke Juul
- "The Indian", an unreleased instrumental by Basshunter from 2016
- "Indian" (song), a single by Sturm und Drang, from album Learning to Rock, 2007
- "Indians" (song), a single by Anthrax, from album Among the Living, 1987
- "Indians", a song by Gojira from 2003 album The Link

=== Other uses in arts and entertainment ===
- Indian poker or Indian head, AKA blind man's bluff, a card game
- Indians (play), by Arthur Kopit, 1968
- Indians (sculpture), or The Bowman and The Spearman, by Ivan Meštrović, 1928
- Indian television drama

== Places ==
- Indian, West Virginia, U.S.
- The Indians, an archipelago of islets in the British Virgin Islands

== Sports teams/clubs ==
=== Baseball ===
- Cleveland Indians (now the Cleveland Guardians), Ohio, US
- Indianapolis Indians, Indiana, US
- Indios de Mayagüez, Puerto Rico

=== Cricket ===
- Mumbai Indians, Indian Premier League
- Mumbai Indians (WPL), Women's Premier League

=== Ice hockey ===
- Frölunda Indians (now Frölunda HC), Gothenburg, Sweden
- Hannover Indians, Lower Saxony, Germany
- Springfield Indians (1926–1994), Massachusetts, US

=== Other sports ===
- Akwesasne Indians, a Mohawk Nation team in the Ontario Lacrosse Association
- Calcutta Indians, India's national association football (soccer) team in 1924

== Transportation ==
- Indian Airlines, a now-defunct state-owned airline of India
- Indian Motorcycle, an American brand of motorcycles

== See also ==
- Indien (disambiguation)
- Indian languages (disambiguation)
- Indian Raj (disambiguation)
- American Indians (disambiguation)
- Indianism (disambiguation)
- Indiana (disambiguation)
- India (disambiguation)
- Other related words:
  - Indicum (disambiguation)
  - Indicus (disambiguation)
  - Indo (disambiguation)
  - Indio (disambiguation)
  - Indus (disambiguation)
  - Indies (disambiguation)
- Hindustani (disambiguation)
